= Domus Eirene =

Ancient building in Plovdiv, Bulgaria

Eirene House
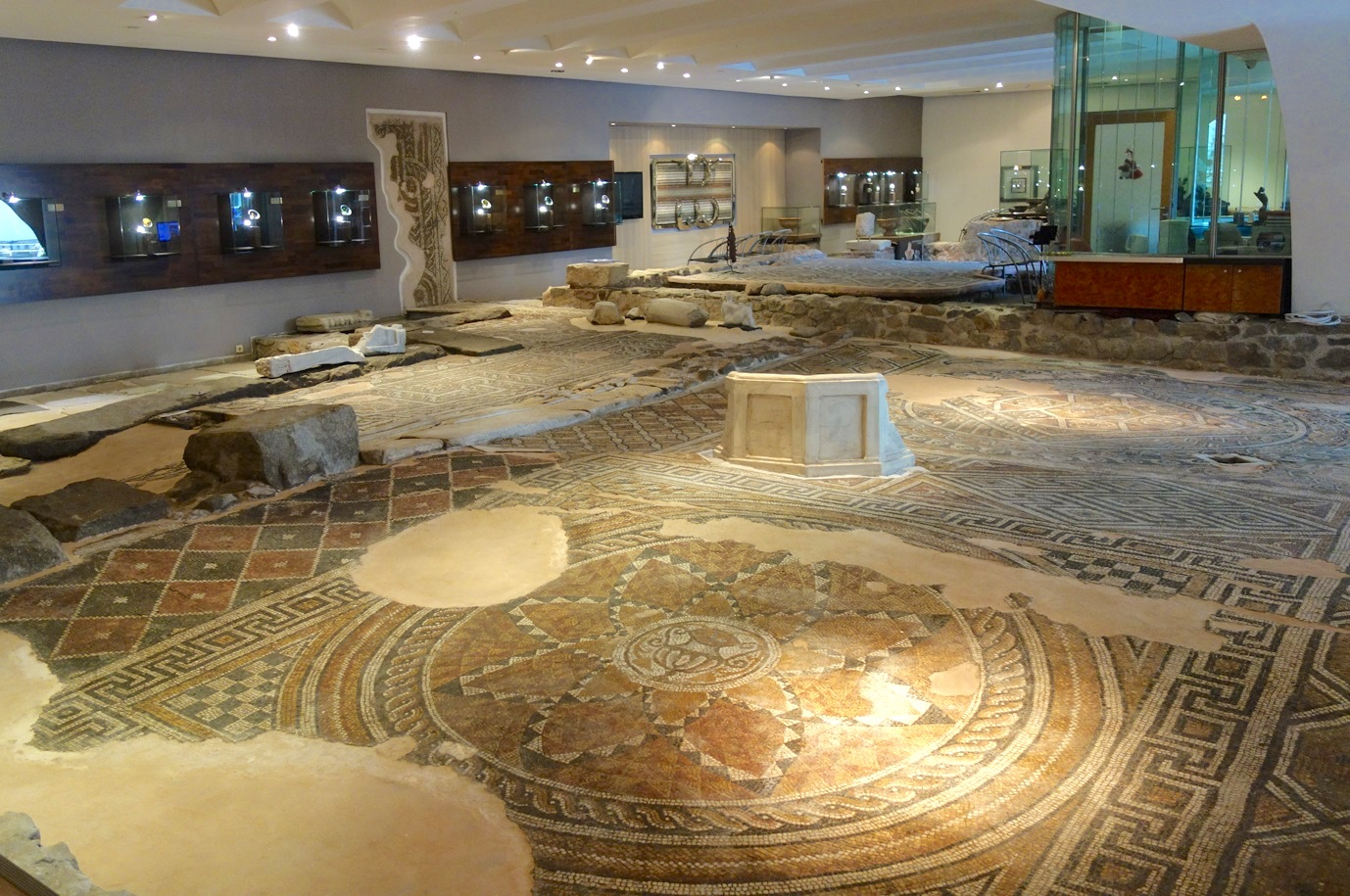

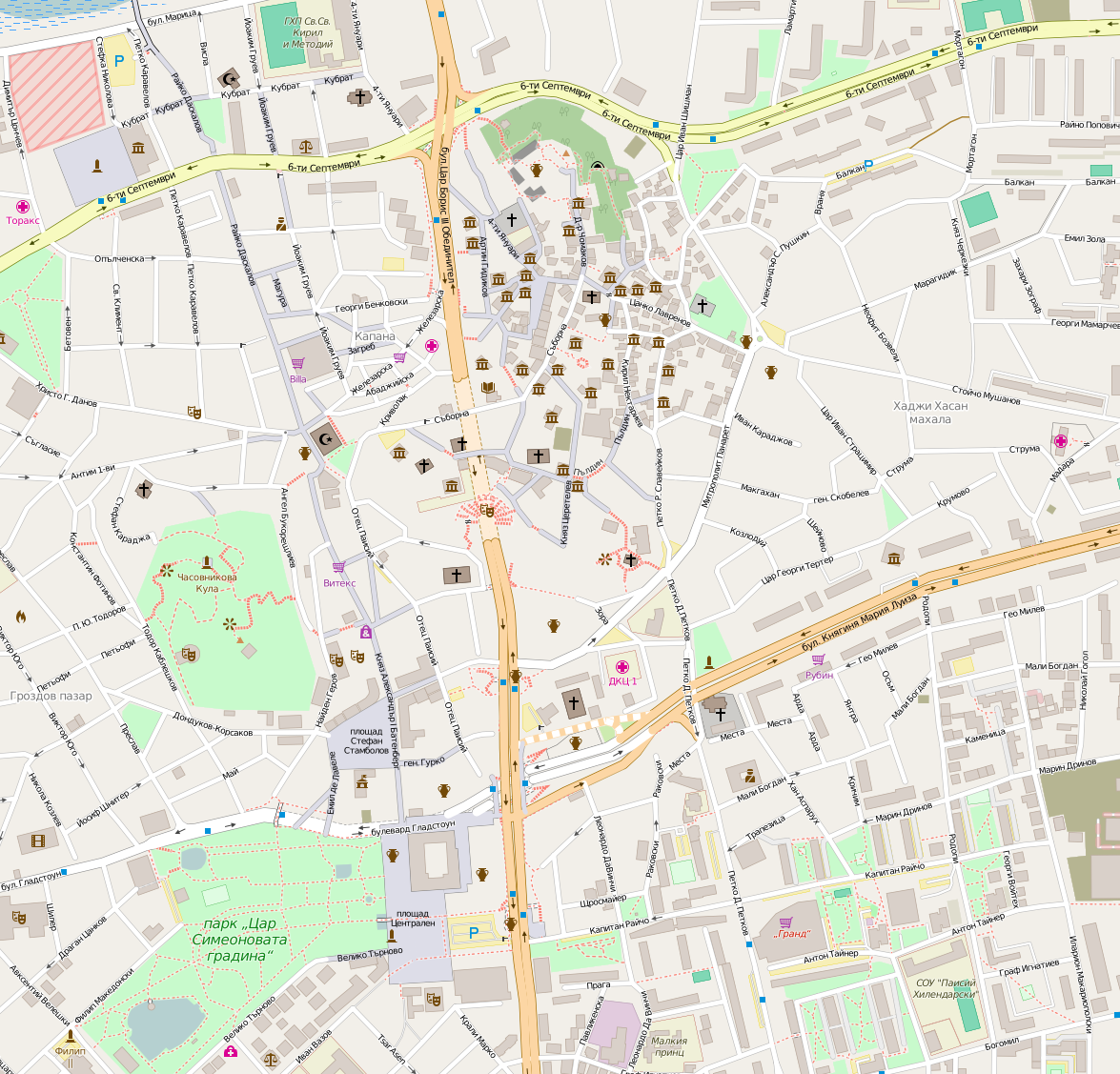
- Location within Plovdiv City Center
- 42.145140°N 24.751662°E
- Type: Residence
- Periods: Roman Empire
- Location: Plovdiv, Bulgaria

History
- Built: The middle of the 3rd century AD
- Abandoned: The end of the 6th century AD

Site notes
- Material: bricks, stone, marble
- Excavation dates: 1983-84
- Condition: Restored
- Owner: TrakArt
- Public access: Yes
- Website: trakart.org

The House of Eirene (Latin: Domus Eirene; Bulgarian: Резиденция Ейрене) is an ancient Roman peristyle house (a domus) with lavish mosaic floors in Philippopolis (modern Plovdiv), built in the middle of the 3rd century AD in the provincial capital of Thracia. It is named after the image of the Greek goddess Eirene (lit. "Peace"), depicted in the central mosaic.

It was probably built following the destructive Siege of Philippoupolis by the Goths in 250, during the Crisis of the Third Century in the Roman Empire. The excavated area of the residential complex is 668 m^{2}, of which 160 m^{2} are colourful mosaics. The remains of the residence are located in the archaeological underpass of Tsar Boris III Boulevard, in which the paved Roman street is also situated.

== The residence and the mosaics ==
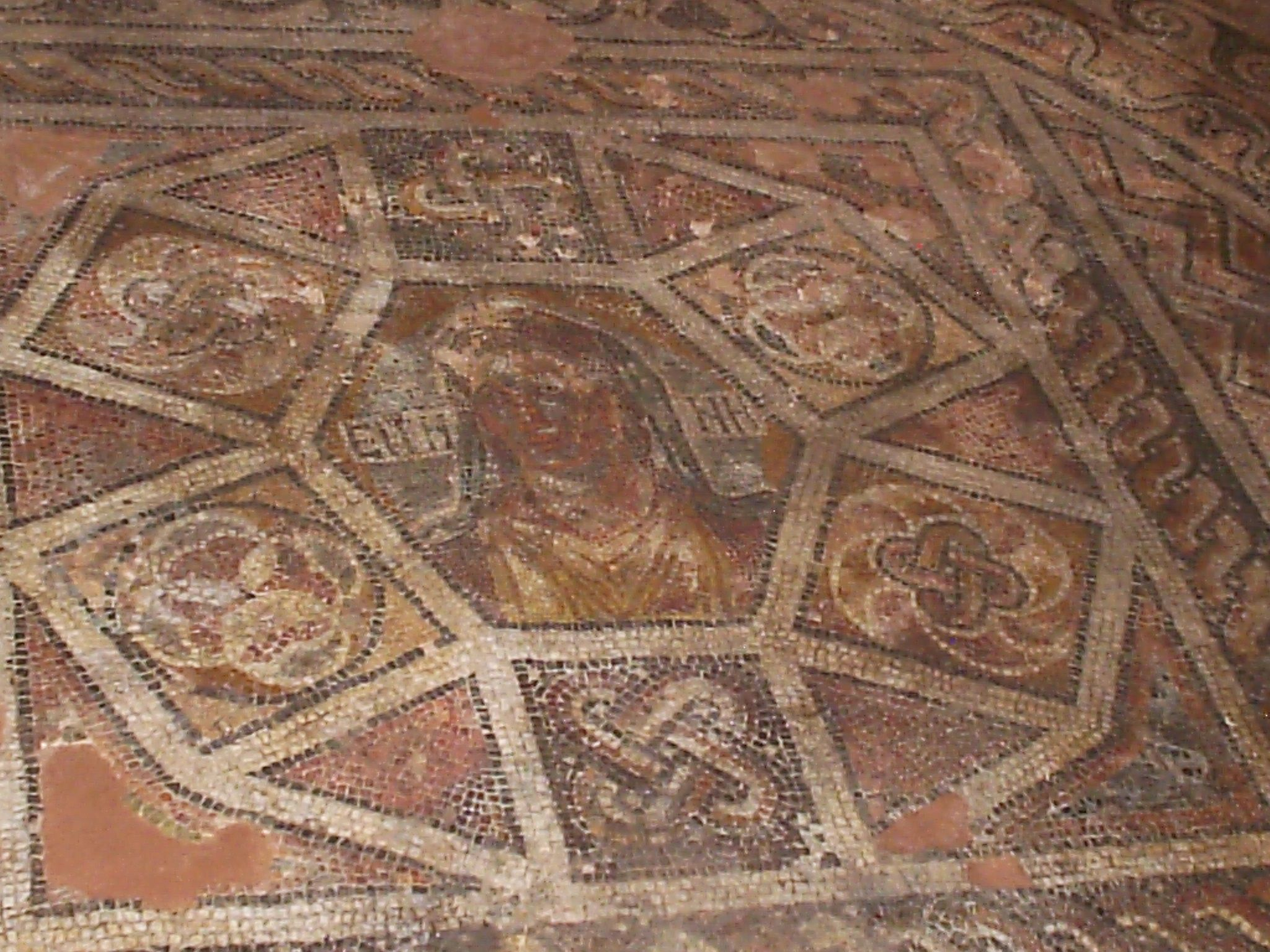
The portrait of the goddess Eirene with the inscription of her name in Greek «EIPHNH»

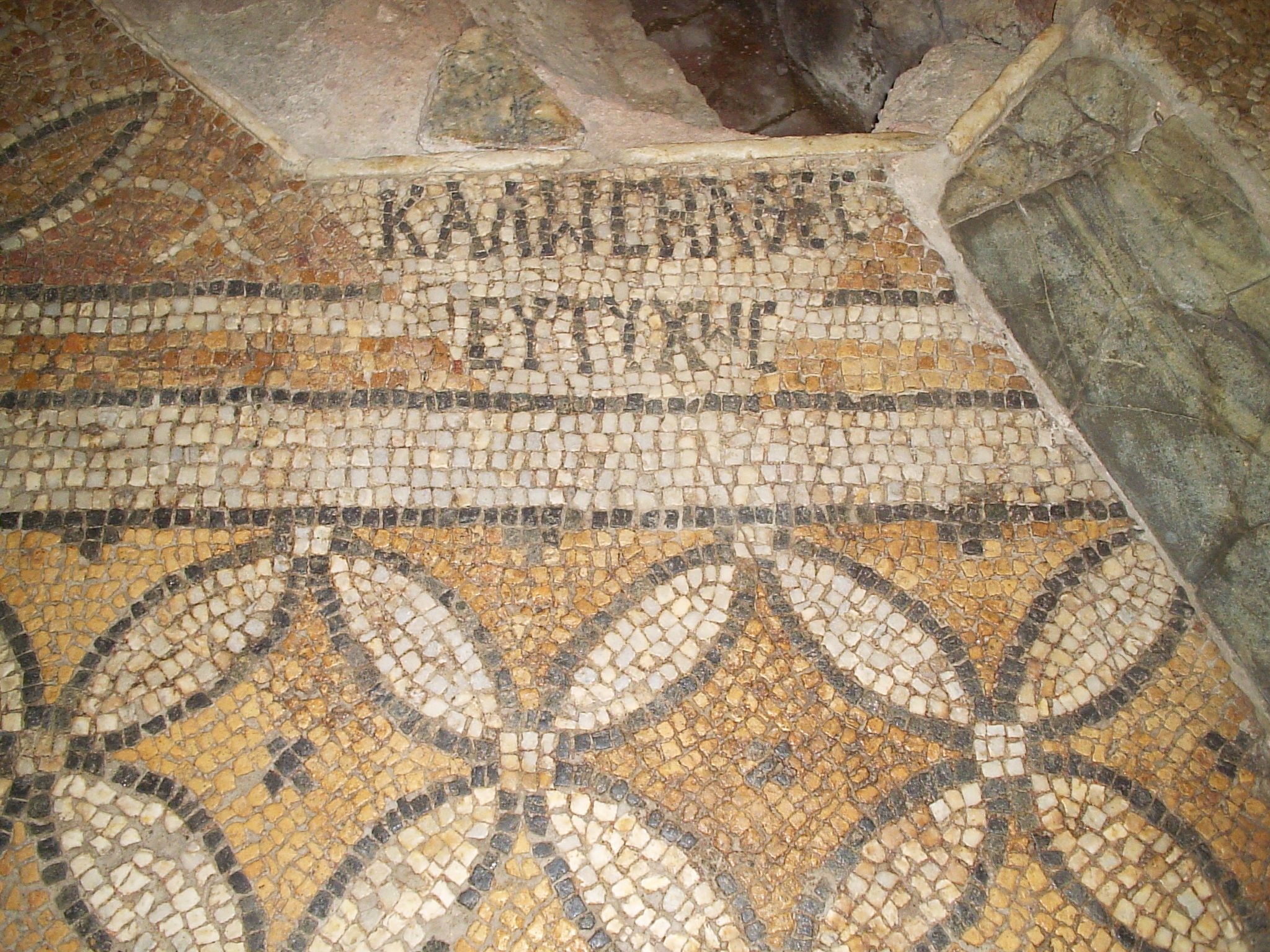
Mosaic inscription in Greek «ΚΑΛωC ΗΛΘΕC ΕΥΤΥΧωC», i.e. "Welcome fortunately"

The peristyle house was probably built in the middle of the 3rd century AD after the destruction brought to Philippopolis by the invasion of the Goths in 251 AD. The building occupies a whole insula (a city block surrounded by four streets) and was built over the ruins of several older houses which were destroyed during the Goth invasion. The house was severely damaged after the invasion of Attila's Huns in 441–442, but later it was repaired and expanded. Between the 4th and the 5th century, the floors were decorated with colourful and lavish mosaics of geometrical figures, endless knot symbols, flowers and welcoming inscriptions to visitors. The house was abandoned at the end of the 6th century, like other important buildings in the area, such as the episcopal basilica of Philippopolis.

The residential rooms were in the eastern part and surrounded the peristyle (an open courtyard within the house surrounded by columns) while the service rooms were located in the southern part. A separate part of the building which had a direct access to the street nearby accommodated the servants. The most beautiful mosaic was placed in the centre of the main residential room; a masterfully crafted portrait of the Greek goddess Eirene in opus vermiculatum with smaller tesserae.

The octagonal marble basin located in the centre of the floor served as a fountain.

In a later period, an apse was built next to the main entrance space.

== Excavation and restoration ==
The house and the ancient street next to it were discovered in 1983–1984 during the construction of the underpass of Tsar Boris III Boulevard in Plovdiv. Shortly afterwards the building was listed as a cultural value of national significance. The remains of the house and the mosaic floors were restored and opened to public in 2003 as a part of TrakArt cultural complex.

== Gallery ==
Further pictures of the villa mosaics as follows.

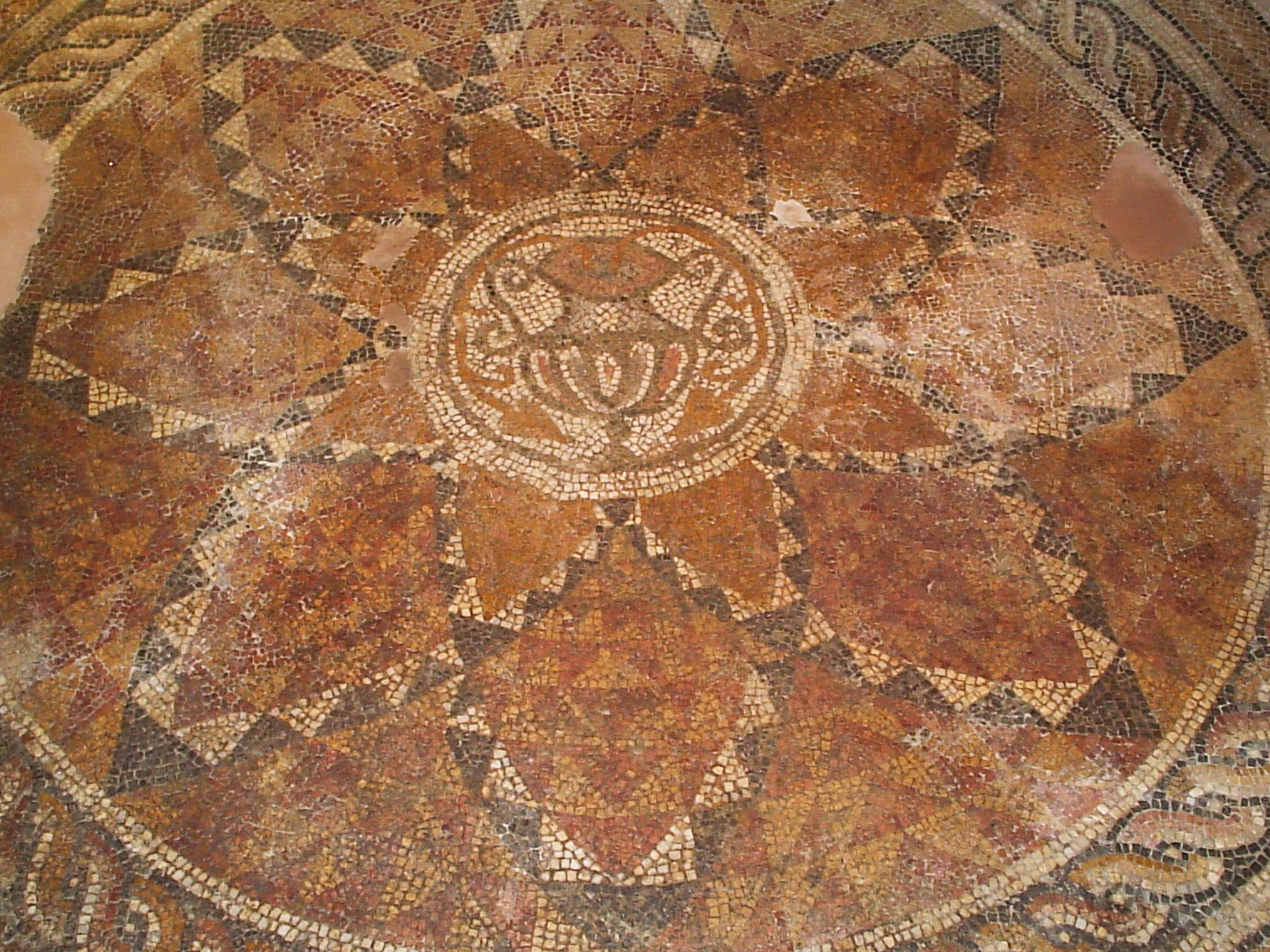

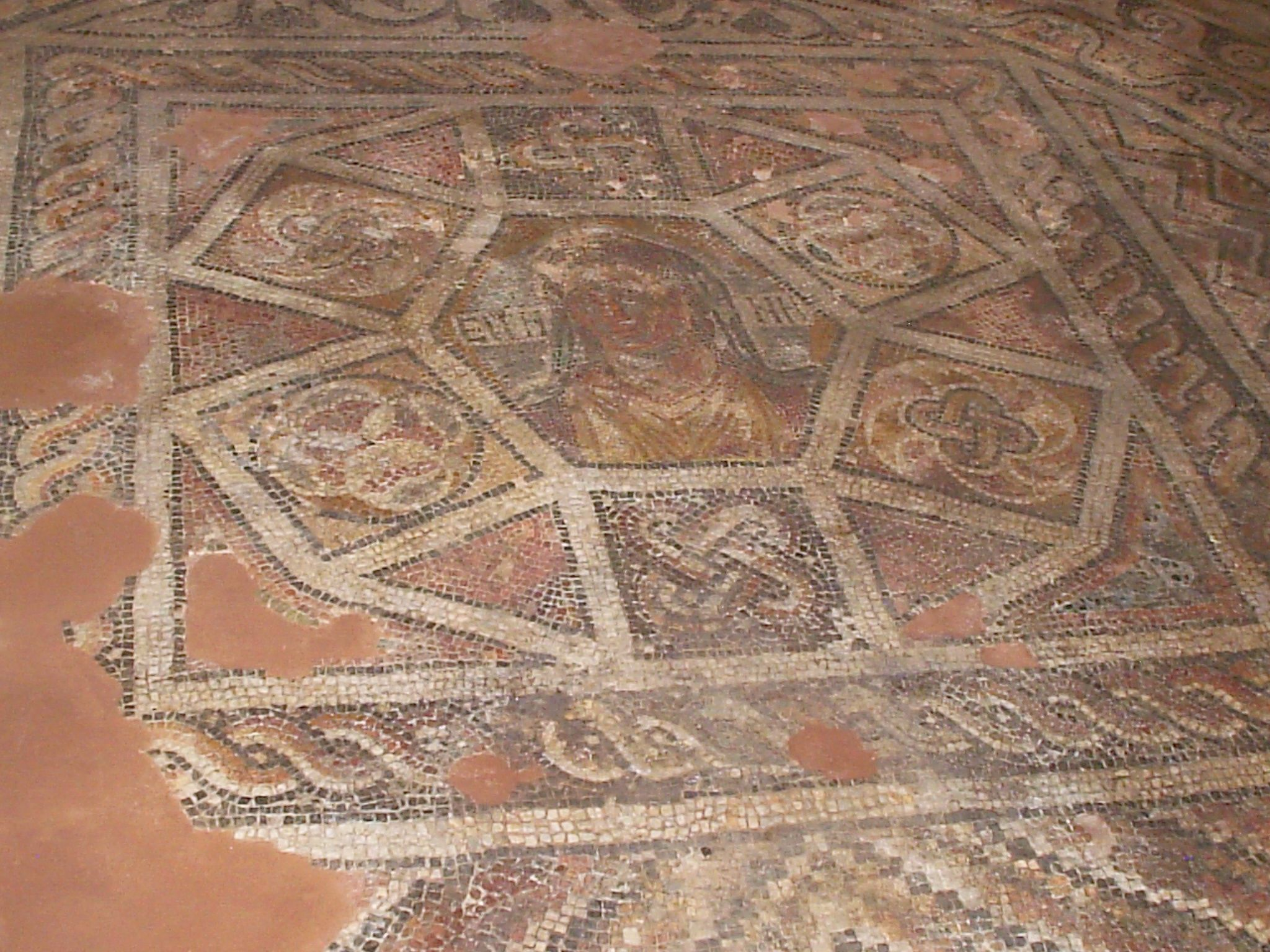

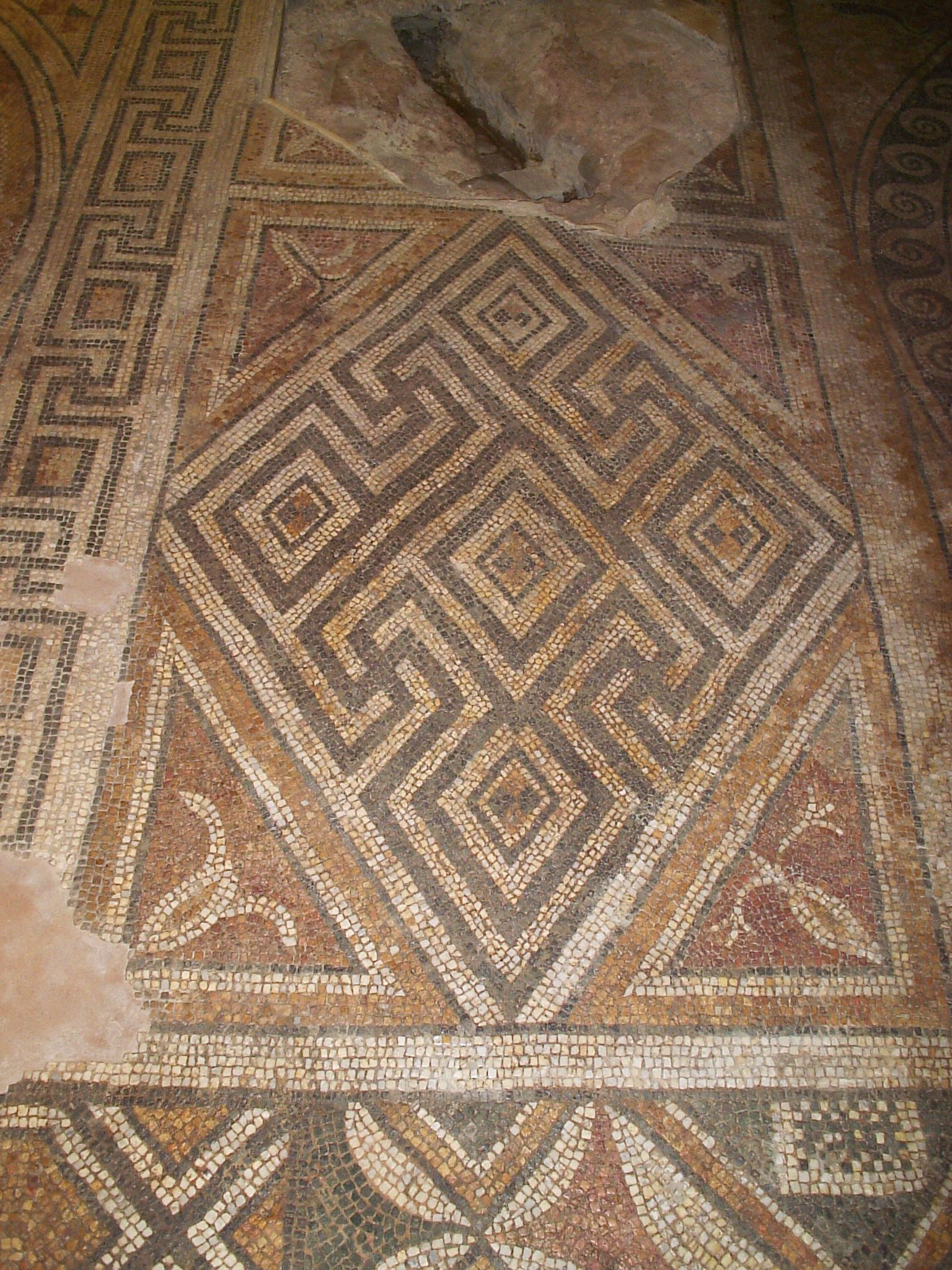

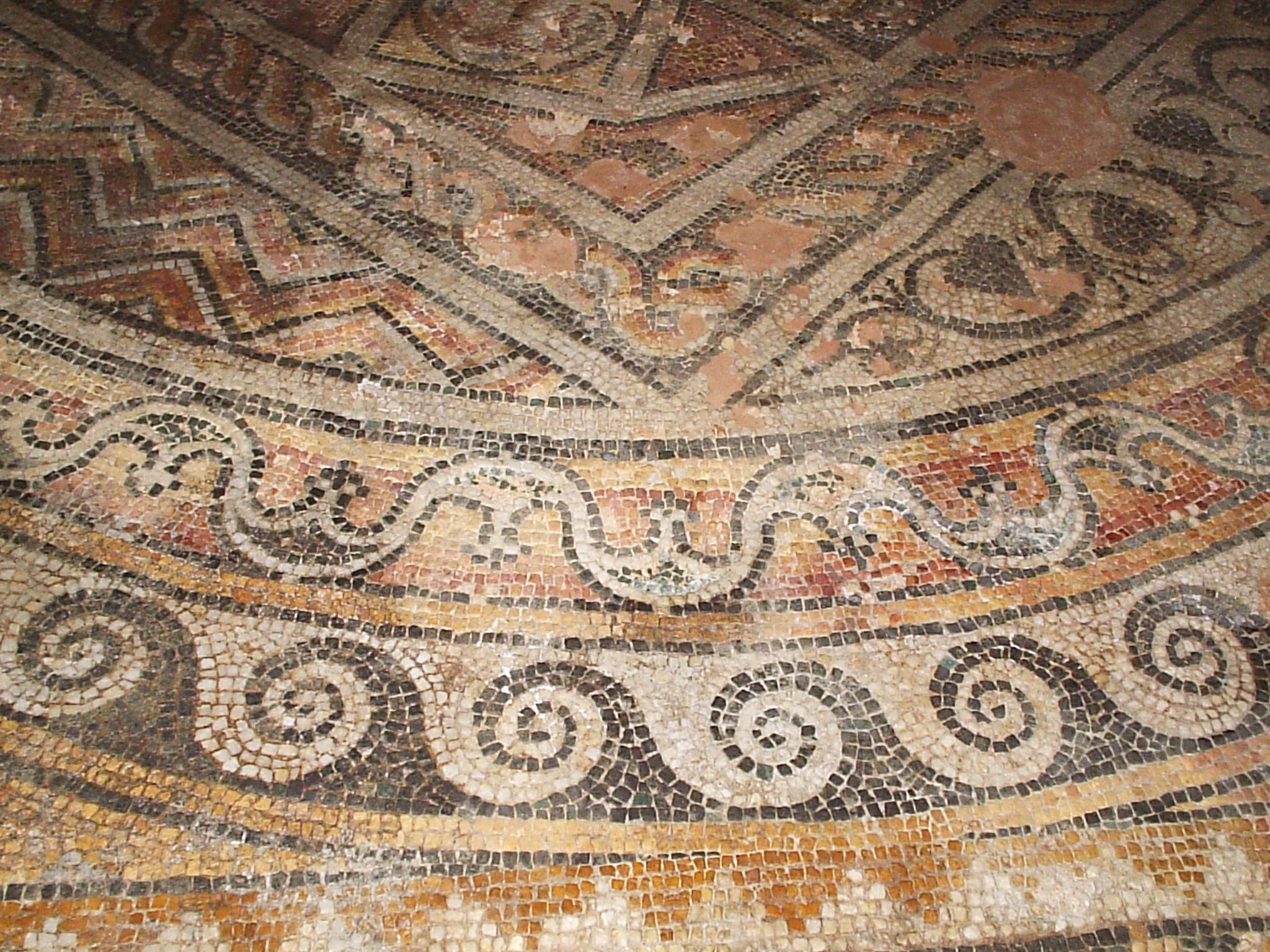

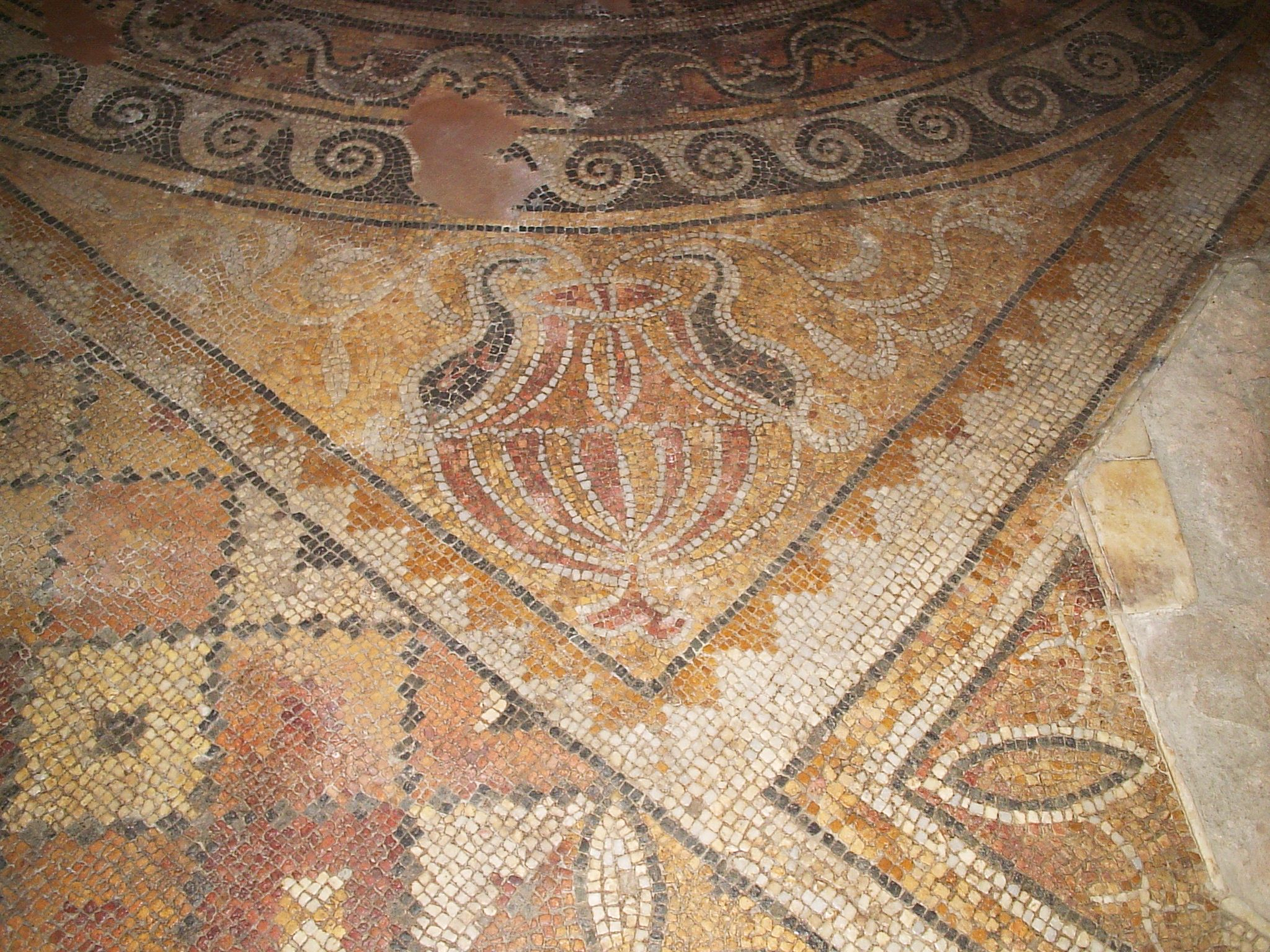
