= Great Basilica, Plovdiv =

Early Christian temple, located in Plovdiv, Bulgaria

Bishop's Basilica of Philippopolis
- Епископска базилика на Филипопол (Bulgarian)
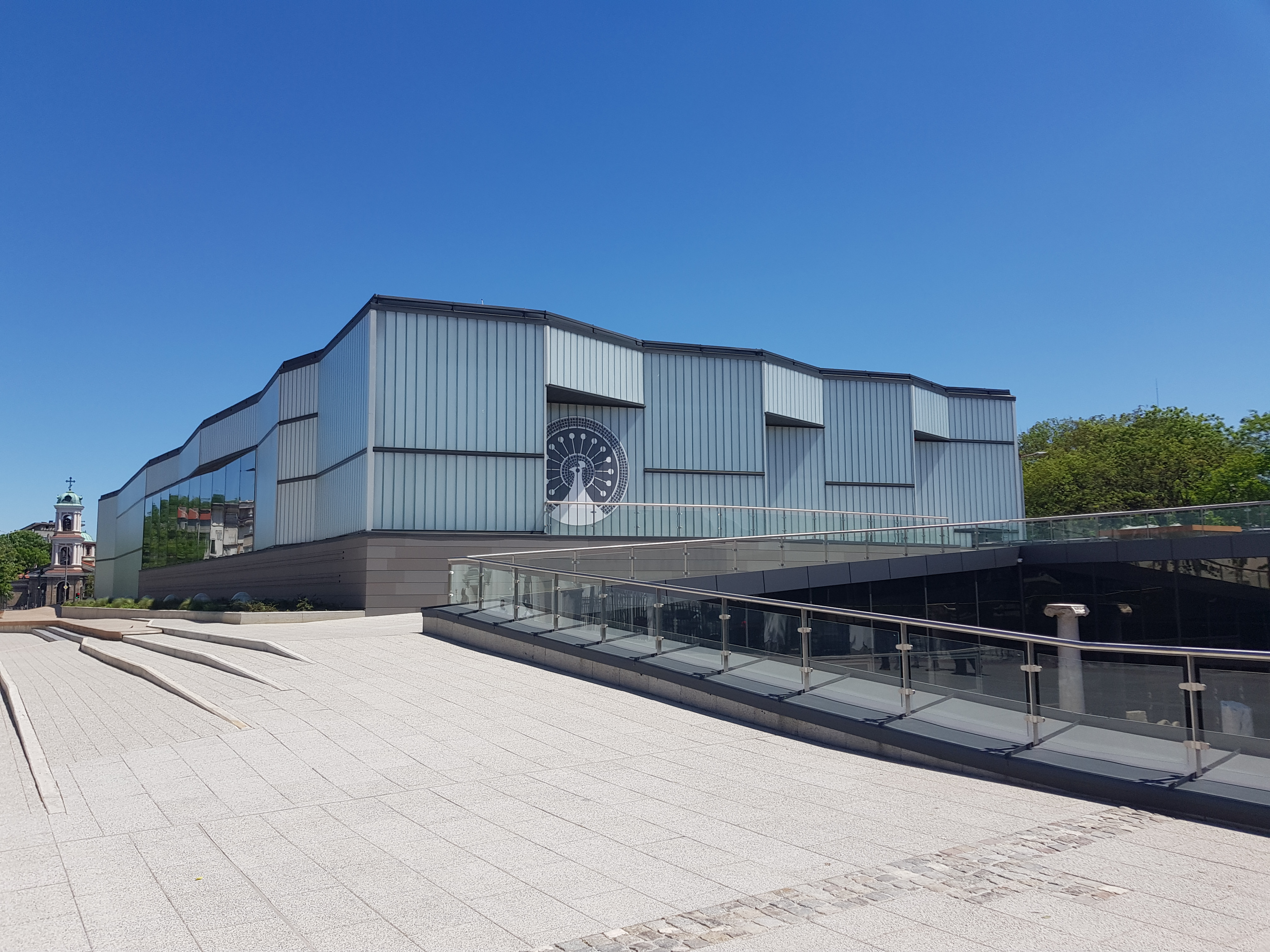
- The Bishop's Basilica of Philippopolis

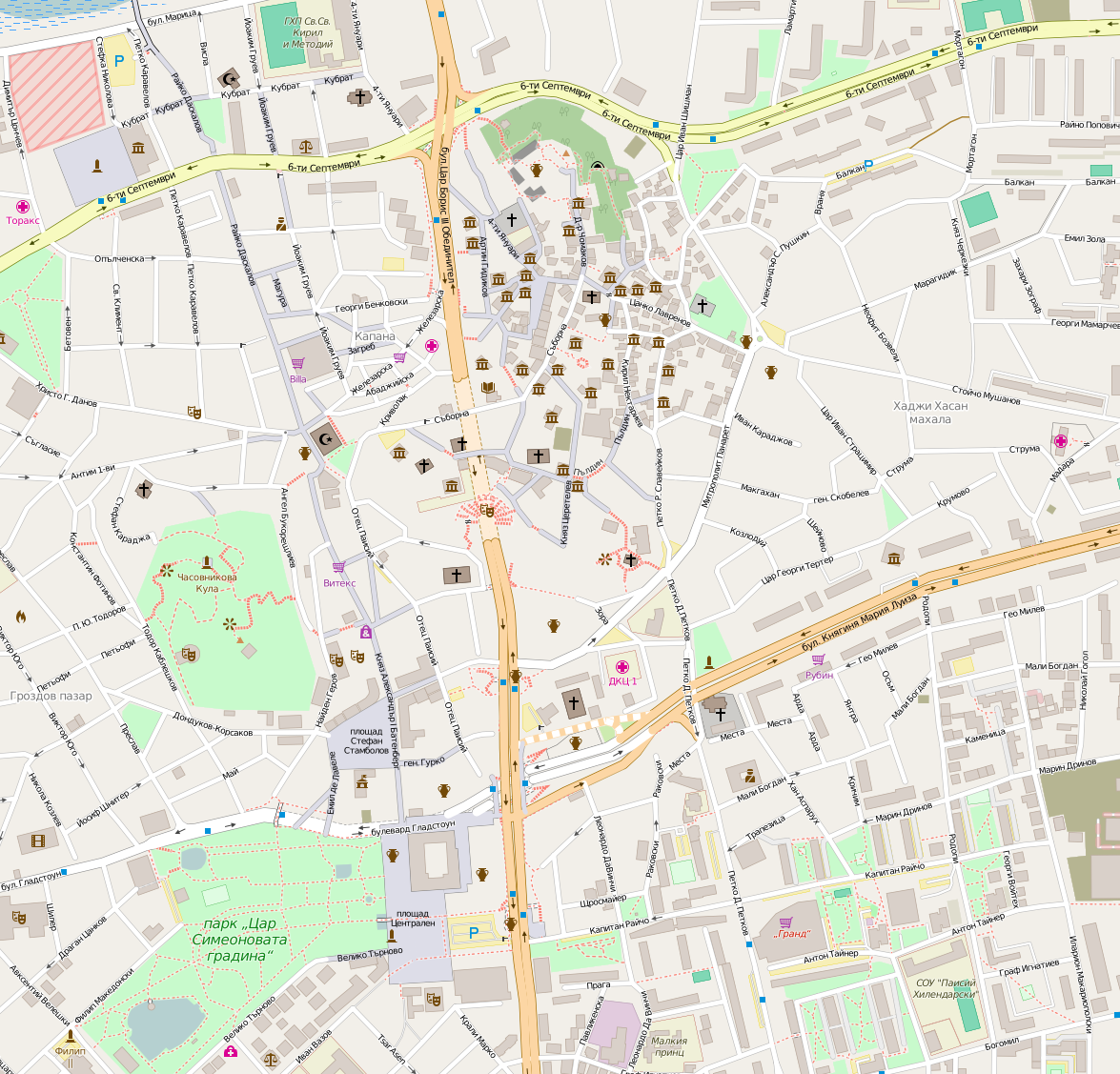
- Location within Plovdiv City Center
- 42.144118°N 24.752732°E
- Type: Basilica
- Periods: Late Antiquity
- Cultures: Roman Empire
- Location: Plovdiv, Bulgaria

History
- Built: 4th century AD
- Abandoned: Late 6th century

Site notes
- Material: Roman brick, marble
- Length: 86.4 m (283 ft)
- Width: 38.5 m (126 ft)
- Excavation dates: 1982–1985, 2015–2019
- Archaeologists: Elena Kesyakova
- Condition: under excavation and restoration
- Owner: Plovdiv Municipality

The Bishop's Basilica of Philippopolis, also known as the Great Basilica, (Bulgarian: Епископска базилика на Филипопол) is a ruined church from the ancient city of Philippopolis in Plovdiv and built in the mid-4th century AD. It is the largest late antique early-Christian church discovered in Bulgaria and one of the largest from that period on the Balkans. Its architecture included a central and two side naves, an apse, a narthex (anteroom), and a colonnaded atrium (inner court). A marble-decorated presbyterium (a platform for the bishop and the clergy) rose in the central nave.

The Great Basilica with its magnificent floor mosaics has been excavated over many years and is now preserved in a new museum (2021).

== Location ==
The Bishop's Basilica is located in the central part of Plovdiv, next to the 19th-century Roman Catholic Cathedral of St Louis and Kyaginya Maria Luiza Blvd.

== Building ==
The basilica was built in the mid-4th century AD, probably over an earlier building with a similar plan which covered the space for two insulae (quarters defined by four perpendicular streets). It was demolished and abandoned, probably as a result of an earthquake.

The dimensions of the basilica are extremely large for the period. The overall length of the basilica is 86.30 m and its width is 38.50 m. The aisles are separated from the nave by a colonnade of 13 bays: every two marble columns were followed by one masonry pier, to a total of 14. It has two aisles either side of the nave and an apse at the east end of the nave. There was an atrium surrounded by a colonnade on three sides to the west.

The large size of the building, the rich decoration of mosaics and the specifics in the altar area organisation give reason to suppose that the building was most probably the Bishop's basilica (the cathedral). At the beginning of the restoration process, only the south and part of the central nave have been excavated and studied. The rest lay under the nearby road connection Maria Luiza Blvd. and Tsar Boris III Obedinitel Blvd. In 2016, further excavation works began, with the aim of discovering the north aisle of the basilica. Today, the site is entirely excavated and studied by the archaeological and restoration team.

The most interesting findings at the basilica are the mosaics that covered the floor. They spread across an area of nearly 22 000 sq. ft. revealing extremely interesting motives, without analog in Bulgaria. The floors were covered with intricate mosaics with geometrical designs; eternal knot symbols; vases pouring out the water of eternal life; and an astonishing array of birds, the early-Christian symbols of pious souls. There is a difference in the composition and motives of the mosaics in the south aisle and the central nave, suggesting that most probably they were made by different craftsmen.

The mosaics in the basilica

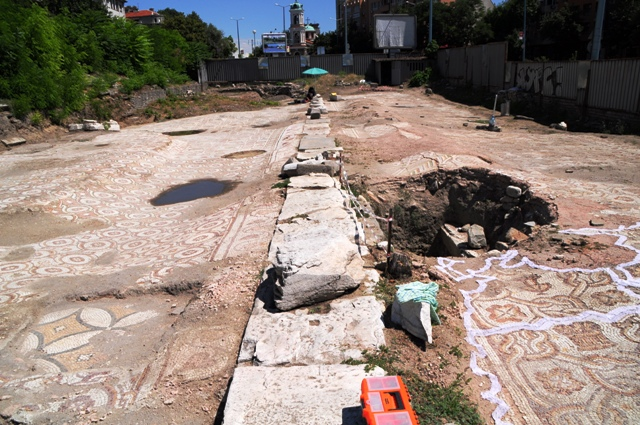

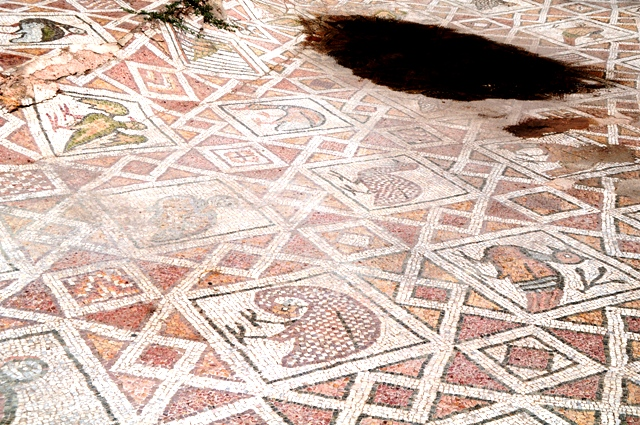

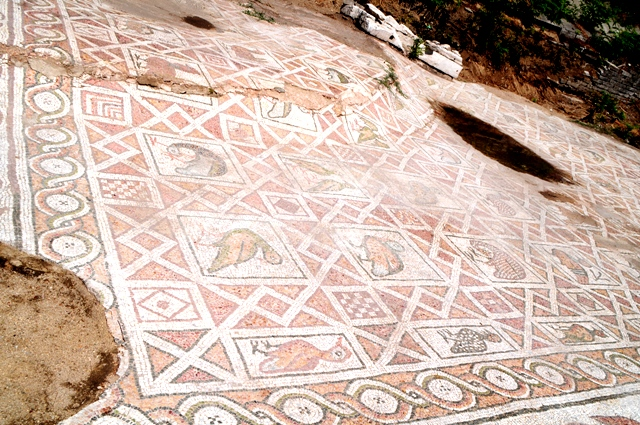

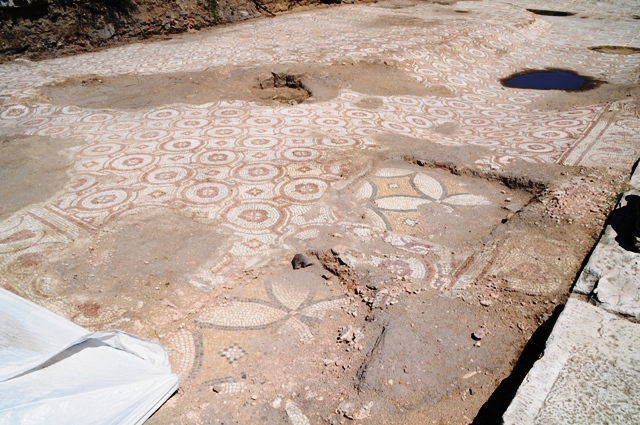

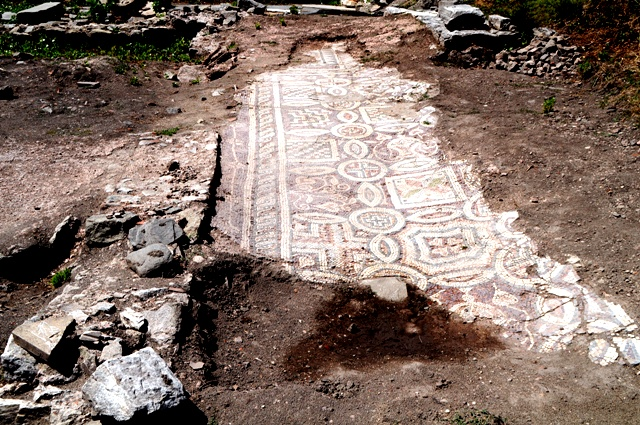

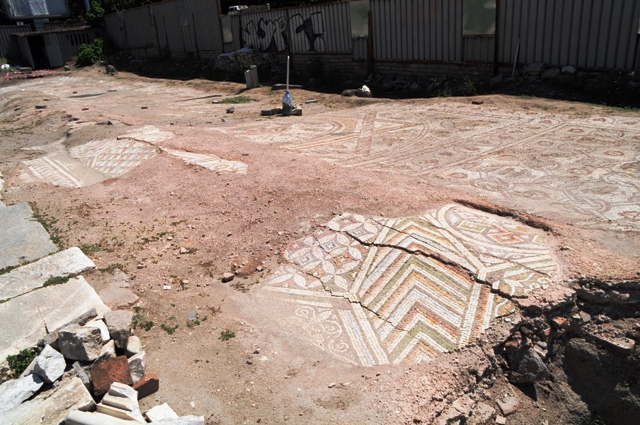

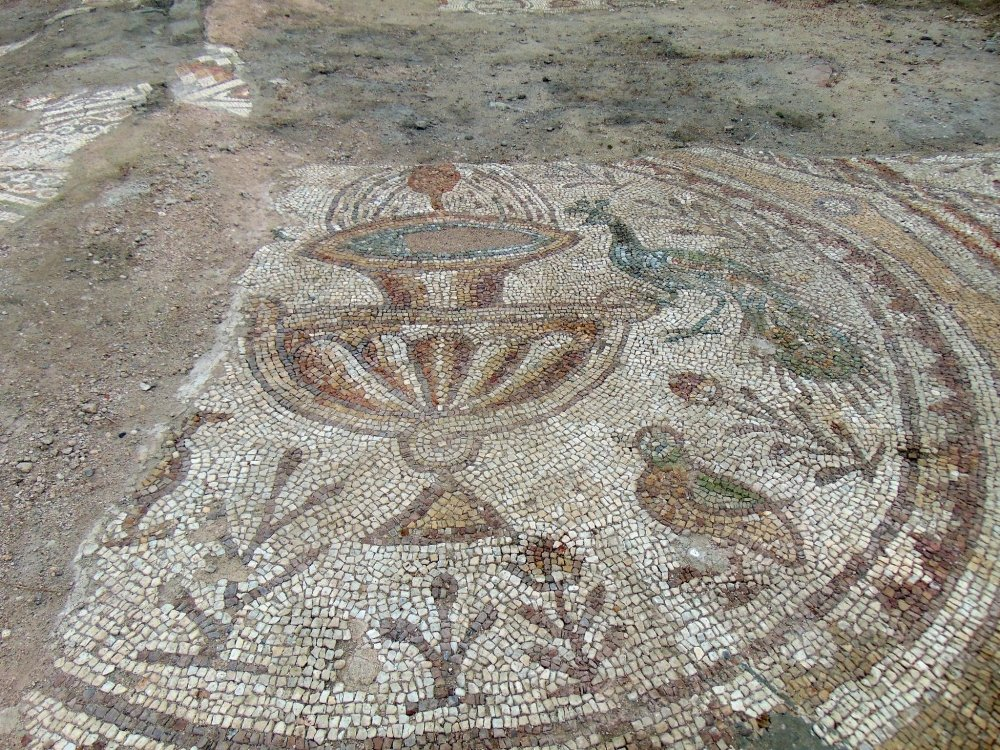

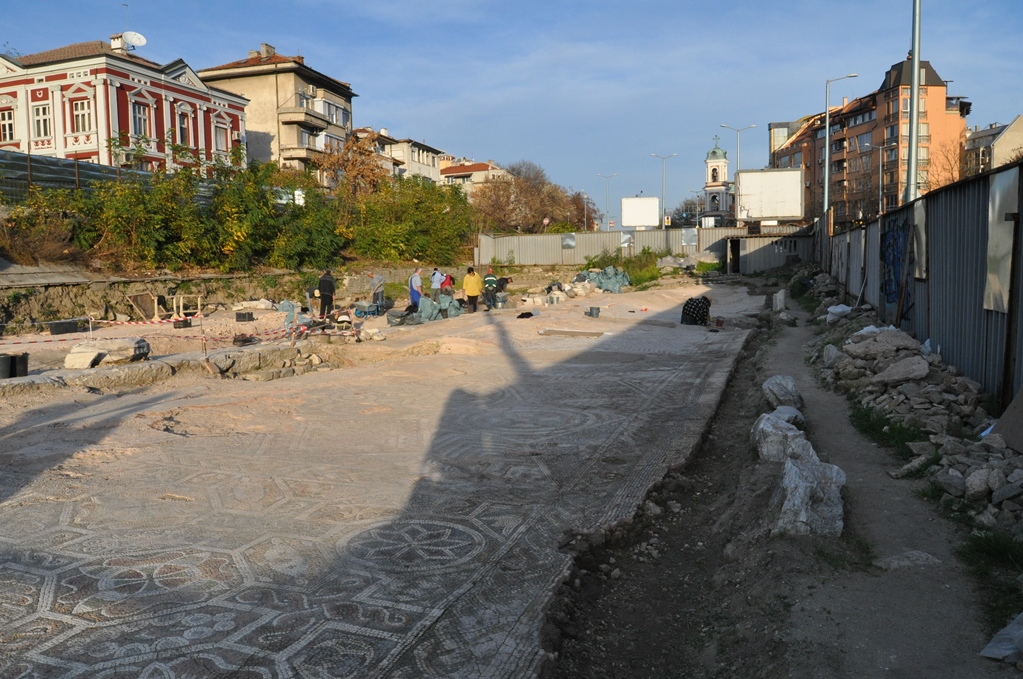

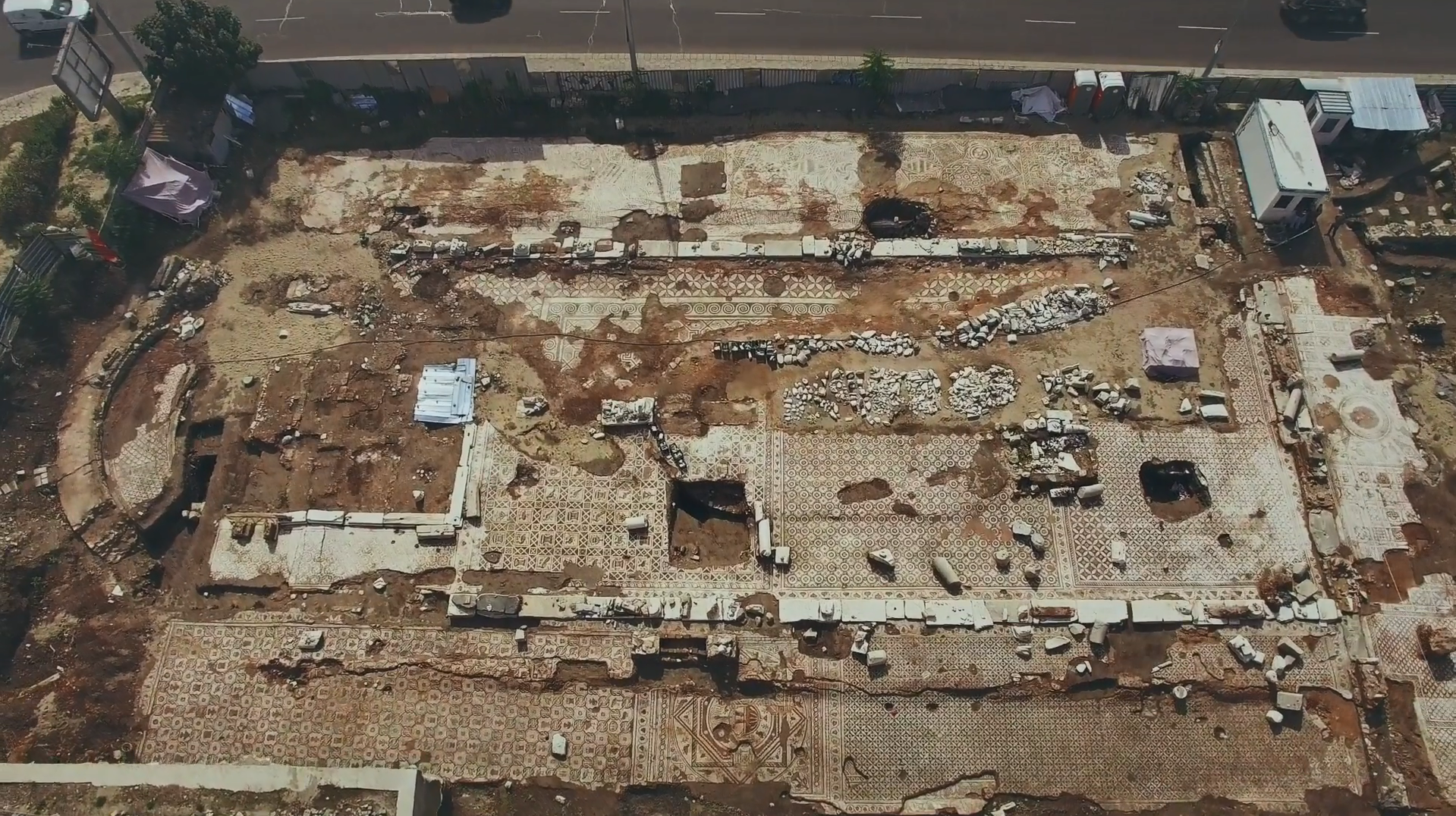

== History ==
History of the Bishop's basilica

Classical antiquity
Early Christianity
Middle Ages
Modern Period

Axis scale is in centuries AD.

A coin dating back to the times of Emperor Licinius (308-324) discovered during the excavations of the Bishop’s Basilica, has spawned the hypothesis that the basilica was among the first to be erected in the Roman Empire after Christianity was legalized, in 313. Its dimensions, its decoration and its central location near the ancient city’s forum indicate the existence of a sizable and influential Christian community in Philippopolis.

Its interior was adorned by columns with Christian symbols on their capitals, by murals and lavish mosaic floors. The mosaics are the best-preserved elements of the building. They were executed in three stages, form two layers and have a total area of 2,000 square meters.

The church was at the heart of the city’s Christian life in the 4th- 6th centuries until it was demolished and abandoned, probably as a result of an earthquake.

The basilica was erected over the ruins of an ancient building probably dating back to the 1st century AD. After it was abandoned in the 10th-12th centuries, its location was taken up by a large Christian necropolis which had a cemetery church decorated with fine murals.

The Bishop’s Basilica of ancient Philippopolis has a central location in modern Plovdiv as well. It is near the central square and the St. Ludwig Catholic Cathedral, providing an everlasting example for the continuity of spiritual ideas that the various generations have handed down through the centuries.

== Ornithofaunal analysis of mosaics ==
In 2018, Prof. Zlatozar Boev published a detailed study on the bird mosaic images depicted inside the basilica. According to him, exotic birds are not represented in the modern Bulgarian fauna. Among them are a Western swamphen, also known as sultana, an Egyptian goose, a large Alexandrine parakeet, a helmeted guineafowl, an Abyssinian partridge, an African green pigeon and a spur-winged goose. These exotic bird species make up 1/3 of all well-known species (including domesticated species such as the Indian peafowl and the domestic hen) among the mosaics of this remarkable monument of ancient art.

Seven of the 20 recognized bird species are exotic, and today their main habitat is North and Sub-Saharan Africa. These birds have a characteristic plumage color (and a specific diagnostic habit) and undoubtedly prove the relations of the Romans far to the south, beyond the widely accepted borders of the Roman Empire. All exotic birds (except domestic peacocks) are now distributed in East Africa in Ethiopia, Eritrea and South Sudan. This region remained beyond the southeastern borders of the Roman Empire even at the time of its greatest expansion (in 117) and is located about 1,000 kilometers from the once southernmost borders of the Roman lands to the east. Nowadays, all these species, except the guinea fowl and the sultana, have a trans-Saharan distribution.

All these exotic birds were depicted without from life. This means that living individuals of the seven exotic bird species were brought to ancient Philippopolis, where they were depicted as the main decorative elements of the floor mosaic decoration of the Bishop's basilica. The presence of such images confirms the ancient Trans-Saharan Roman-Ethiopian relations.

== Excavation and restoration ==
Remains of the basilica were discovered during the construction of an underpass in the mid-1980s. Archeologists surveyed the south nave, part of the central nave, the apse and a portion of the atrium. The mosaics were removed to the Plovdiv Archaeological Museum. Funding was scarce in this period.

On 26 September 2014, a project for the restoration and conservation of the basilica was presented, according to which the remains of the ancient church will become a museum complex of a modern type, which combines traditional exhibition techniques with innovative technological solutions such as augmented and virtual reality, interactive games in children's playground and a mosaic studio. To date, the total amount of the investment exceeds BGN 15 million, and the investment is covered by Plovdiv Municipality and the America for Bulgaria Foundation. The project has begun by the time when the mayor of Plovdiv was er. Ivan Totev (2011-2019), and it will be opened to the public under the government of the current mayor Zdravko Dimitrov. The site's completion is expected in early 2021, when the unique mosaics, with a total area of 2,000 square meters, will finally be presented to visitors. The project includes protective construction on two levels, which will allow the exhibition of the two mosaic layers - at the ground level mosaics will be displayed "in sito", ie. on site, and on the second level will be exhibited the upper, second layer with mosaics.

The conservation, restoration, display and protective cover project is one of the most important initiatives of Plovdiv Municipality and the city itself, which in 2019 was recognized as European Capital of Culture. To complete the Bishop’s Basilica, the municipality has concluded agreements with the Ministry of Culture and America for Bulgaria Foundation. Restoration of the Bishop’s Basilica of Philippopolis is supported not just by the state institutions and agencies but also by the local community and businesses. The archaeological excavations in 2016-2017 were aided by more than 450 volunteers. They included school students and lawyers, journalists and engineers, architects and builders, tourist guides and NGO representatives, judges and prosecutors, classical musicians and writers, members of the diplomatic corps, Bulgarians and citizens from all over.

Site's research and restoration was led by assoc. prof. Elena Kantareva-Decheva (Chief Restorer), Elena Kesyakova (Lead Archeologist, 1982 – 1986, 2014), and Zheni Tankova (Lead Archeologist, 2015 – 2019). Involved in this remarkable project were also assoc. prof. dr. Konstantin Kisyov (Director, Regional Archeological Museum - Plovdiv), assist. Prof. Nikolay Sharankov (Epigrapher), dr. Stanislav Stanev (Liturgical planning), and many more devoted and hardworking people.

Bishop's basilica museum

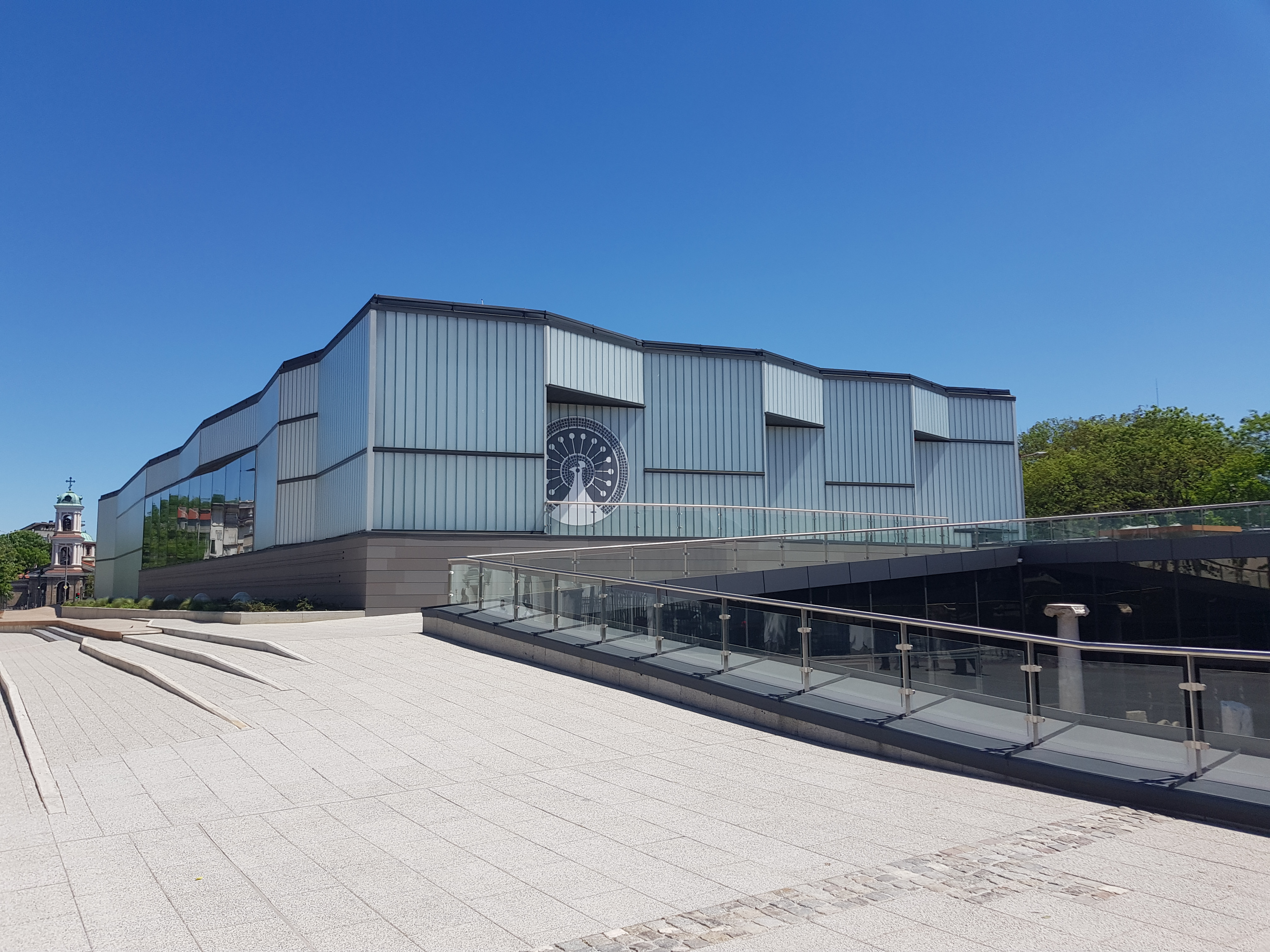

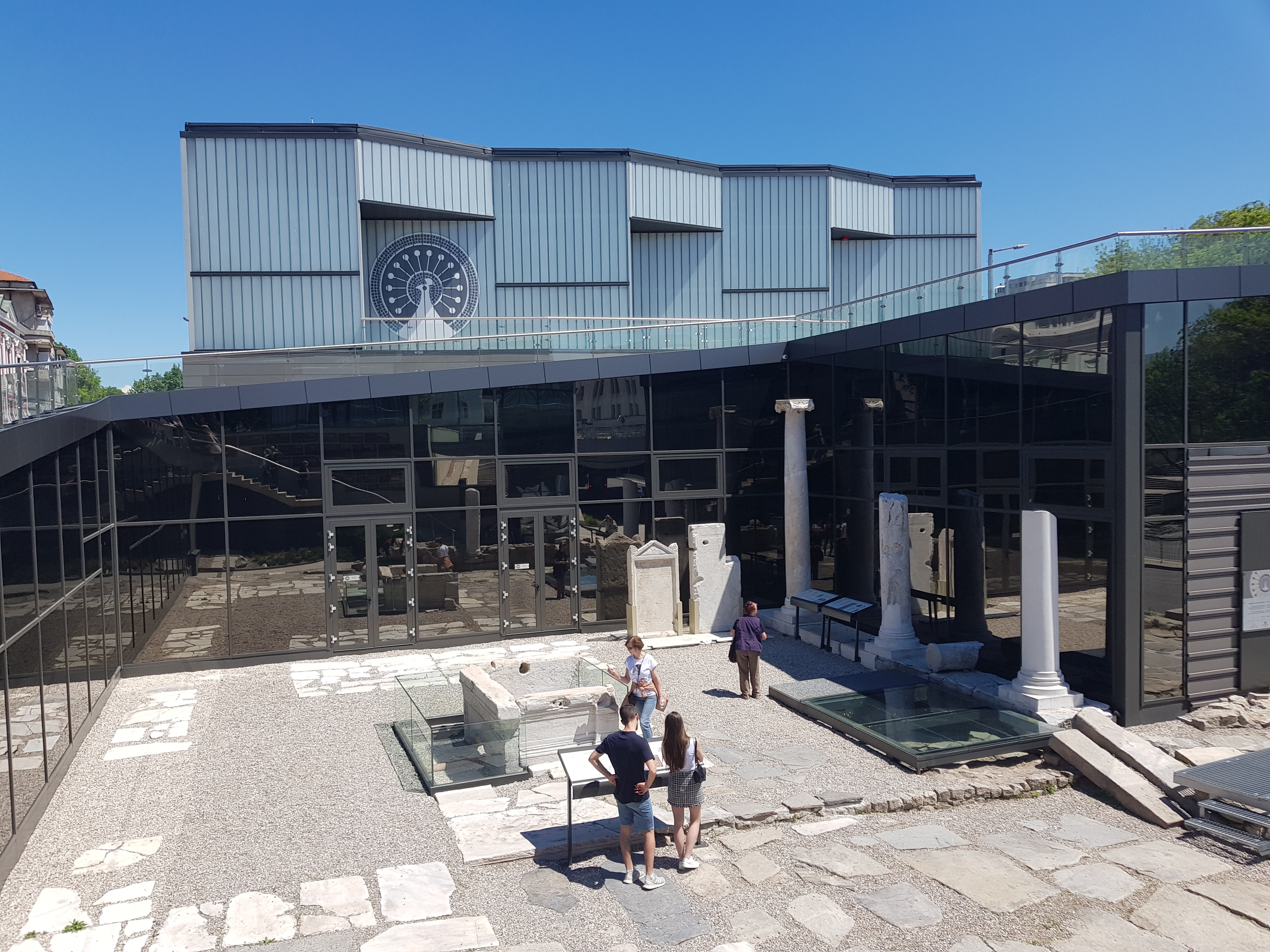

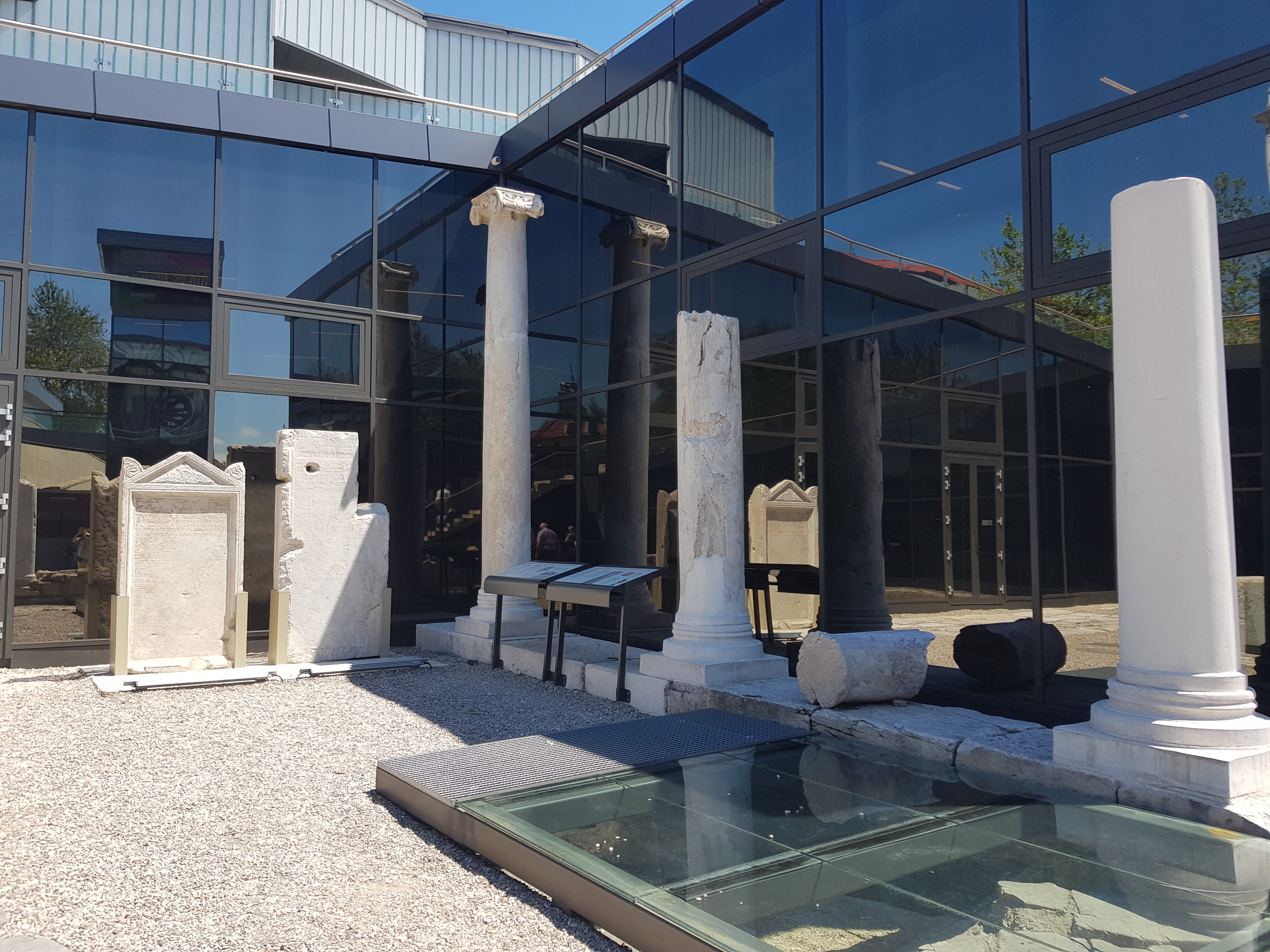

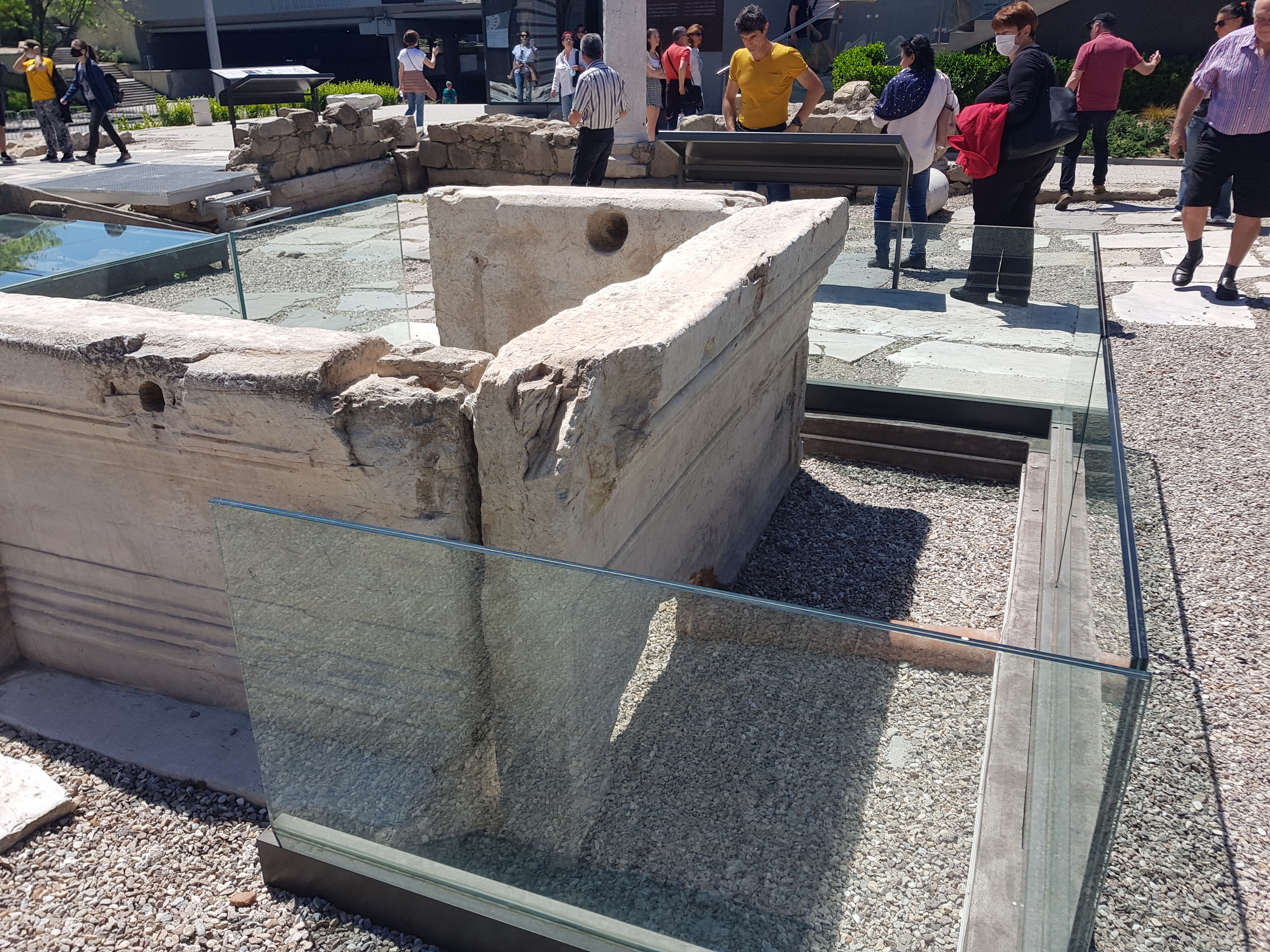

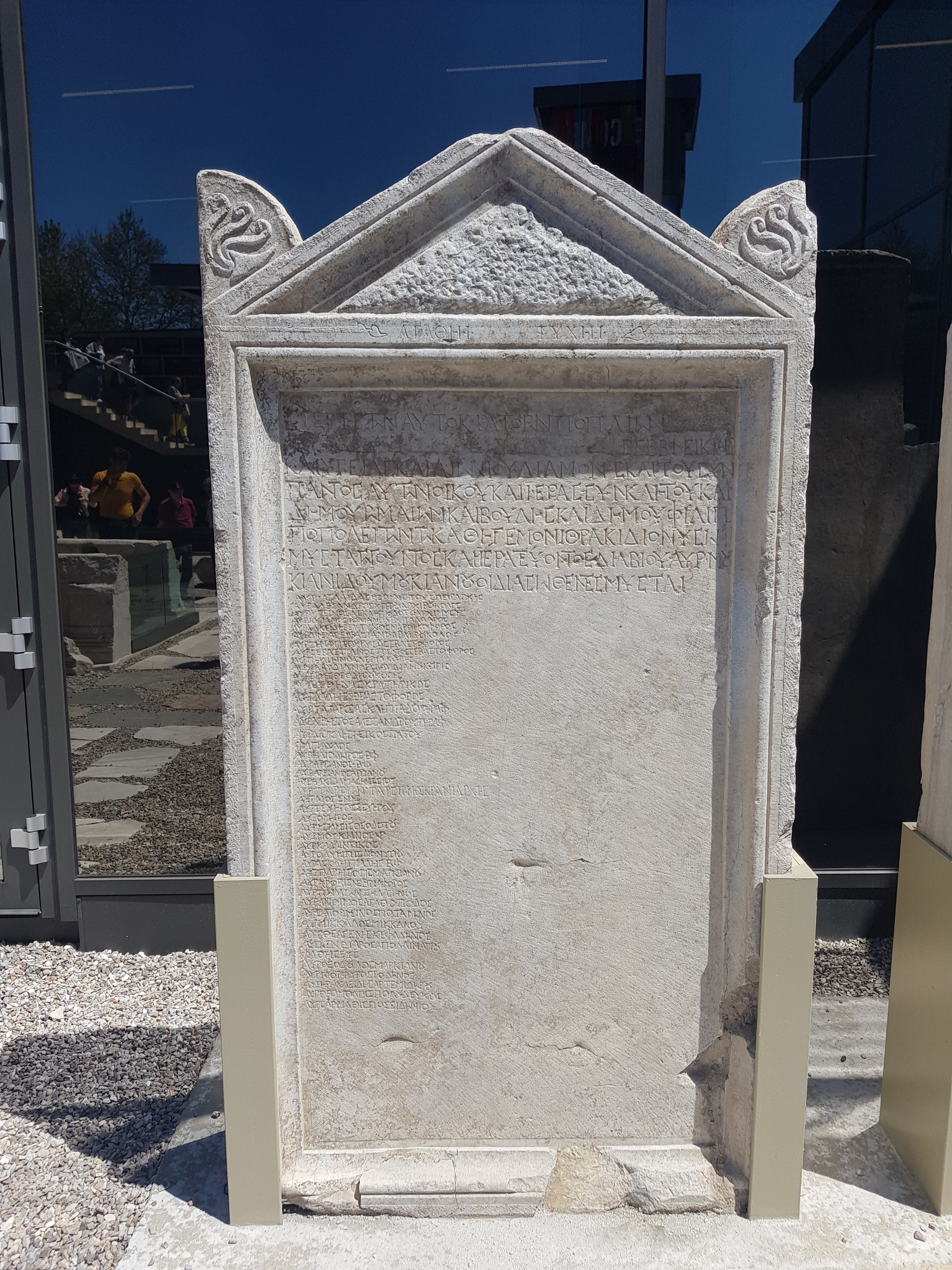

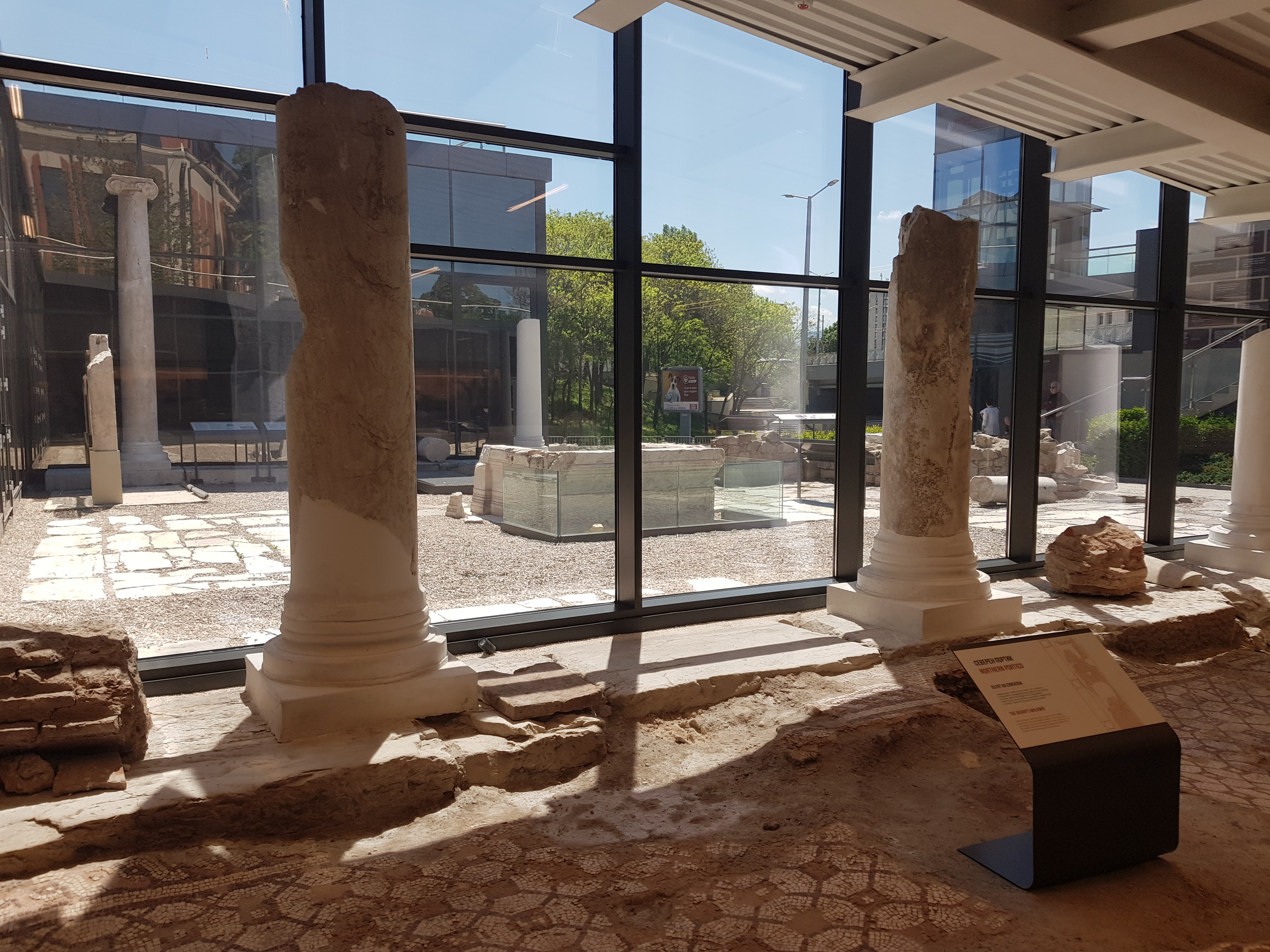

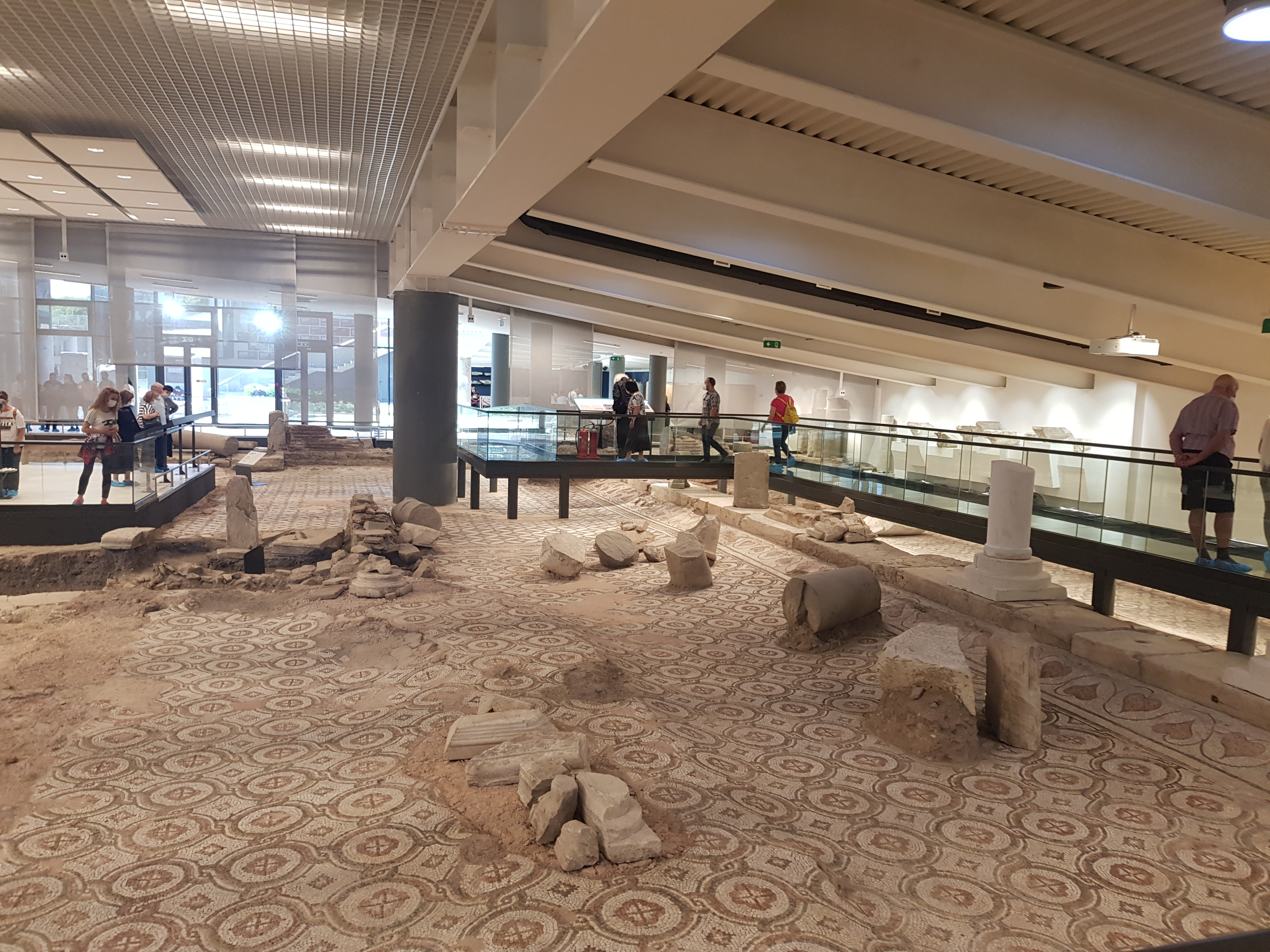

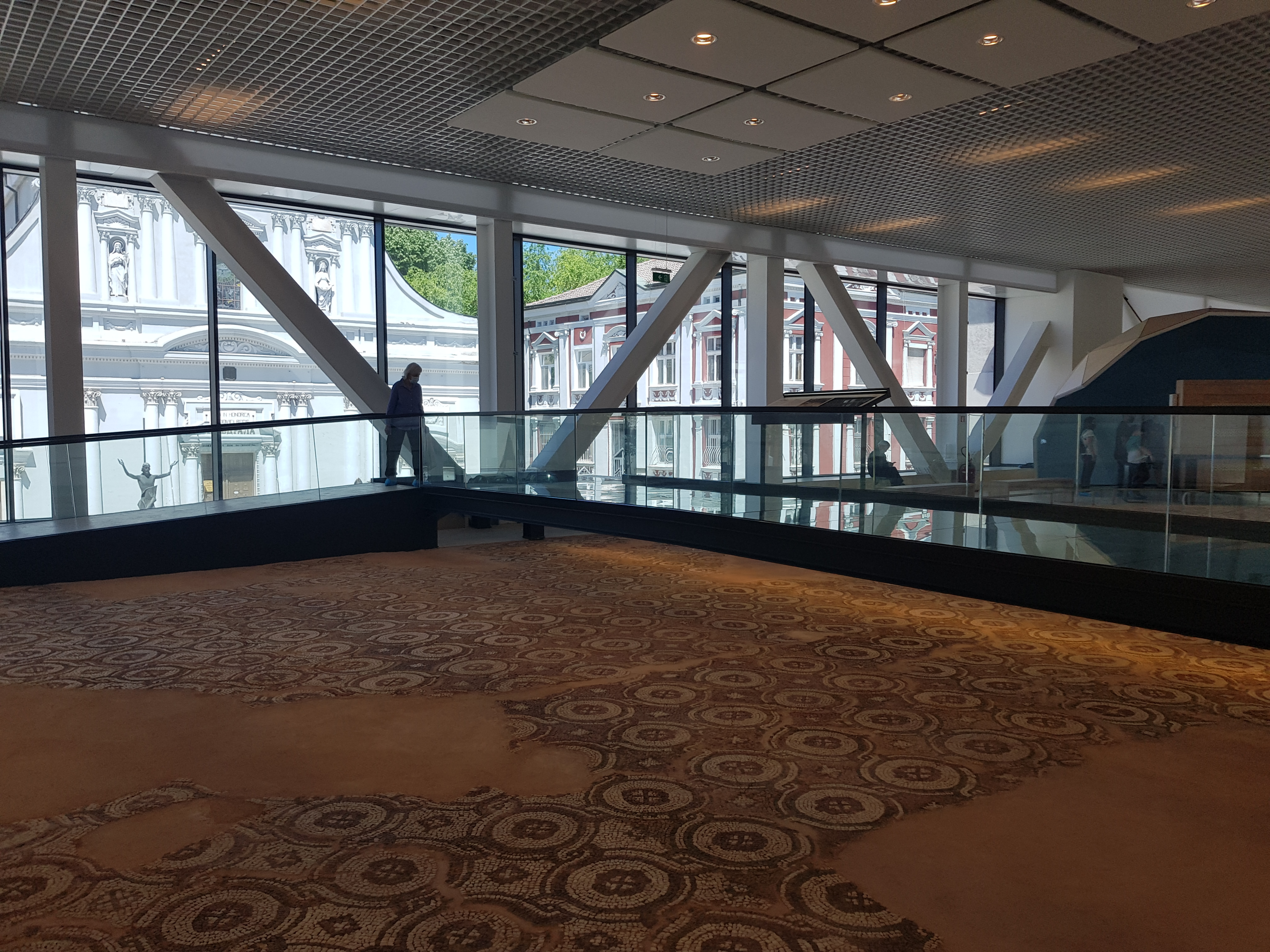

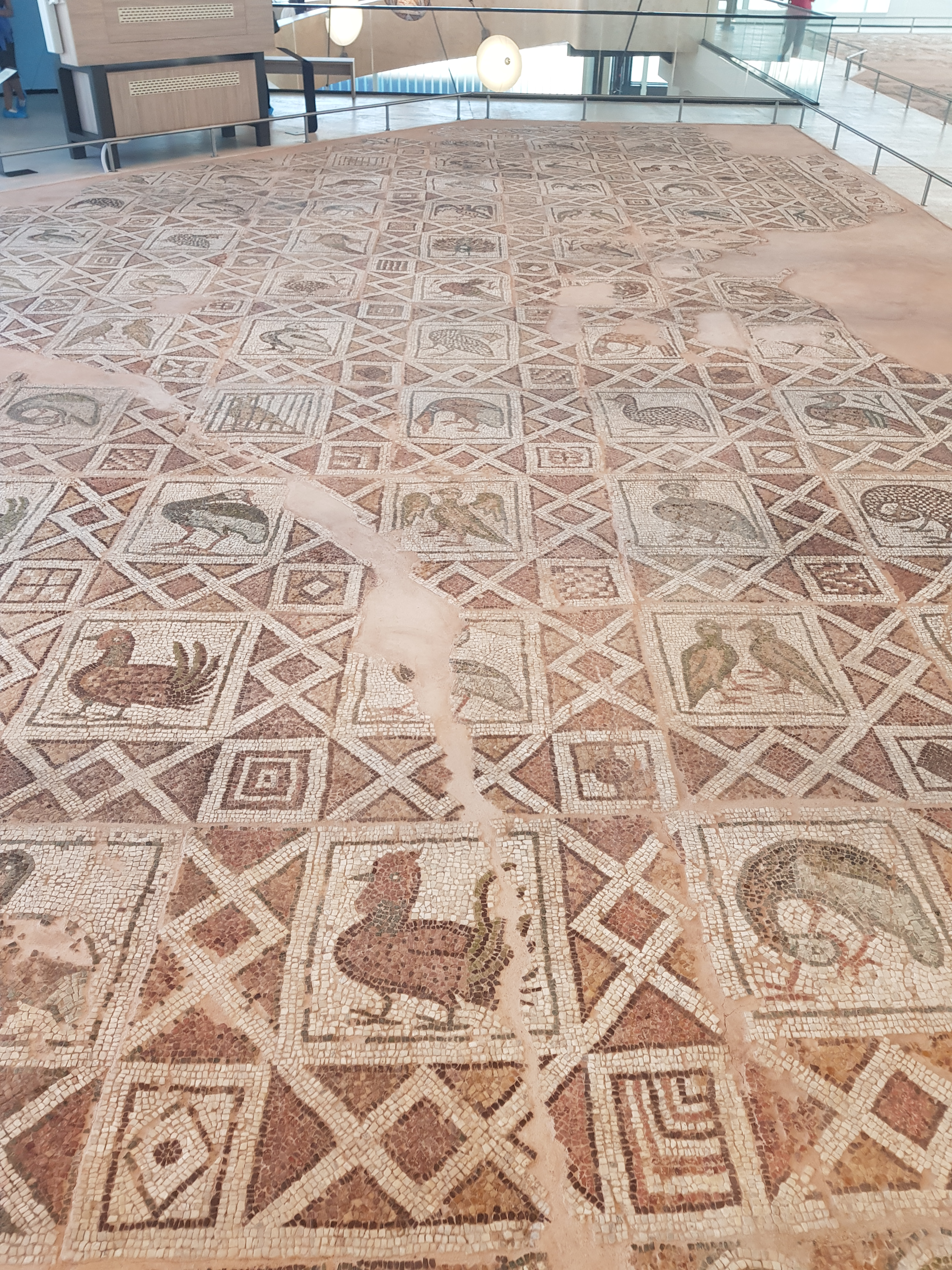

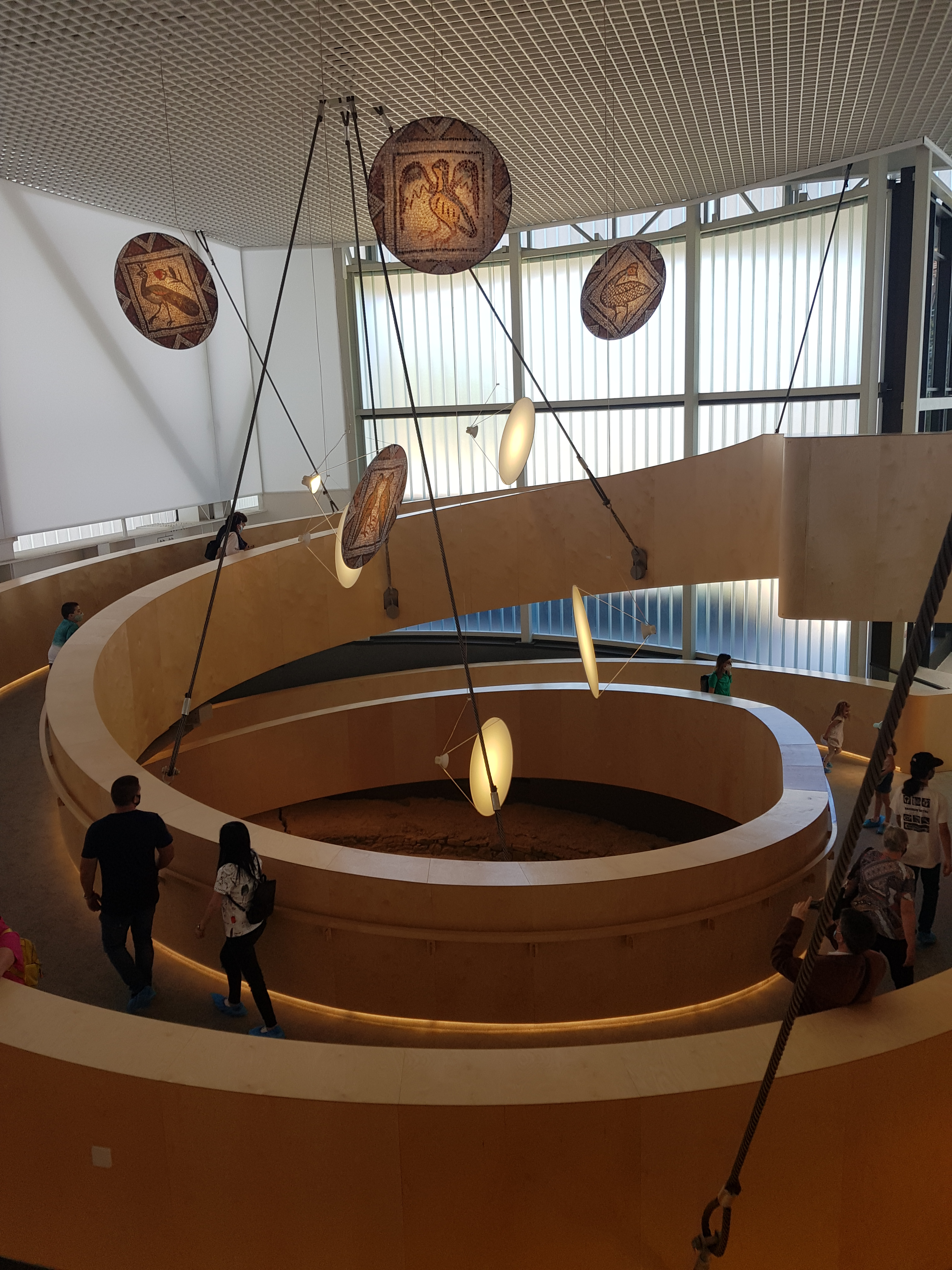

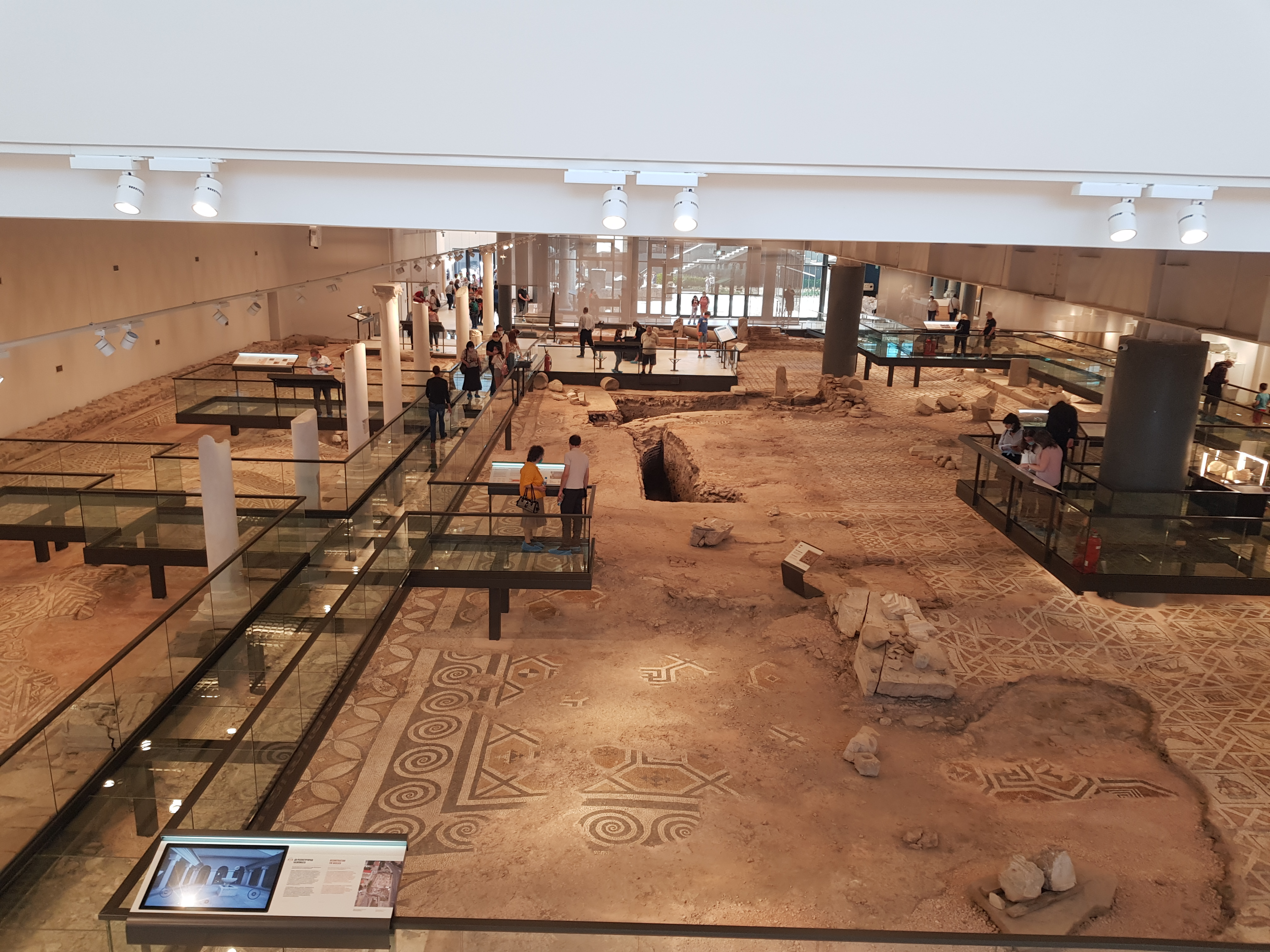

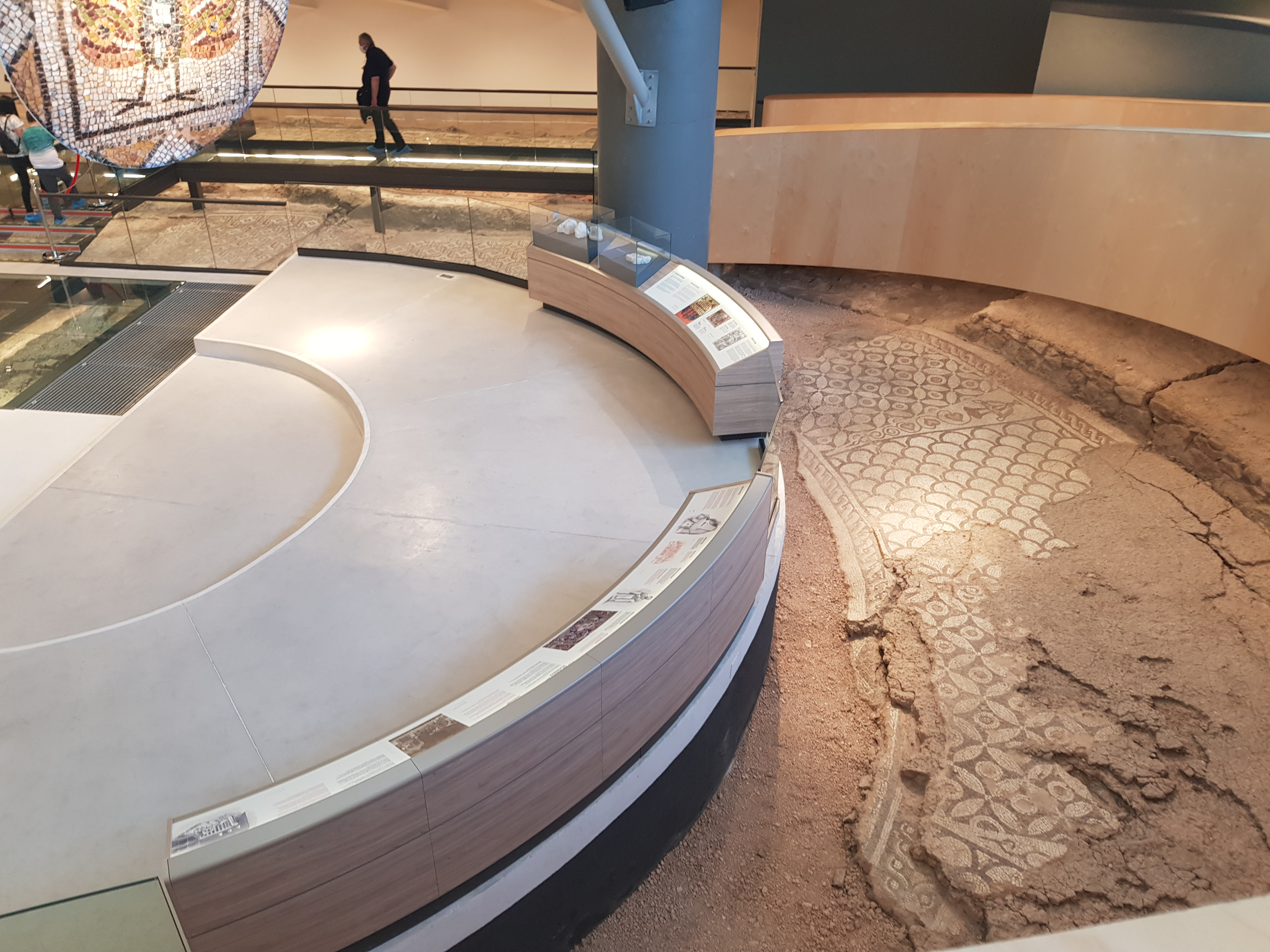

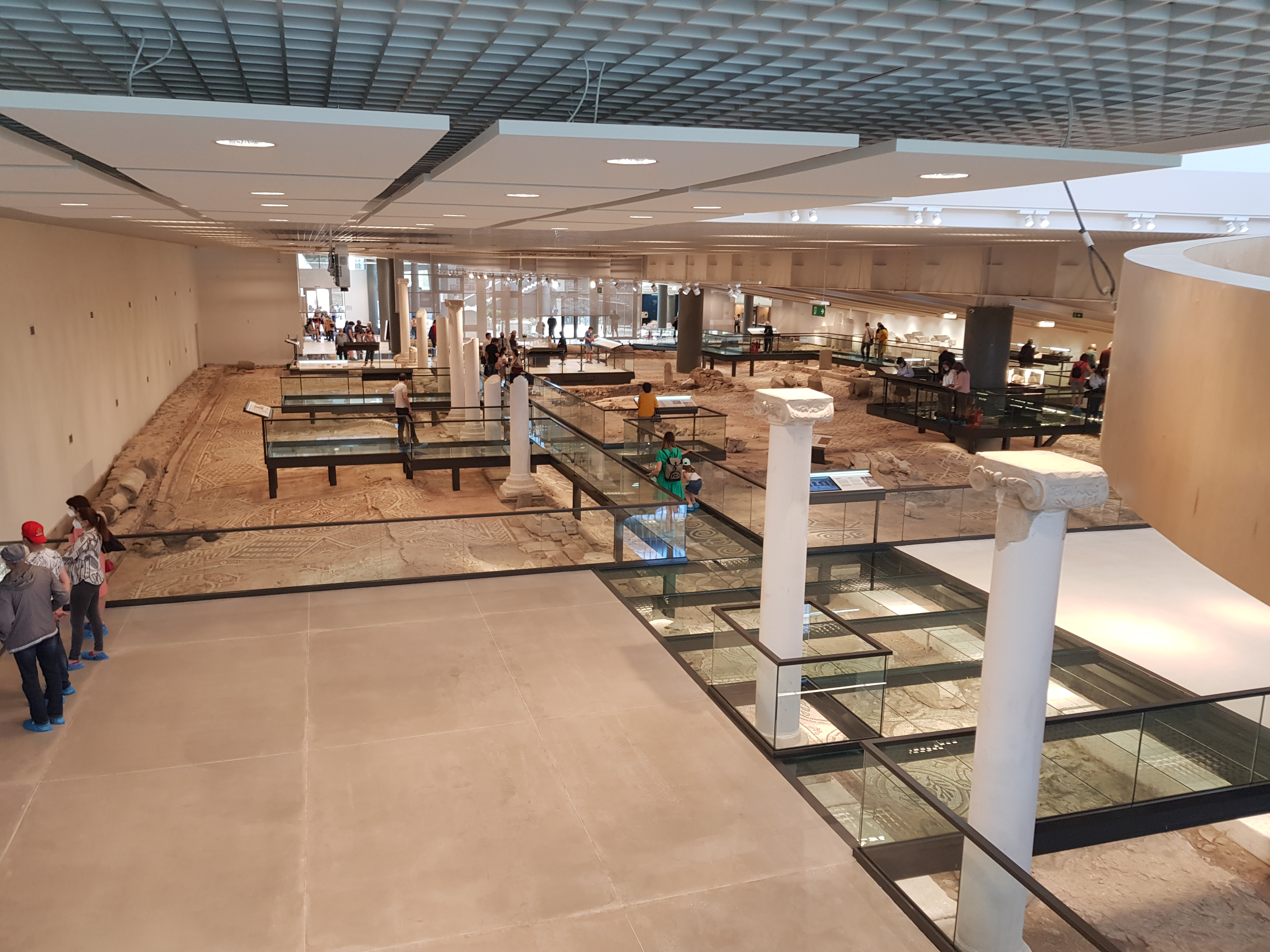

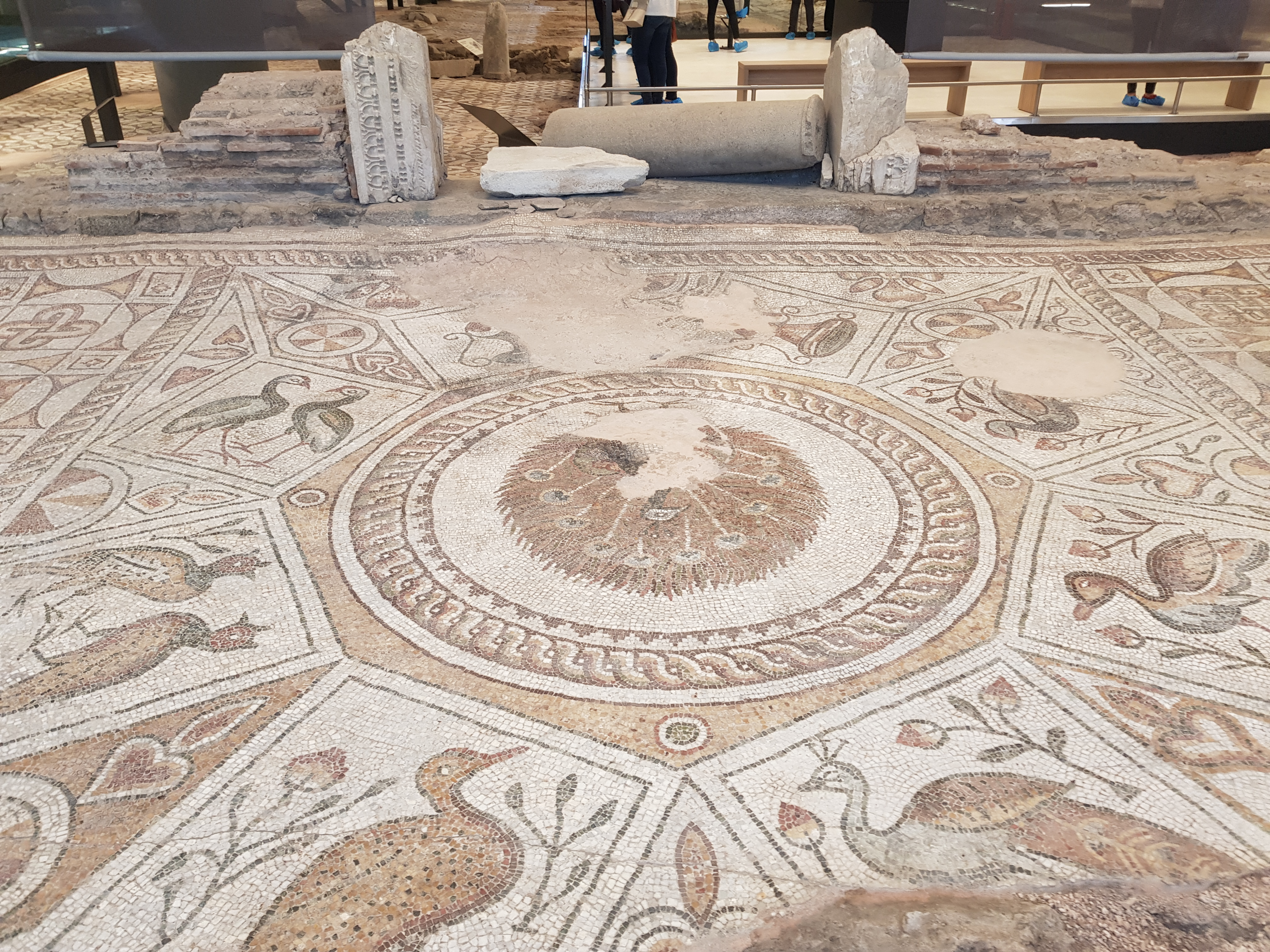

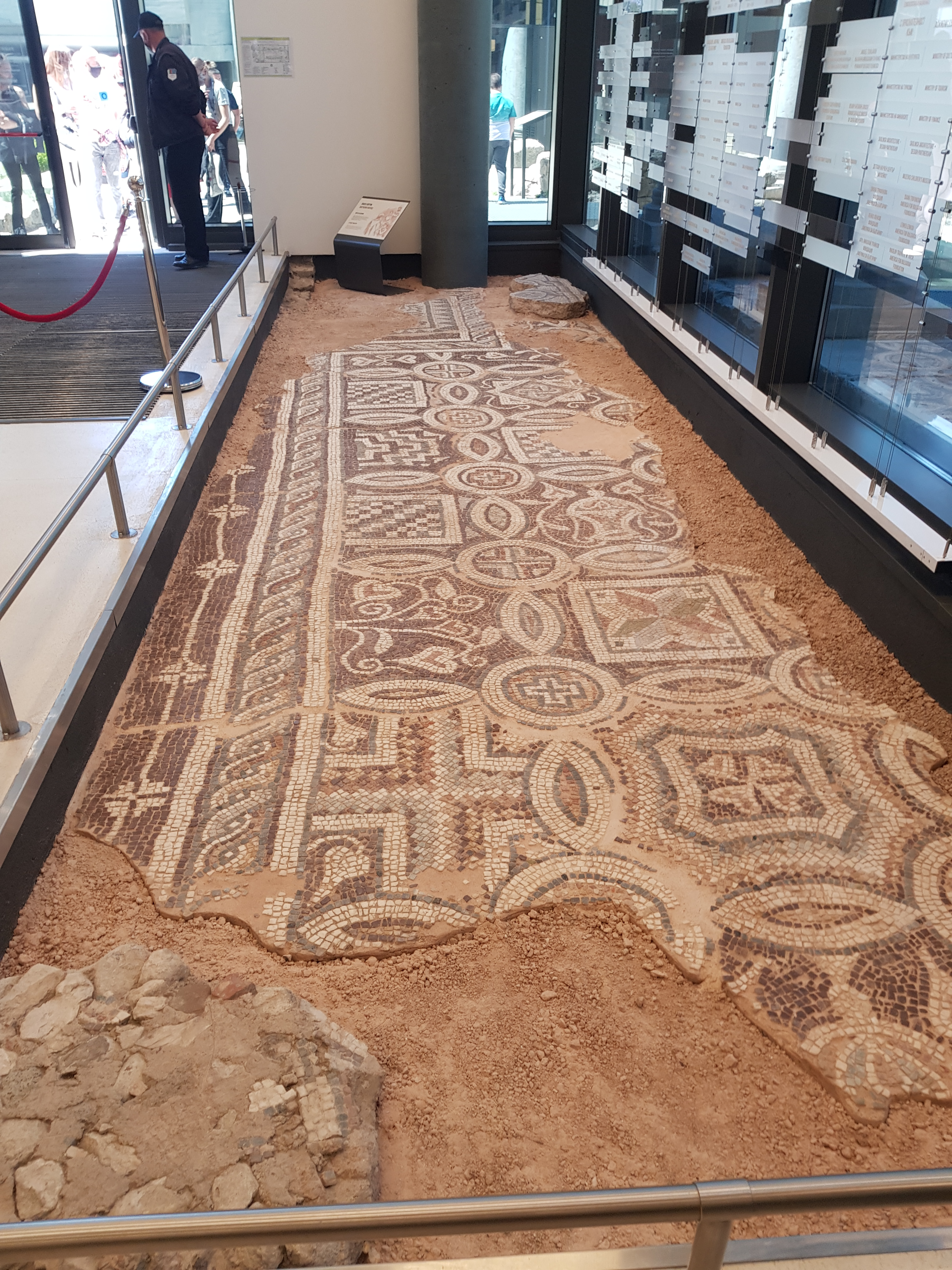

== Gallery ==
Bishop's Basilica of Philippopolis

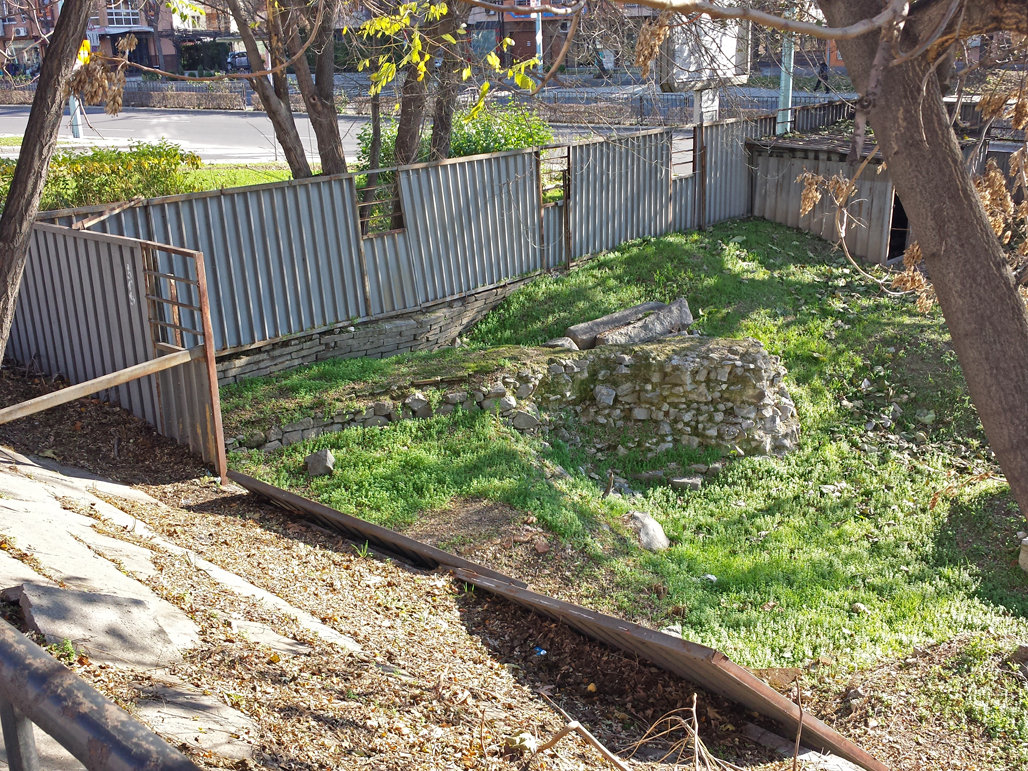

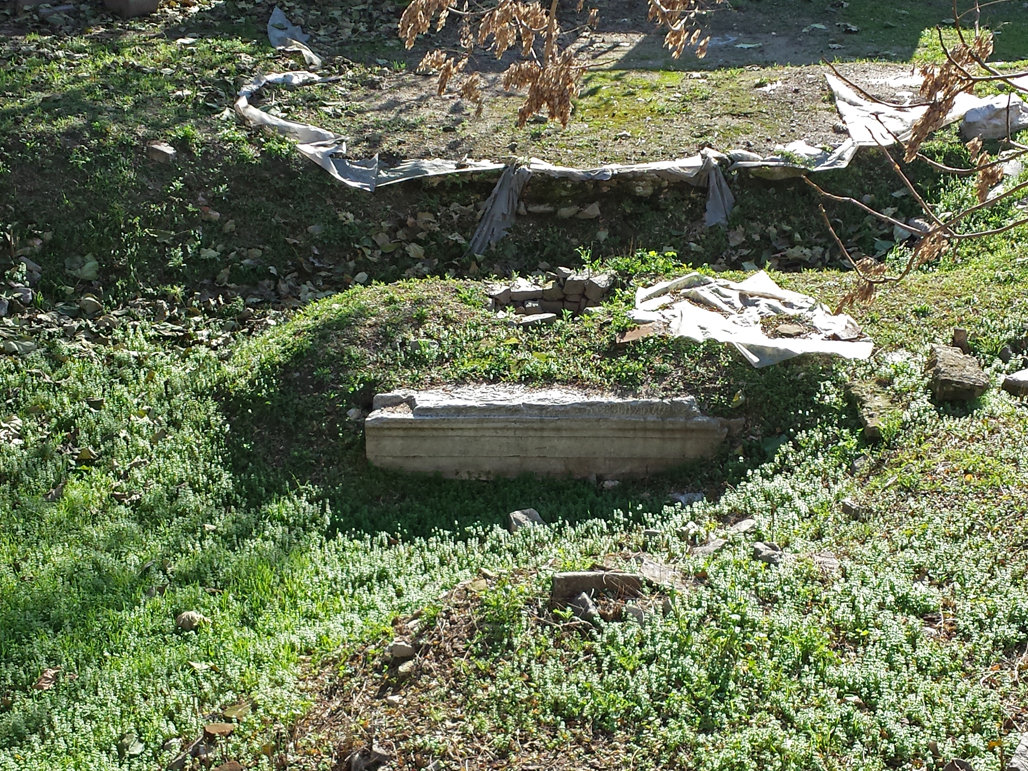

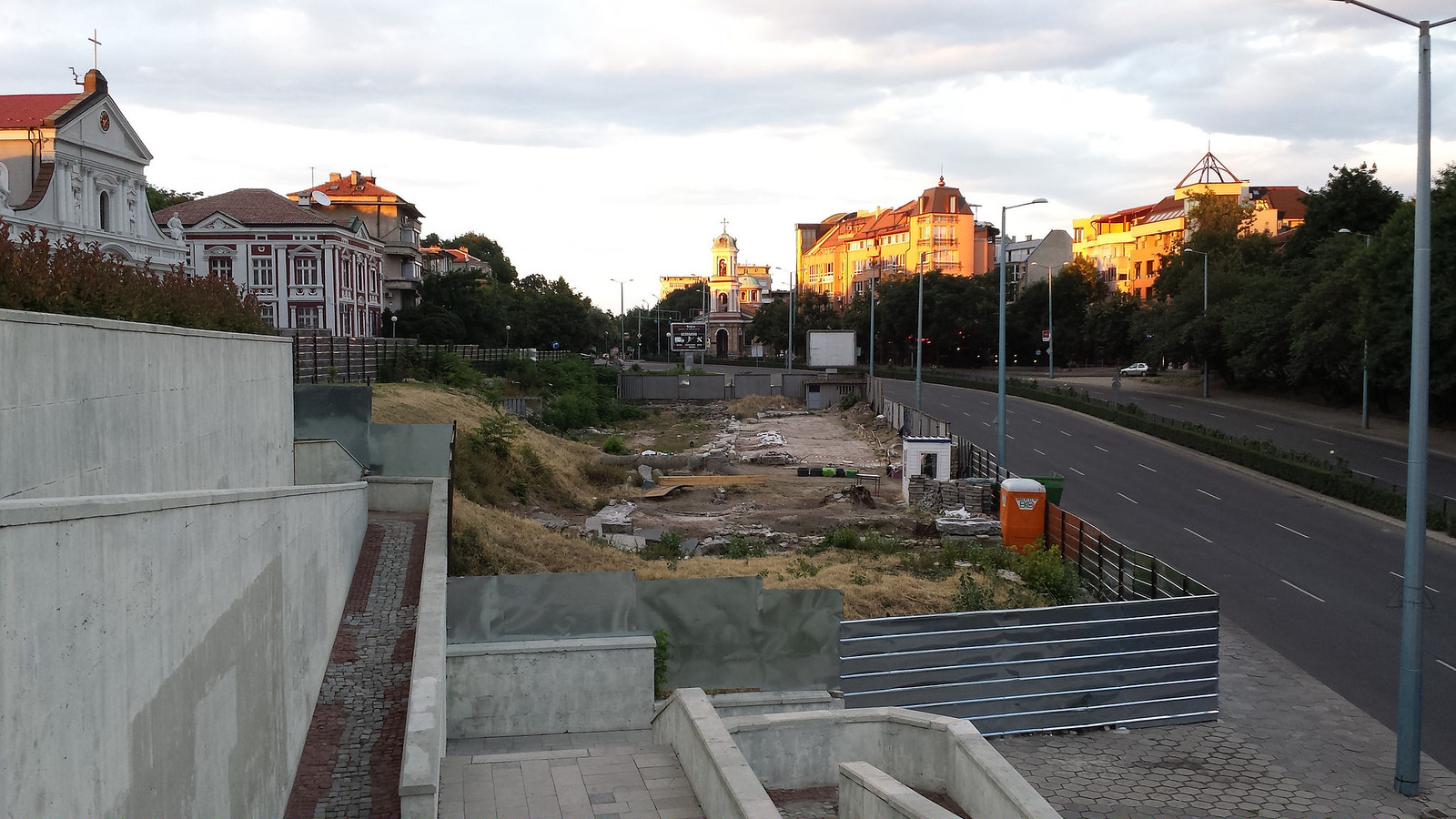

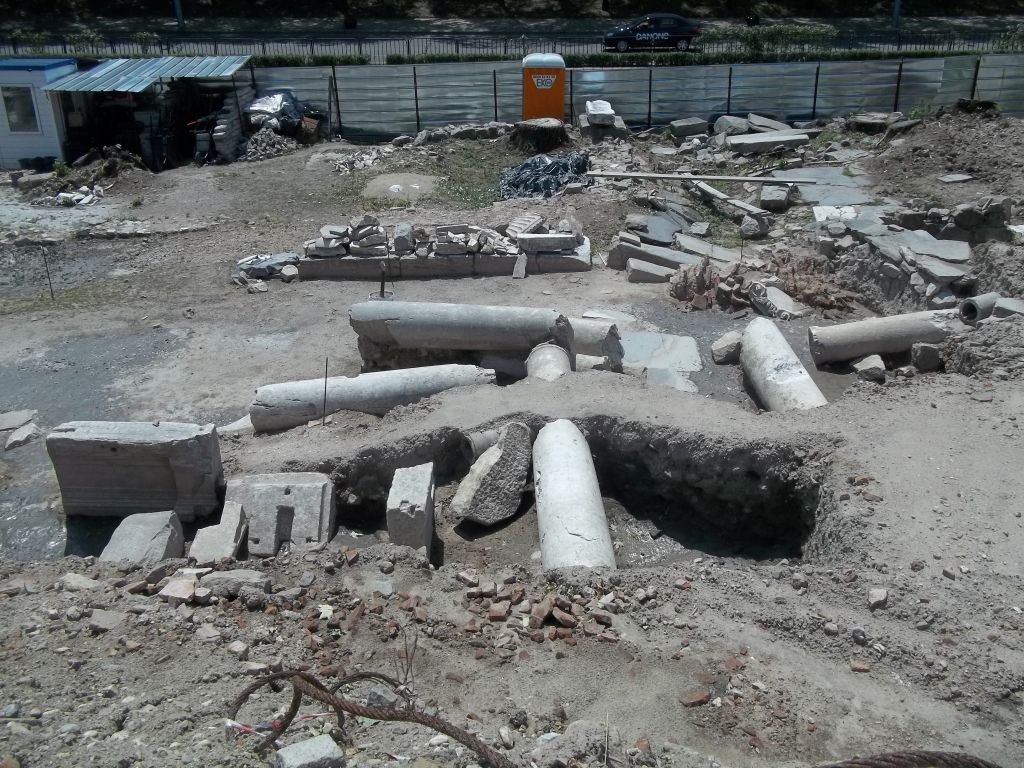

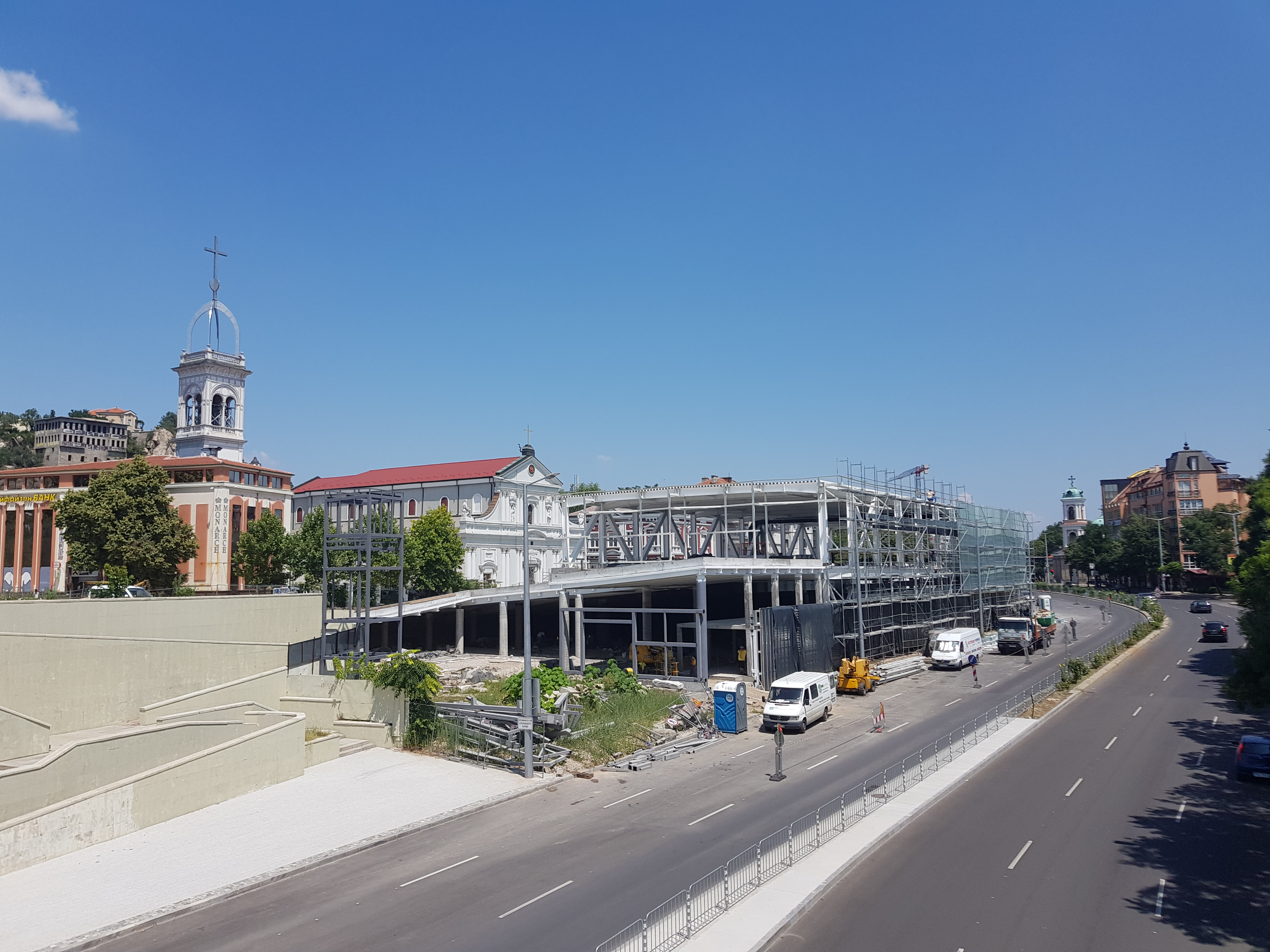

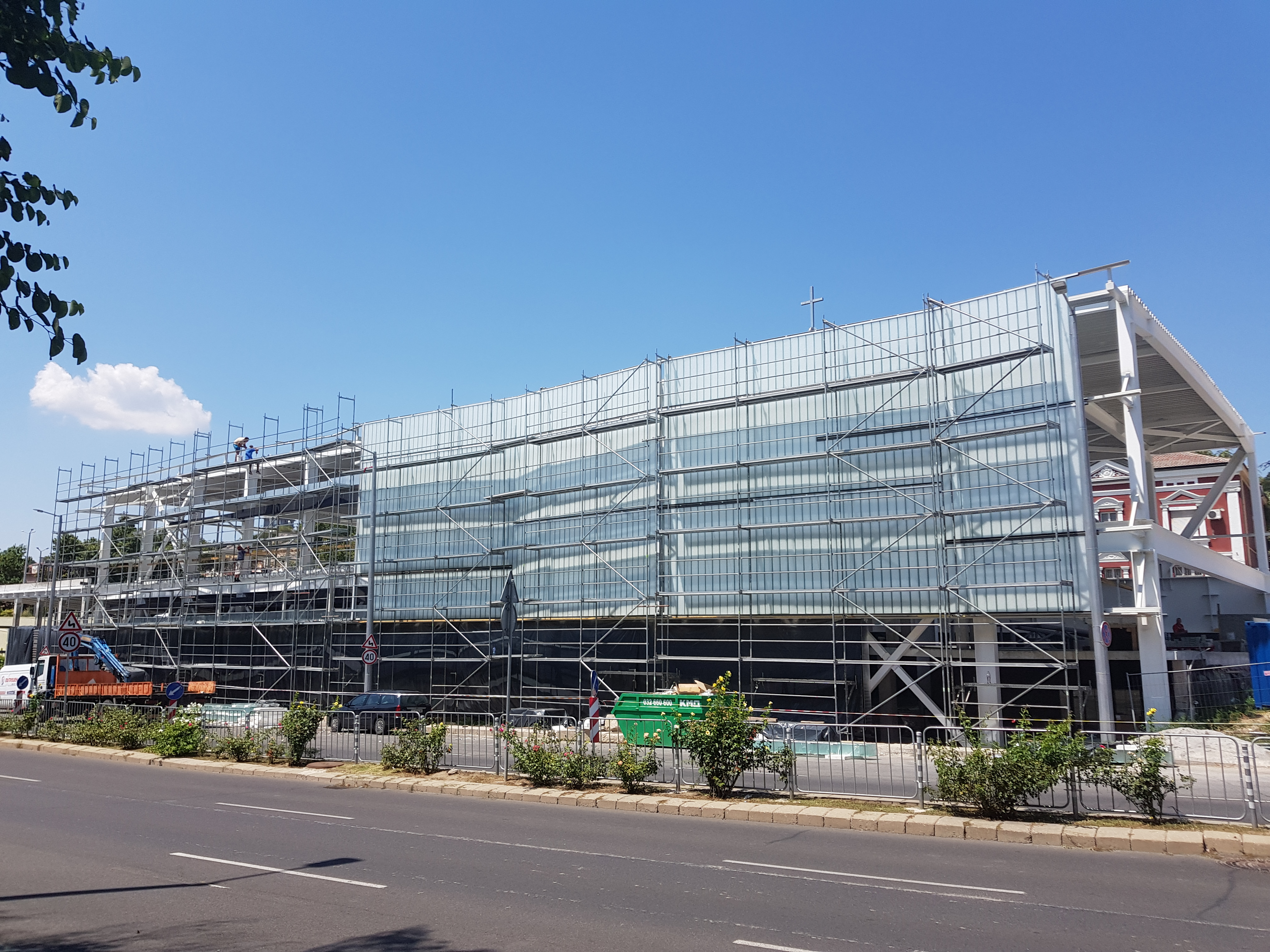

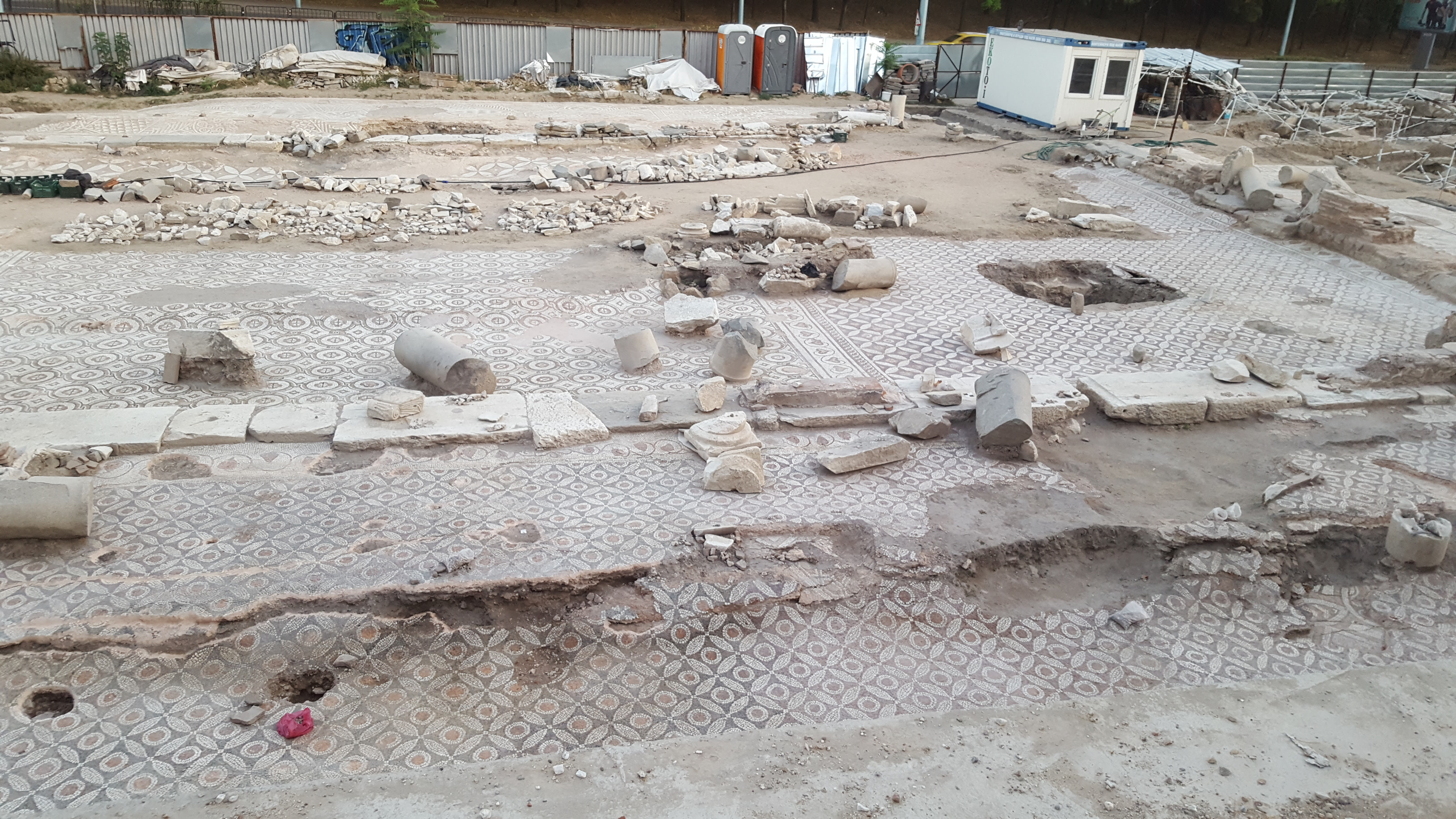

== Bibliography ==
- Topalilov, Ivo (2024). "Die Metropolitenbasilika des spätantiken Philippopolis/Plovdiv, Thrakien (Bulgarien)" [The metropolitan basilica of late antique Philippopolis/Plovdiv, Thrace (Bulgaria)]. In: Mitteilungen zur christlichen Archäologie 30, pp. 9–38.
