= Danov =

Danov, feminine: Danova is a Bulgarian surname.

- Georgi Danov, (born 1990), Bulgarian footballer
- Hristo G. Danov (1828–1911), Bulgarian publisher and printer
- Miroslav Danov (born 1979), Bulgarian bobsledder
- Peter Danov (1864–1944), Bulgarian philosopher and esoteric Christian
- Sofia Danova (1879–1946), Bulgarian philanthropist, educator and publisher.
