= Anastasia Zhelyazkova =

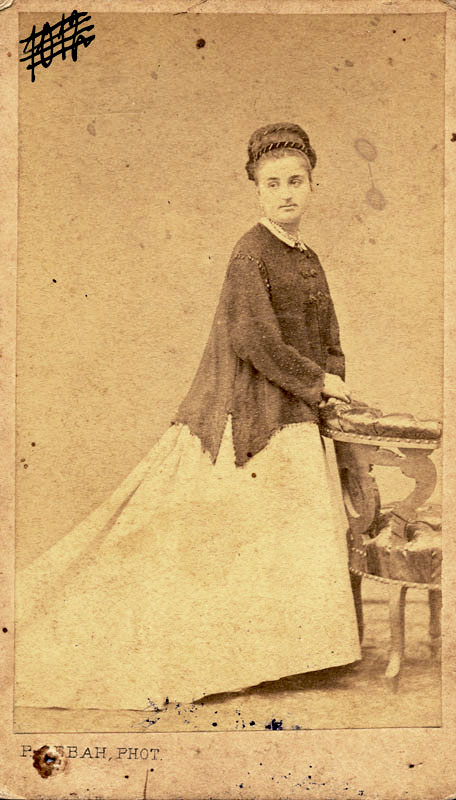
Photograph of Anastasia Zhelyazkova

Anastasia Zhelyazkova (Bulgarian: Анастасия Желязкова, née Uzunova (Узунова) 1845–1931), was a Bulgarian activist, benefactor, teacher, esotericist, and a translator from French.

== Life ==
Zhelyazkova was born Anastasia Tsvyatkova Uzunova into the family of Tsvyatko Uzunov, an aristocrat from Koprivshtitsa. She studied in a Greek and French school in Constantinople. In 1869 she worked as a teacher in Kalofer and from 1871 until 1876, in Plovdiv. In 1879 she collaborated with the newspaper Century (Bulgarian: Век) and wrote Primer of the French language (Bulgarian: Буквар на френския език), published by Hristo G. Danov. In Plovdiv she met a doctor from Vidin, Dr. Mladen Zhelyazkov, and married him. When the Russo-Turkish War was declared, they fled to Russia, where she continued to advocate for the Bulgarian cause. After the Liberation, they settled down in Vidin, where she founded the Women's Society. After great family misfortunes, the loss of several children, they left the town. In 1890 her husband was appointed the city doctor of Varna; their home was on Stefan Karadzha Street. They had two children.

Zhelyazkova became a member of the Women's Charitable Cultural and Education Society, 'Mother' (Майка), established in Varna in 1888. After a while she was elected chairwoman (from 1892 until 1897; and in 1900). In 1897 'Mother' opened the first vocational school in Varna, called 'Labour'. During this period she made numerous translations from French, of which only one is preserved today.

Zhelyazkova was one of the first pupils of philosopher and spiritual teacher Peter Dunoff. She studied spiritualist and theosophical literature and translated from French books by Camille Flammarion and Charles W. Leadbeater. She wrote short spiritual articles, published in the magazine New Light (Bulgarian: Нова светлина).

A person who combined charity, mysticism, and public courage in a unique way, Peter Dunoff wrote about her: 'Our sister wants to please both the world and God; serve both the One and the other'.

She died in 1931 in Varna.
