= Hristo G. Danov =

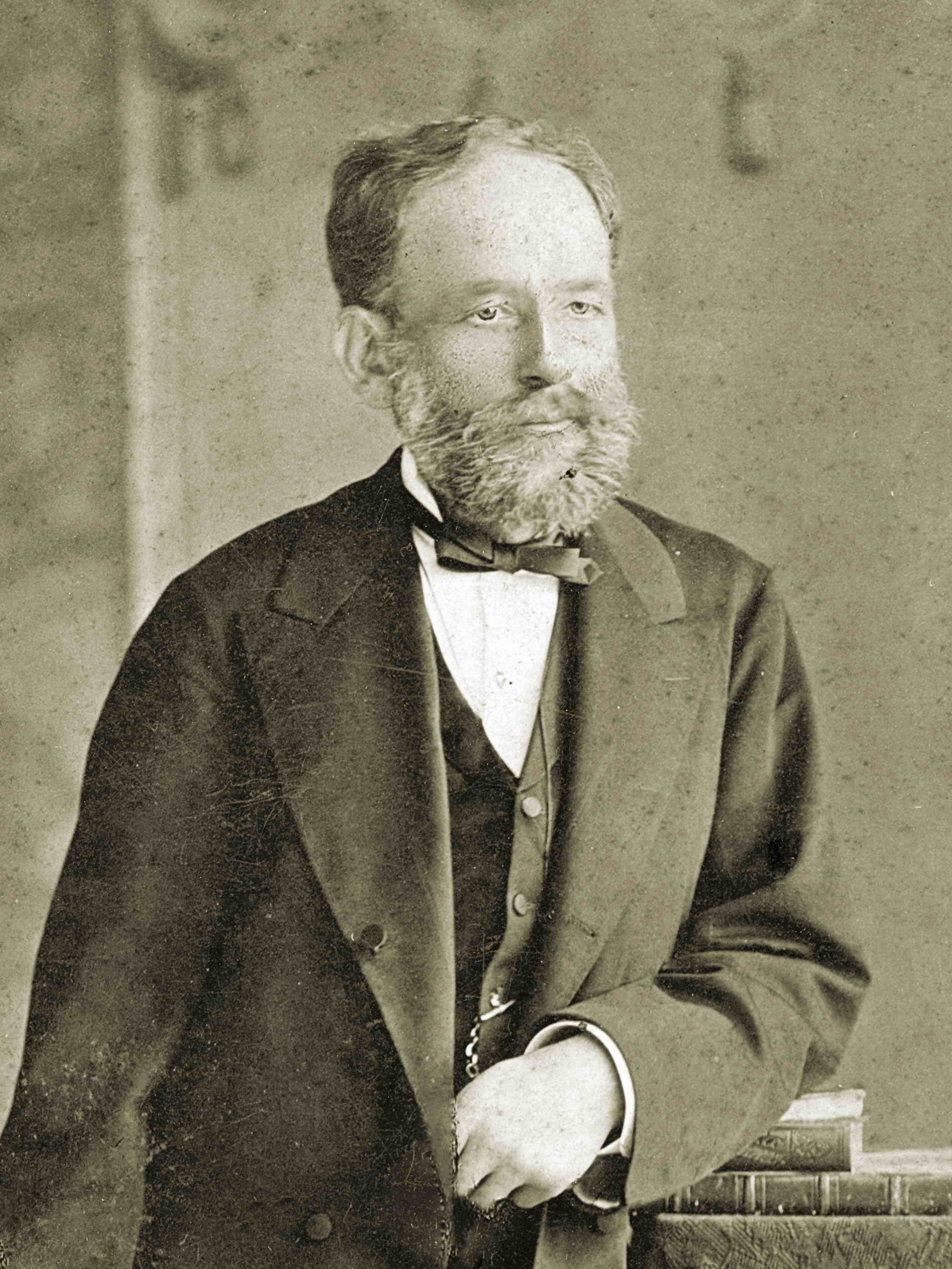
- Born: August 27, 1828; Klisura, Ottoman Empire
- Died: November 12, 1911 (aged 83)
- Resting place: Church of the Holy Mother of God, Plovdiv; 42°8′52.12″N 24°45′2.31″E
- Occupations: publisher, teacher

Hristo Gruev Danov (Bulgarian: Христо Груев Данов; 27 August 1828 – 11 December 1911) was a Bulgarian enlightener, teacher and book publisher of the Bulgarian National Revival who is regarded as the father of organized book publishing in the Bulgarian lands and hailed as the "Bulgarian Gutenberg". After the Liberation of Bulgaria in 1878, he was also a politician and mayor of Plovdiv.

== Biography ==
Danov was born in Klisura, a town in Ottoman Rumelia (today in central Bulgaria), to the family of a frieze waver. He commenced his education at the Klisura religious school before moving to the class school in Panagyurishte opened by Sava Radulov, where he studied in 1841–1842. However, his father's death meant Danov had to return to Klisura and become a craftsman so as to sustain the family. In 1847, he again enrolled at the Panagyurishte school, and in 1848–1850 he was a student at Nayden Gerov's school in Koprivshtitsa. Having completed his education, Hristo Danov became a teacher in Strelcha (1851–1852) and Perushtitsa (1852–1853). During the Crimean War (1853–1856) he was a teacher in Plovdiv.

In 1856, Danov returned to Klisura, where he established the town's first modern class school. Danov's work as a publisher began in Belgrade, the capital of the Principality of Serbia, where he printed the calendar Balkan Mountain Boy. Calendar for the 1856 Leap Year. Together with the teacher Yacho (Yoakim) Truvchev and the bookbinder Nyagul Boyadzhiyski, he founded the bindery Druzhestvena knigoveznitsa (Дружествена книговезница) in 1857 in Plovdiv. The bindery would gradually grow to become a bookshop and then emerge as the first Bulgarian publishing house. By 1862, the company had evolved into the Hristo G. Danov & Co. Publishing House, and Yoakim Gruev had joined as a partner. In 1862, the Hristo G. Danov & Co. Publishing House had branches in Ruse and Veles. In 1874, Danov's publishing house opened its own printing office in Vienna, the Austro–Hungarian capital.

As a publisher, Danov contributed greatly to the development of Bulgarian education in the Bulgarian National Revival period. His publishing house issued Neofit Rilski's mutual instruction graphs, textbooks and geographic maps for the school curriculum, as well as the first Bulgarian large-scale wall maps. Other books published by Danov included individual works by Euripides, Ivan Turgenev, Guy de Maupassant and Jules Verne.

In 1876, in the wake of the major anti-Ottoman April Uprising organized by the Bulgarian population, Danov was imprisoned for three months in Plovdiv. Once released, he moved to Svishtov, where he was based for most of the Russo-Turkish War (1877–1878). As the war led to Bulgaria's liberation, Danov had his printing office moved from Vienna to Plovdiv (which in 1878 became the capital of autonomous Eastern Rumelia, which united with the Principality of Bulgaria in 1885). From 1878 to 1885 he issued the Maritsa newspaper, the first all-Bulgarian newspaper, which was supported by vice-governor Todor Burmov and the interim Russian government. In 1880, the publishing house expanded with branches in Lom and Sofia. Danov himself became an associate member of the Bulgarian Literary Society (today the Bulgarian Academy of Sciences) in 1881, and an honorary member in 1900.

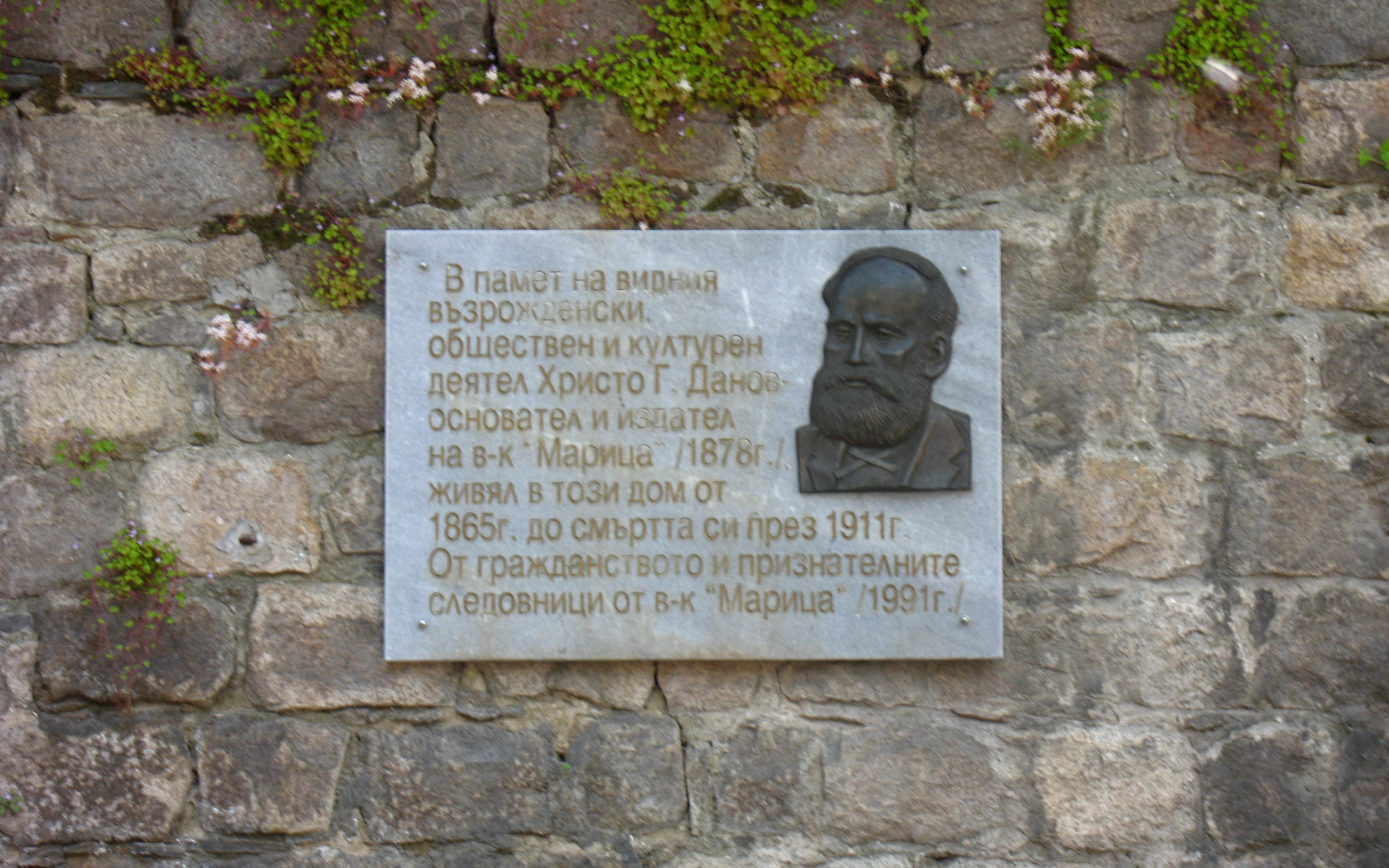
Memorial plaque dedicated to Hristo G. Danov in Plovdiv

Danov began his political career as a member of the Eastern Rumelia Regional Assembly in 1882. Between 1 February 1897 and 2 July 1899, he was mayor of Plovdiv, for which he asked to receive no salary. It was during his term that the first town plan of Plovdiv was designed by Josef Schnitter. Another of Danov's accomplishments as a mayor was the afforestation of two of Plovdiv's seven hills. Danov died in 1911 and was interred at the Church of the Holy Mother of God in Plovdiv. Among Hristo G. Danov's descendants are several prominent Bulgarians, including historian Hristo M. Danov (1908–1997) and lawyer Hristo Danov (1922–2003). His daughter-in-law, Sofia Danova (1879–1946), was the first Bulgarian woman to obtain a mathematics degree.

Danov's House in Plovdiv's Old Town is home to one of the Plovdiv Regional Historical Museum's expositions, dedicated to the history of Bulgarian publishing. The house dates to the mid-19th century.

Danov's namesake award was established in 1999 and is presented annually by the Bulgarian Ministry of Culture and the Plovdiv National Book Center to recognize those who make contributions to Bulgarian literary culture.
