= Dimitar Mantov =

Bulgarian novelist (1930–2008)

Dimitar Stefanov Mantov (13 October 1930 – 28 July 2008) was a Bulgarian historical novelist.

== Biography ==
Dimitar Stefanov Mantov was born on 13 October 1930 in the village of Bosilkovtsi, Ruse region in a family of teachers. He received his primary education in his native village, graduated from high school in the town of Polski Trambesh. As a student he edited the youth literary magazines "Young Creator" (1945–1946) in Polski Trambesh and "Spring" (1947).

Mantov graduated from Sofia University and initially worked as lawyer, and later as journalist and editor at Narodna Mladezh Publishing House and at the Center for Literary Information. He was author of the scripts for the documentaries "Old Manuscripts", "Balkan War", "Aleko Konstantinov" as well as author of mostly historical novels and several adventure novels. He died on 28 July 2008, at the age of 77.

== Bibliography ==
=== Novels ===
- Kaloyan, King of the Bulgarians (1958)
- Ivan Asen, Tsar and Autocrat (1960)
- The Stone Nest (1966)
- The Great Day (1966)
- Bandit's Blood (1969)
- Evil Land (1970)
- The Devil's Carousel (1971)
- Crazy Heads (1972)
- Khan Krum (1973)
- Yuvigi Khan Omurtag (1974)
- The Toothed Sun (1975)
- Red Calendar (1976)
- The Auls of Khan Omurtag (1976)
- The Albigensian Legend (1977)
- Prince Boris I (1978)
- Carpetrovo time (1981)
- The Hawk (1981)
- Sign on a stone (1982)
- The Winds Leave Traces (1982)
- The Great March (1983)
- South Bulgarian Chronicle (1985)
- Haydut Velko (1985)
- Via Mala (1985)
- The Wolf Bridge (1987)
- Haiduti walking on the sea (1988)
- The Day of Redemption (1988)
- Troubled Year (1990)
- Abagar and the Witches (1999)
- Night in Kabyle (2000)
- The invisible rope (2002)

=== Romanized biographies ===
- The Lucky Man (for Aleko Konstantinov) (1963)
- Pencho Slaveykov (The Last Days of the Poet) (1969)
- The Patriot (Hristo G. Danov) (1969)

=== Stories ===
- The Price of Silence (1962)
- The Steps of Hope (1971)

=== Historical essays ===
- Horse to Horse, Young Man to Young Man (1962)
- Wind echoes, Balkan moans (1963)
- Old Capital Cities (1973)

Mantov also wrote historical essays from the Father's Hearth Library - "Svishtov" (1962), "Elena" (1964), "Lyaskovets" (1965) and "Nessebar" (1965), Bulgarian cuisine receipts in "Bulgarian Cuisine", as well as the children's book - "Tales for Holidays" (2005).
