= Danova =

Danova can refer to:

== People ==
- Danova, feminine form of the Bulgarian surname Danov
- Italian surname
  - Cesare Danova, Italian-born actor
  - Giancarlo Danova, Italian footballer
  - Luigi Danova, Italian footballer
  - Roberto Danova, music composer, arranger and producer

== Other ==
- The Latin name of the ancient (now titular) episcopal see of Danaba
- Ďanová, a village in Slovakia
