= Bloodletter =

Bloodletter or Blood Letter may refer to:

- Bloodletting, using leeches
- "Bloodletter", song by Saxon from Unleash the Beast 1997
- Bloodletter, Star Trek Deep Space Nine novel by K. W. Jeter
- Blood Letter (film), Vietnamese film
- The Bloody Letter (Bulgarian: Кърваво писмо), letter by Bulgarian revolutionary Todor Kableshkov, anti-Ottoman April Uprising of 1876
