= Josef Schnitter =

Czech-Bulgarian architect (1852–1914)

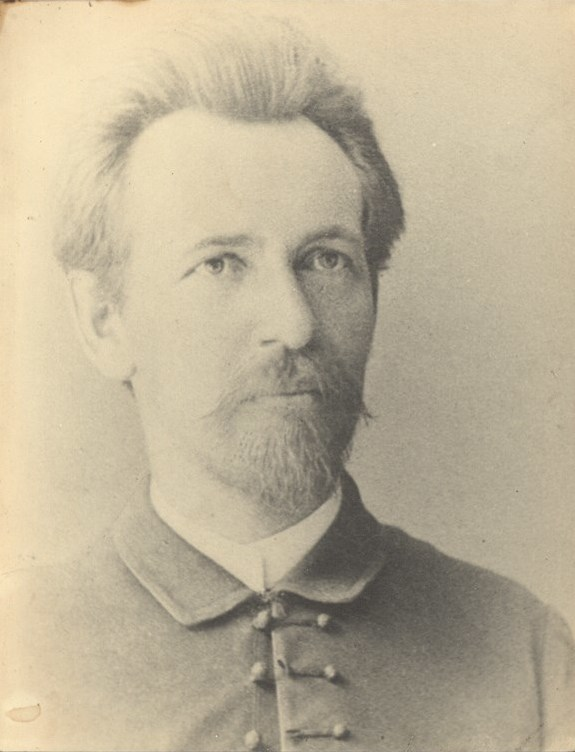
Josef Schnitter in 1900

Josef Schnitter (Bulgarian: Йосиф Шнитер, Yosif Shniter; 16 October 1852 – 26 April 1914) was a Czech-Bulgarian architect, engineer and geodesist. He is credited with shaping the modern appearance of Plovdiv, Bulgaria's second-largest city.

== Biography ==
Schnitter was born on 16 October 1852 in Nový Bydžov in Bohemia, Austrian Empire (today in the Czech Republic). He graduated from the University of Technology's Faculty of Construction in the imperial capital Vienna and then moved to the Russian Empire, where he converted to the Eastern Orthodox Church. Schnitter arrived in Bulgaria during the Russo-Turkish War of 1877–1878 and assisted the Imperial Russian Army as an engineer, designing the pontoon bridges used in the crossing of the Danube and the fortification equipment employed by the Russians in the Siege of Plevna. Schnitter was injured at Pleven and received a sabre from General Eduard Totleben, who commanded the siege, as a recognition of his contribution to the siege's success.

Even before the Treaty of San Stefano was signed on 3 March 1878 and Bulgaria was liberated from Ottoman rule, Schnitter was dispatched to Plovdiv by the Russians. He settled in the city, which was the capital of autonomous Eastern Rumelia until the Unification of Bulgaria in 1885, and, after a brief private practice, served as Plovdiv's head architect and municipal chief of engineering from 1878 until his death in 1914.

Schnitter was married to Elisabeth Maria Friederike Baumann from Windsheim in Germany who was staying in Plovdiv's Old Town en route to Istanbul. According to the story, he met his future wife when the crumbs she threw out of her window landed on Schnitter, who was touring the buildings he had constructed. His best man was Slovene scholar Anton Bezenšek who spent two decades teaching in Plovdiv. The architect acquired Bulgarian citizenship in 1906. Josef Schnitter died of bronchopneumonia in 1914; he got sick while overseeing the repair of the city water conduit. He was interred in the Plovdiv Central Cemetery.

Maria Schnitter, head of the Plovdiv University's Faculty of Philosophy and History, is his great-granddaughter. In 2006, Josef Schnitter was posthumously declared an honorary citizen of Plovdiv and in early 2009, plans were announced to erect a monument to the architect in the city; the monument will be sculptured by Tsvyatko Siromashki. A street in Plovdiv is also named after the architect.

== Works ==
Schnitter designed Plovdiv's entire post-Liberation city plan (1888–1891), including its main street, today's Prince Alexander Street, which he intended to be 54 metres (177 ft) wide. However, he was persuaded by the City Council to narrow it to 16 metres (52 ft).

His other projects include:

- bell tower of Saint Demetrius' Church
- bell tower of Saint Petka's Church
- bell tower of the Holy Mother of God Church (1880–1881)
- Saint George's Church (1881–1883)
- Saints Cyril and Methodius' Church (1882–1884)
- the new church in Batak
- the current Neo-Renaissance City Art Gallery building (former Main Girls' School, 1879–1881)
- the current Museum of Natural History building (former Plovdiv municipality building, 1880)
- the house where writer Ivan Vazov lived
- Yoakim Gruev's house
- Dragan Manchov's house (1887)
- Sveshtarovi brothers' house (1888)
- Ivan Gerdzhikov's house (1890)
- Ivan Andonov's house (1891)
- Orozdi Bak commercial house building (1896–1897)
- Metropol Hotel
- Konstantin Naydenovich's house (1905–1906)
- Plovdiv municipality engineering department building

== Gallery ==
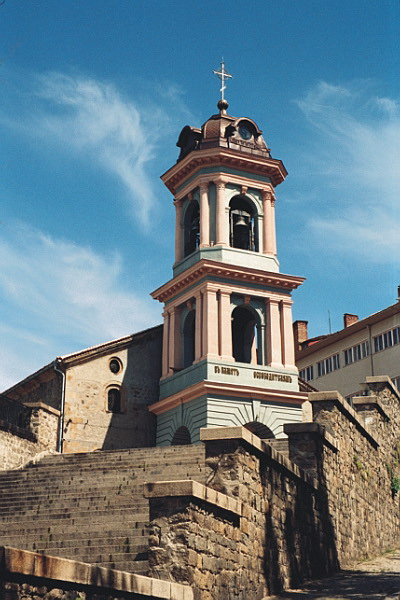
Bell tower of the Holy Mother of God Church

City Art Gallery building

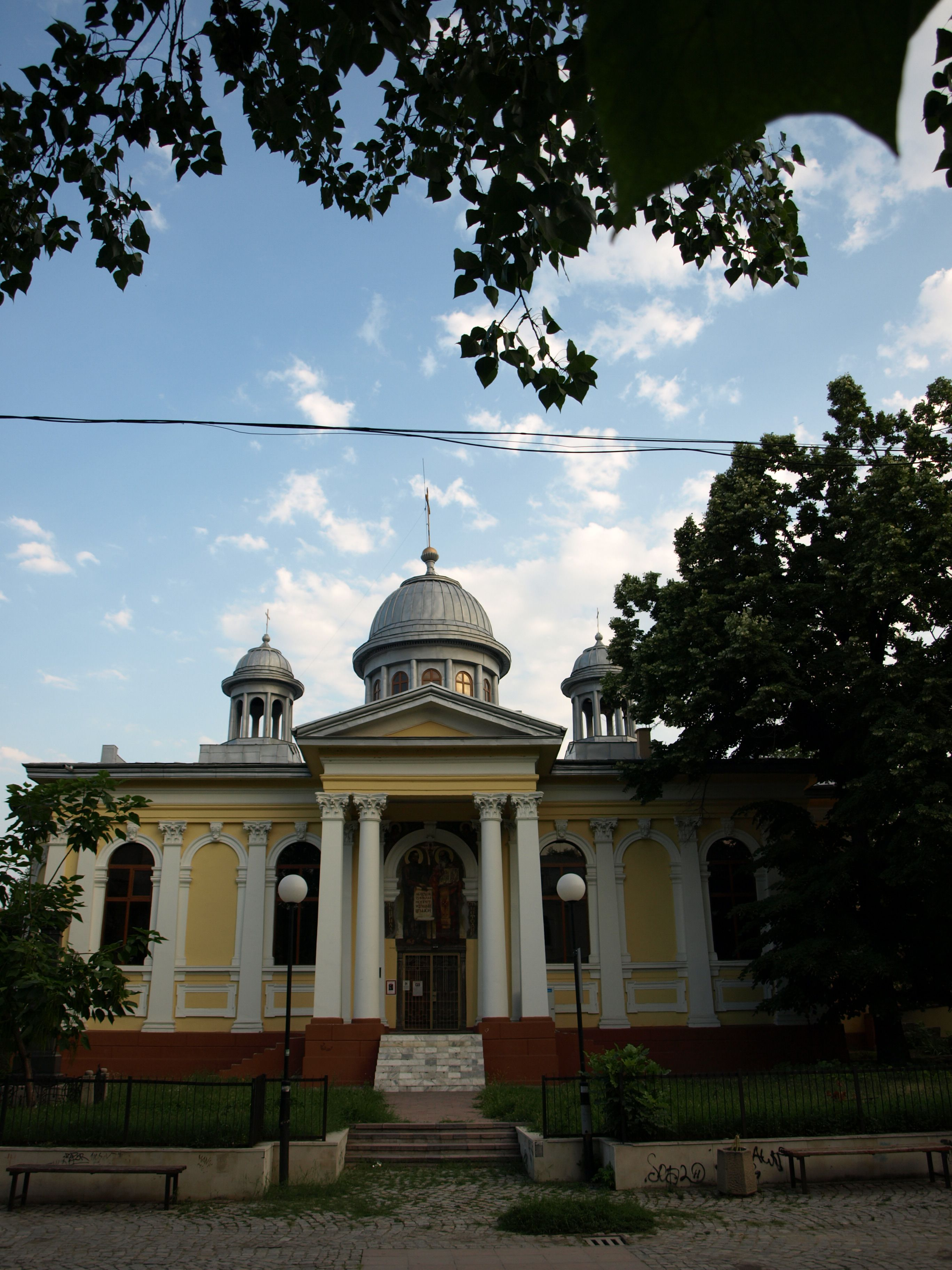
Saints Cyril and Methodius' Church

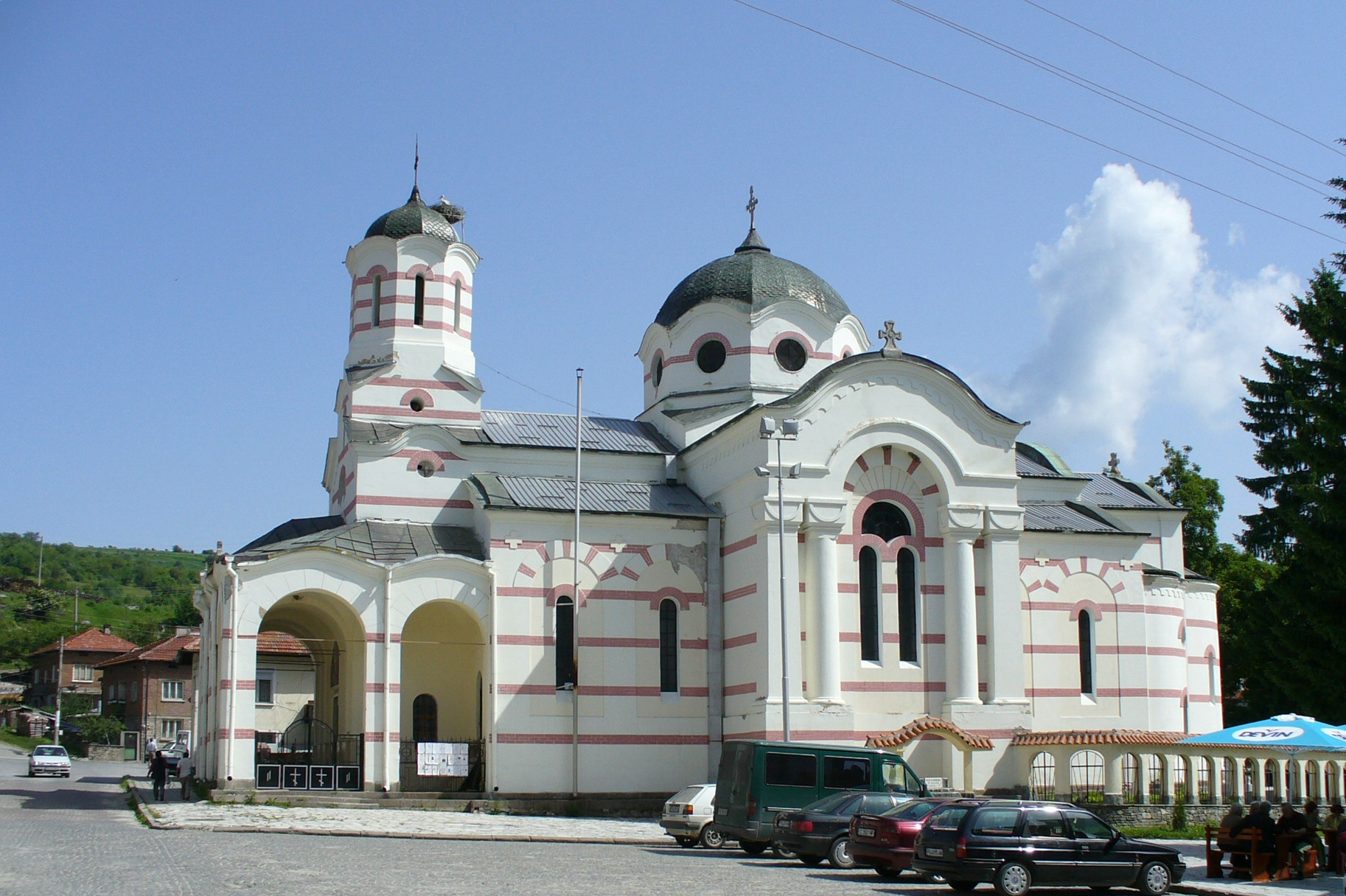
The new church in Batak

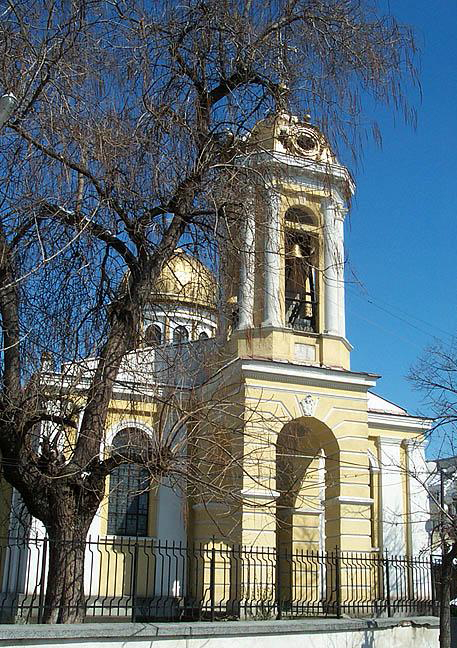
Saint George's Church in Plovdiv

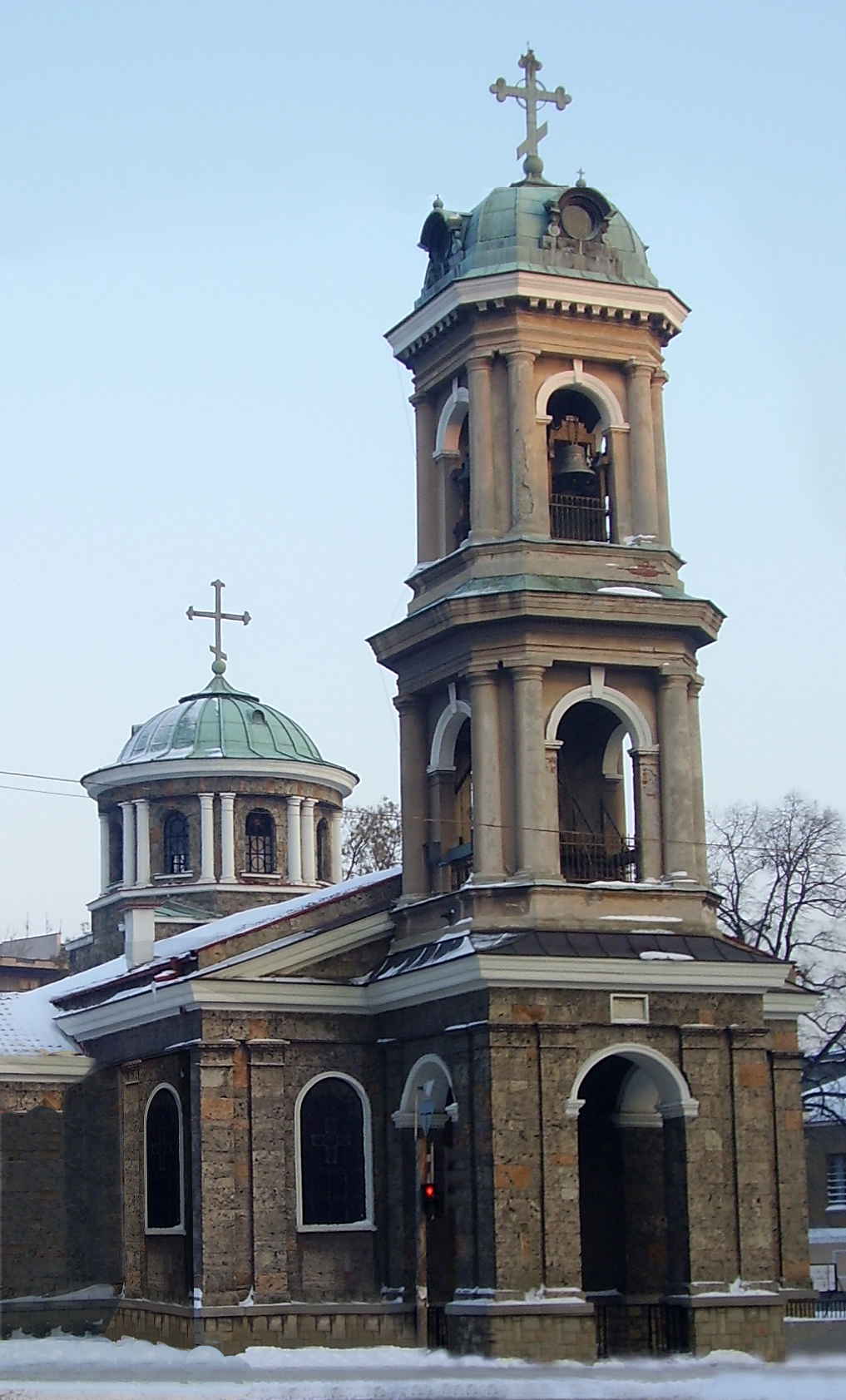
Saint Petka's church in Plovdiv
