= Bloody Letter =

Letter written by Bulgarian revolutionary Todor Kableshkov

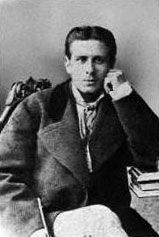
Todor Kableshkov, author

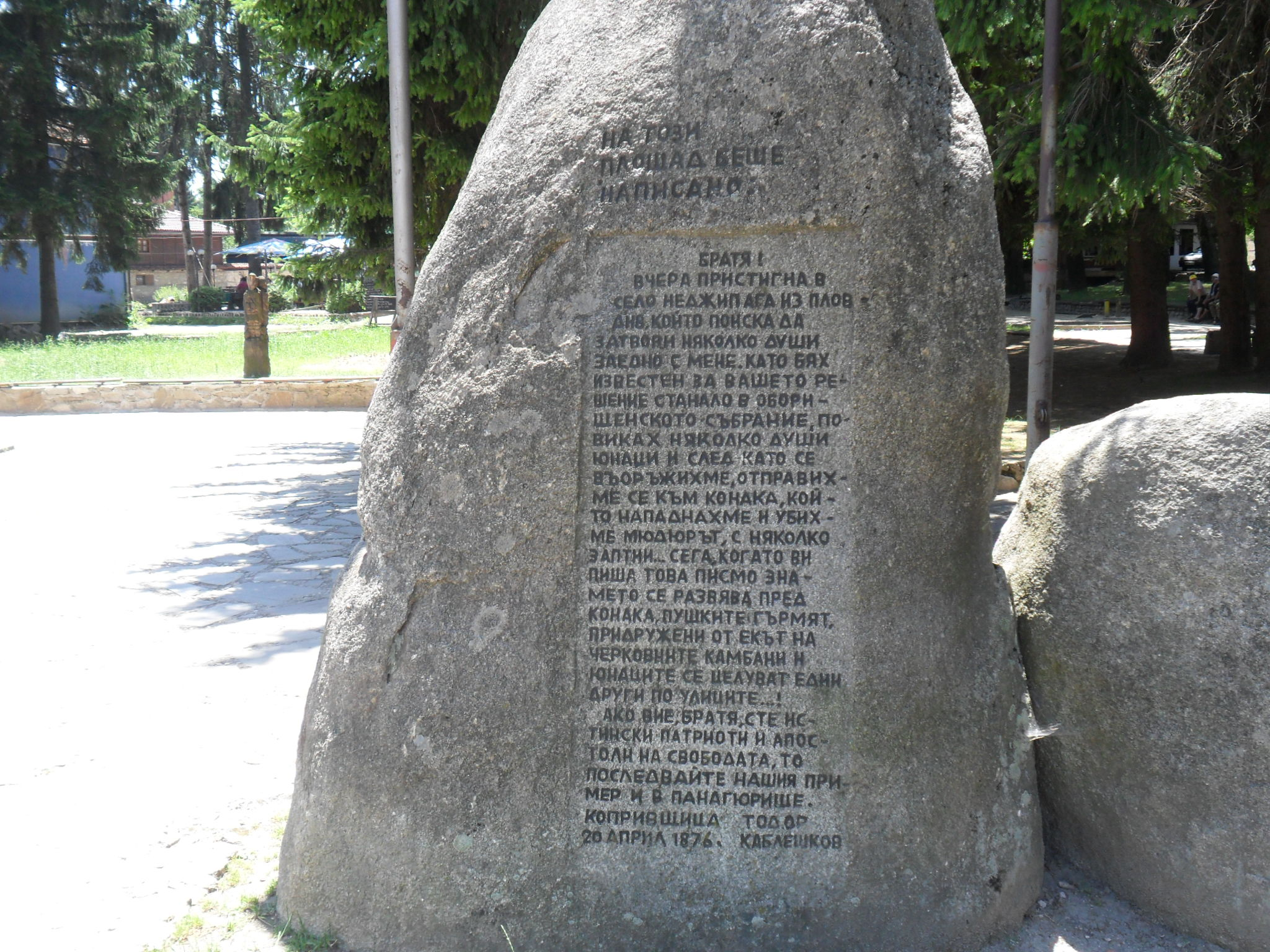
A monument to the letter in Koprivshtitsa, near its place of writing.

The Bloody Letter (Bulgarian: Кърваво писмо) is a letter written by Bulgarian revolutionary Todor Kableshkov which is symbolically accepted to be the start of the anti-Ottoman April Uprising of 1876.

Kableshkov writes this letter upon proclaiming the revolt in his home city of Koprivshtitsa and addresses it to the revolutionary committee of Panagyurishte and specifically to Georgi Benkovski. The letter's name comes from the fact that it is signed with the blood of a local Ottoman governor (müdür), shortly after he was killed by revolutionary Georgi Tihanek. It was transported by 19-year-old Georgi Salchev for a record time of 2 hours, having his horse passing out just before reaching Panagyurishte because of the strain.

According to Memoirs of the Bulgarian Uprisings by Zahari Stoyanov, the letter's contents were:

Brothers!

Yesterday Neceb Aga arrived in our village from Plovdiv, and asked to imprison some people, including me. When I heard about your decision, made at the Council of Oborishte, I called up some brave men and after we got armed, we headed towards the konak and attacked it, killing the müdür and some policemen... Now, as I am writing this letter, the flag is waving before the konak, rifles shoot and the church bells echo simultaneously with them, men are kissing one another on the streets... If you, brothers, happen to be true patriots and apostles of Freedom, then do follow our example in Panagyurishte...

Koprivshtitsa, 20th April (old style) 1876 T. Kableshkov

I was witness as all events mentioned above in Todor's letter happened. Leaving for Klisura, to do the same.

N. Karadzhov

== See also ==
- National awakening of Bulgaria
- Ottoman rule of Bulgaria
