= Todor Kableshkov =

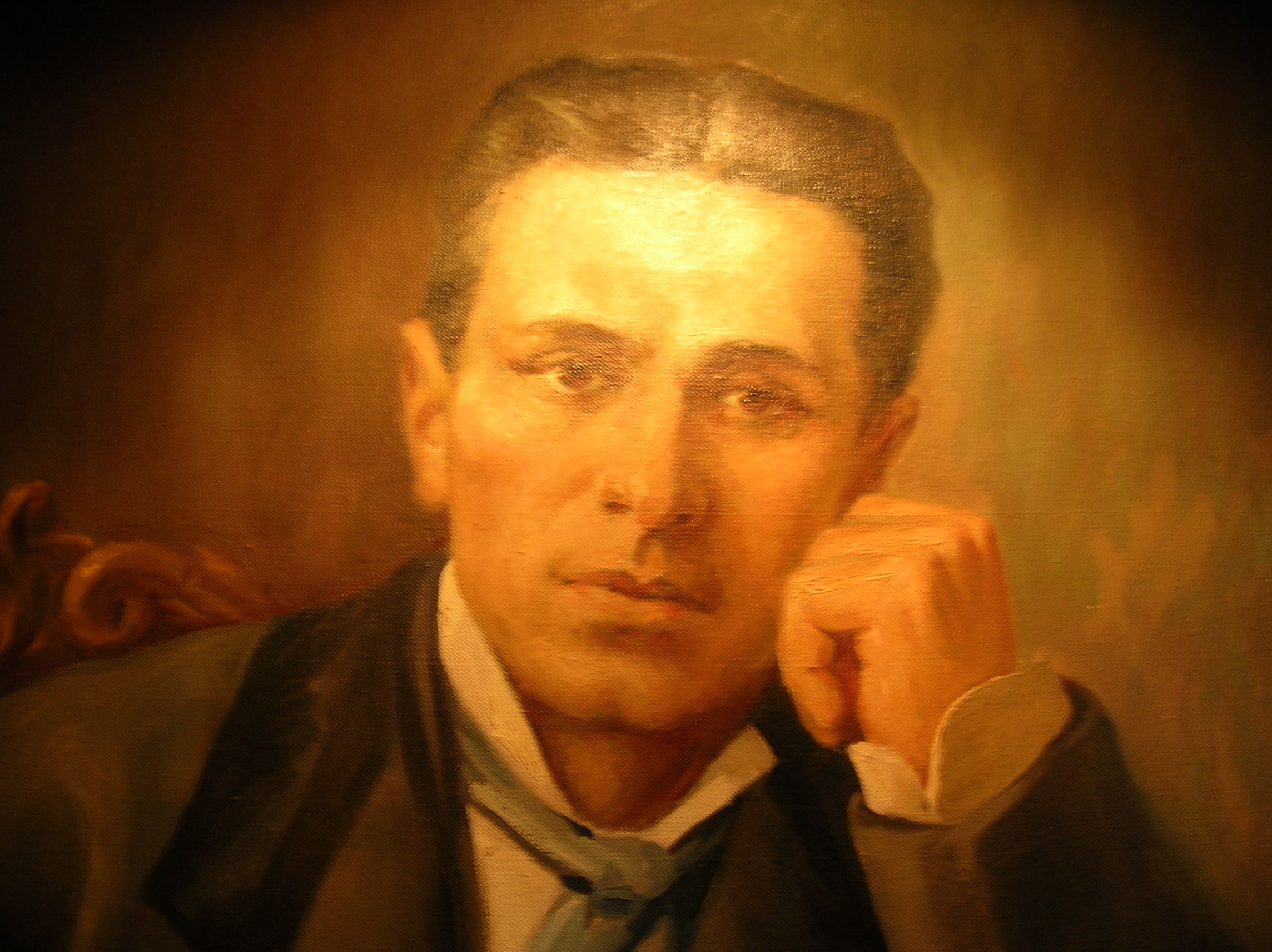
- Bulgarian revolutionary
- Born: 13 January 1851; Koprivshtitsa, Ottoman Empire
- Died: 16 June 1876 (aged 25); Gabrovo, Ottoman Empire

Todor Kableshkov (Bulgarian: Тодор Каблешков) (13 January 1851 – 16 June 1876) was a 19th-century Bulgarian revolutionary and one of the leaders of the April Uprising.

Born in Koprivshtitsa in a wealthy family, he studied in his hometown and then in Plovdiv between 1864 and 1867 and founded the Zora enlightenment society in 1867. He continued his education in Galatasaray High School in Istanbul, but was forced to return to Koprivshtitsa because of illness. He worked in Edirne as a telegraph operator in 1873 and was then a station master near Pazardzhik, where he engaged in cultural and educational activities.

Kableshkov returned to Koprvishtitsa in the beginning of 1876 and committed himself to revolutionary work. He was assigned the head of the local revolutionary committee in Koprishtitsa and deputy-apostle of the Panagyurishte revolutionary district. He was the first to proclaim the April Uprising on 20 April 1876 and is the author of the famous Bloody Letter to the Panagyurishte revolutionary district. Kableshkov was the head of the military council in Koprivshtitsa and led a cheta (band, detachment) together with Panayot Volov, with which he went round the nearby villages.

After the uprising was suppressed by the Ottoman authorities, Kableshkov fled in the interior of Stara Planina with a small group. He was captured near Troyan and was afterwards tortured in the Lovech and Veliko Tarnovo prisons. Todor Kableshkov eventually committed suicide in the Gabrovo police office at the age of 25.

Todor Kableshkov is remembered as one of the most courageous Bulgarian revolutionaries especially considering the young age at which he entered the revolutionary movement. His home house in Koprivshtitsa is now turned into a museum and a monument was built on the place he decided to start the rebellion.
