= Church of the Holy Mother of God, Plovdiv =

Church in Plovdiv, Bulgaria

Coordinates: 42°8′52.12″N 24°45′2.31″E

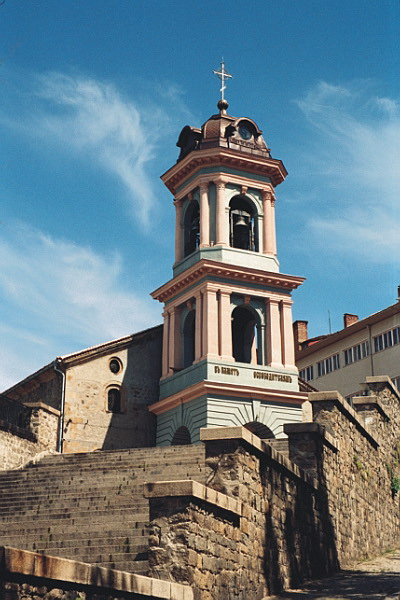
The Church of the Holy Mother of God.

The Church of the Holy Mother of God, officially the Cathedral Church of the Dormition of the Holy Mother of God (Bulgarian: Църква Света Богородица, Катедрален храм "Успение Богородично") is a Bulgarian National Revival church in Bulgaria's second largest city Plovdiv. The church is situated in the Old town of Plovdiv on one of the city's seven hills, Nebet Tepe.

A small church existed on the site as early as the 9th century. The church was renovated in 1186 by the bishop of Plovdiv Constantine Pantehi and it became part of a monastery. Both the church and the monastery were destroyed when the Ottoman Turks conquered the city in 1371 in the course of the Bulgarian-Ottoman Wars.

The current edifice was constructed in 1844 as the main church of the city. It was a large three-nave pseudo-basilica built by craftsmen from Bratsigovo, and the first benefactors (ktitors) were wealthy merchants from the town of Koprivshtitsa, the Chalukov brothers - Vulko and Stoyan Teodorovich Chalukovi. The iconostasis was made by carvers from Bulgarian School of Debar. Most of the church's icons were created by the painter Nikola of Odrin.

On 25 December 1859 and again on 10 January 1860, the bishop of Plovdiv Paisius held a service in the Bulgarian language and publicly announced that his congregation denounced the Greek Patriarch of Istanbul which became a great scandal and Plovdiv became the most radical center for the struggle of the autonomy of the Bulgarian Orthodox Church. On 30 April, Paisius organized a Church and People's counsel in which the citizens were also represented in order to discuss the church question. Plovdiv sent a delegation to the Ottoman government asking officially for an autonomous Church. That Counsel was held annually until 1870 when the Bulgarian Exarchate was recognized by the Ottomans.

In 1881, three years after the Liberation of Bulgaria, the architect Josef Schnitter constructed a three-story domed belfry near the western entrance of the church. On the belfry, there is an inscription which reads "In memory of the liberators" as gratitude of the citizens to the Russian soldiers who liberated the city on 4 January 1878.
