= Dimcho Debelyanov =

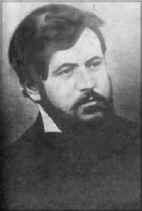
- Born: 28 March 1887; Koprivshtitsa, Principality of Bulgaria (now Bulgaria)
- Died: 2 October 1916 (aged 29); Gorno Karadjovo (now Monokklisia), Greece
- Resting place: Sidirokastro, Greece
- Occupations: Author and poet

Dimcho Debelyanov (Bulgarian: Димчо Дебелянов) (28 March 1887 – 2 October 1916) was a Bulgarian poet and author.

Born to a prosperous tailoring family in Koprivshtitsa, Bulgaria, Debelyanov experienced financial hardship upon the death of his father in 1896, which necessitated his family moving to Plovdiv, and then on to Sofia in 1904. Debelyanov's nostalgia for Koprivshtitsa influenced his work, often speaking of his eight years in Plovdiv with regret and calling it "the sorrowful city".

Debelyanov studied Law, history and literature at the Faculties of Law and History and Philosophy at Sofia University and translated works in both French and English. In 1906, Debelyanov began sending poetry to Bulgarian literary magazines at the urging of friend and fellow poet Pencho Slaveikov, which were accepted and well received.

His poems at this time were satirical, with symbolist qualities and subjects, such as dreams, idealism and the stylising of medieval legends.

Debelyanov worked several odd jobs during the next six years, finding employment as a junior clerk for the central meteorological station, a translator and a freelance journalist, before being mobilised in 1912 into the Balkan army during Balkan Wars, where he was discharged in 1914. Though he considered himself a pacifist, Debelyanov would later volunteer to join the army in 1916. Debelyanov's poetry evolved during combat, moving from idealist Symbolism to a simplified and more object focused Realism.

He was killed near Gorno Karadjovo (today Monokklisia, Greece) during a battle with an Irish division in 1916, aged 29. His body was interred in Valovishta, today Sidirokastro, Greece until 1931, when his remains were removed to his native town, Koprivshtitsa. Debelyanov's gravestone was designed by the sculptor Ivan Lazarov.

His body of work was collected by friends, then published posthumously in a two volume anthology in 1920, entitled Stihotvoreniya (Poems) with a collection of letters and personal writings. Despite his short career, Debelyanov's published poems remain popular in post-war Bulgaria.

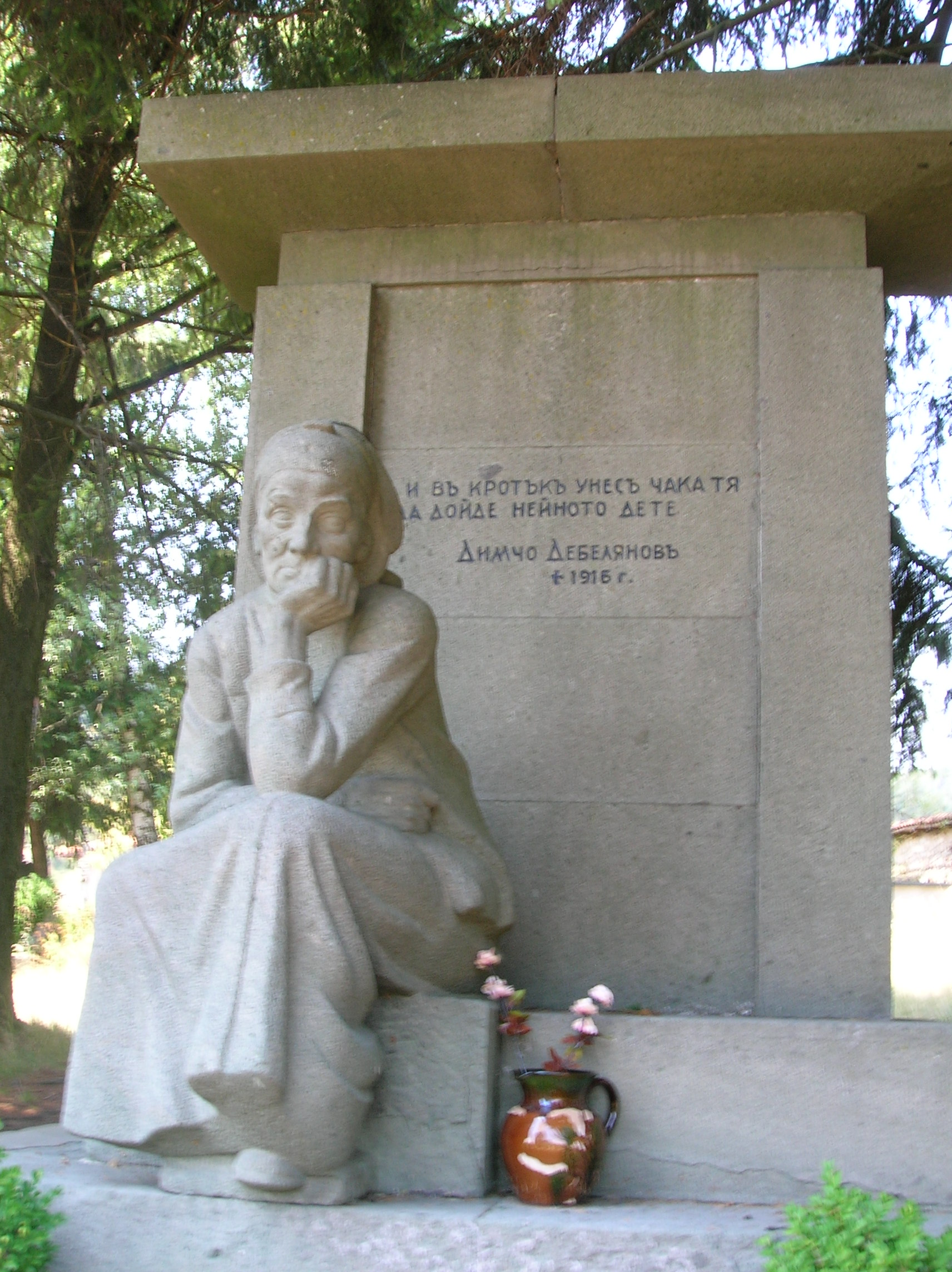
Dimcho Debelyanov's Grave with Ivan Lazarov's Sculpture of a Mother

== Honours ==
Debelyanov Point on Robert Island in Antarctica is named after Dimcho Debelyanov. His childhood home has become a museum dedicated to the poet.

== See also ==
- Symbolists
- Bulgarian Literature
- Lost Generation
