= Georgi Danov =

Bulgarian footballer

Personal information
- Full name: Georgi Hristov Danov
- Date of birth: 17 October 1990 (age 36)
- Place of birth: Plovdiv, Bulgaria
- Height: 1.82 m (6 ft 0 in)
- Position: Striker

Senior career*
Years	Team	Apps	(Gls)
2007–2008	Maritsa		
2008–2009	Loko Plovdiv	22	(1)
- * Club domestic league appearances and goals as of 1 January 2010

Georgi Danov (Bulgarian: Георги Данов) (born 17 October 1990) is a Bulgarian footballer who plays as a midfielder. His first club was Maritsa Plovdiv. Danov signed a 5-year deal with Loko Plovdiv in June 2008.
