= Sofia Danova =

Bulgarian mathematician and philanthropist

Sofia Danova (née Simeonova; born 1879 in Veliko Tarnovo; and died in 1946) was a Bulgarian philanthropist, educator and publisher. She was the first Bulgarian woman to graduate in mathematics.

== Life ==
Danova's father had been a Russian feldsher in the Russo-Turkish War (1877–1878) who settled in Bulgaria when he met his future wife. Sofia had a sister Olya. She graduated from the Metropolitan Clement Girls' High School in Veliko Tarnovo. She then went to Russia to attend the Saint Petersburg State Institute of Technology from where she obtained a degree in mathematics. Between 1904 and 1907, she taught mathematics at the Plovdiv Girls' Gymnasium. She married Gruyo Danov, a son of Hristo G. Danov, a publisher, in 1907. She also was active in the family publishing house after her father-in-law's death in 1911, along with her husband and brother-in-law. They published around 2,400 books by 1947 when the publishing house was dissolved.

She died in 1946.

== Charity ==
In 1936, Sofia headed a women's charitable foundation to support the education of poor students. The foundation, established in 1895, aimed at the economic independence of girls by training them in a vocation. A range of subjects were taught, including embroidery, tailoring, art and draughtsmanship. In 1910, the school library was set up with books donated by Hristo Danov. A fund in Sofia's name was established as well, which by 1946 had a capital of 31,690 lev. This was responsible for the welfare of poor students as well as the construction of housing.

== Bibliography ==
- Kosturkov, Yordan (24 August 2013). "Неизвестно и малко известно за Христо Г. Данов". Duma (196).
- Mitova-Ganeva, Katya (2009). Великотърновки – от традицията към модерността. Faber BG. ISBN 978-954-400-040-0.
- Stoyanova, R (2018). "Женско благотворително дружество "Постоянство"". Енциклопедия Дарителите.
