= Yoakim Gruev =

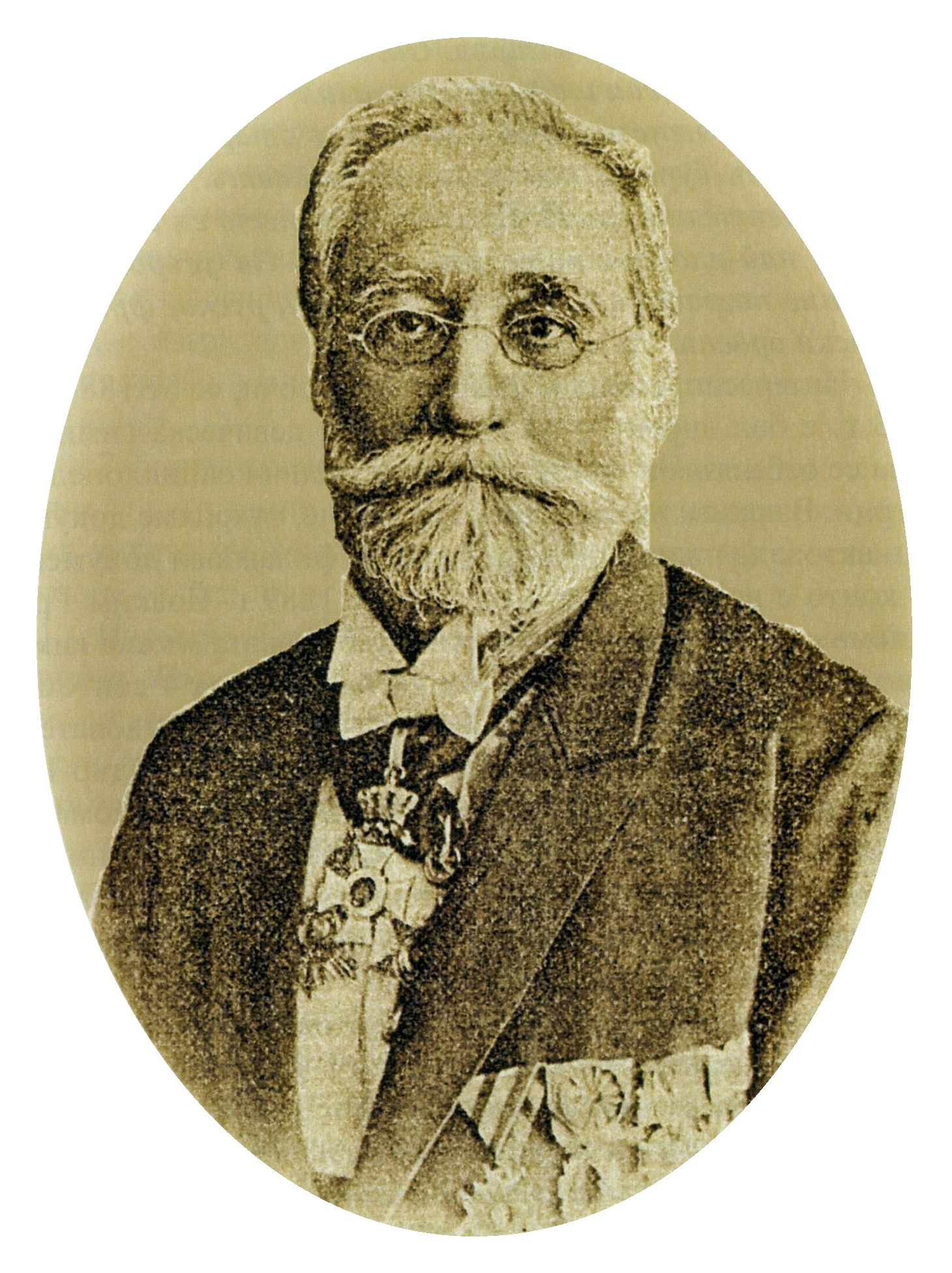
Yoakim Gruev

Joakim Gruev (Bulgarian: Йоаким Груев, died 1912) was a Bulgarian teacher and translator. He was born on 9 September 1828 in the town of Koprivshtitsa. He was a teacher at the leading Bulgarian high school in Plovdiv. He was the author of a number of textbooks.
