= Koprivshtitsa =

Town in Koprivshtitsa municipality, Sofia oblast, Bulgaria

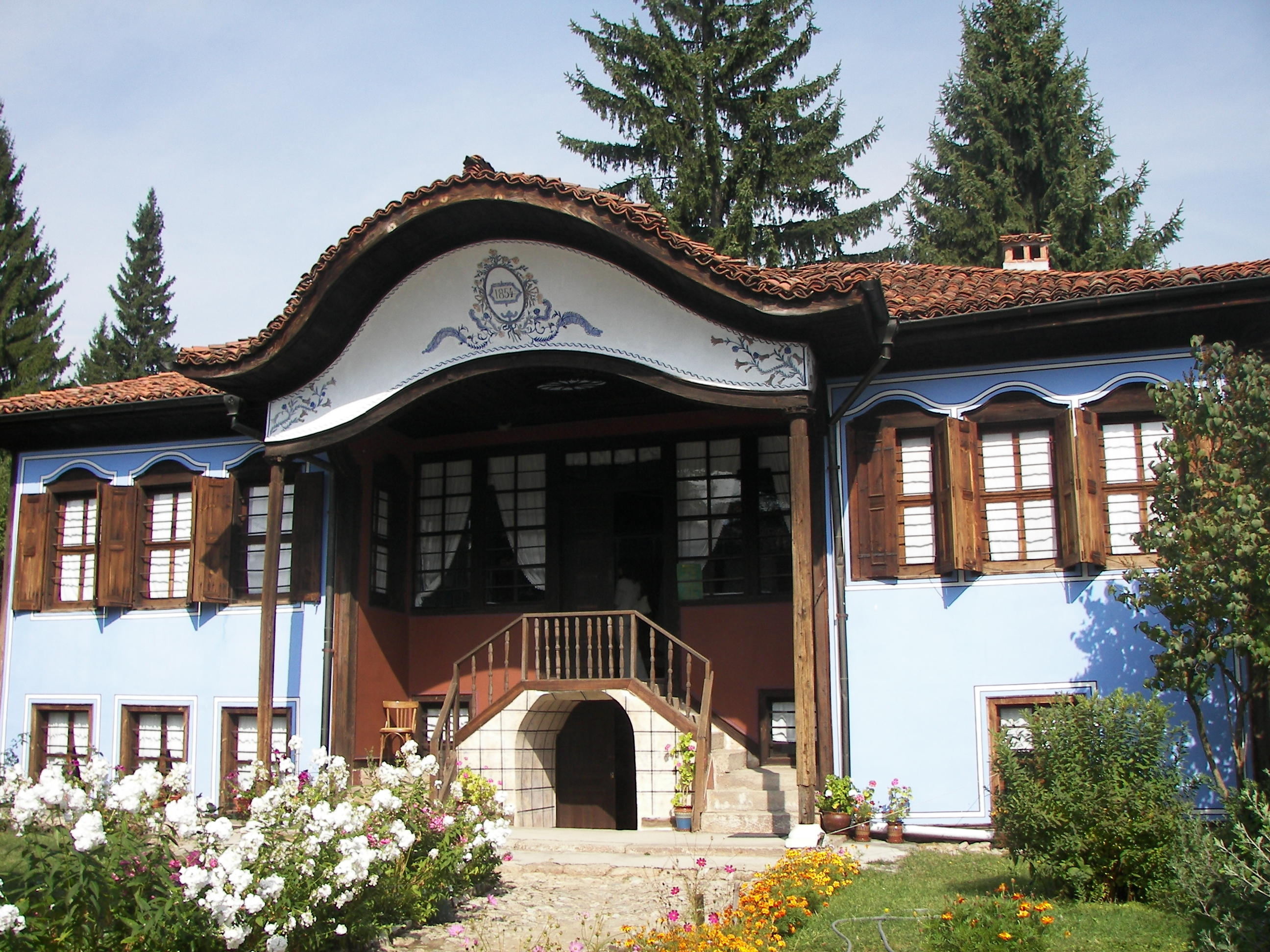
The Lyutov House, a mid-19th century house in Koprivshtitsa

Koprivshtitsa (Bulgarian: Копривщица, pronounced [koˈprifʃtit͡sɐ]], from the Bulgarian word коприва, kopriva, meaning "nettle") is a historic town in the Koprivshtitsa Municipality in Sofia Province, central Bulgaria, lying on the Topolnitsa River among the Sredna Gora mountains. It was one of the centres of the April uprising in 1876 and is known for its authentic Bulgarian architecture and for its folk music festivals, making it a tourist destination.

Koprivshtitsa preserves the atmosphere of the Bulgarian National Revival period of the 19th century. The town is huddled in the mountain-folds, 111 km east of Sofia. The town has a number of architectural monuments from the period, 383 in all, most of which have been restored to their original appearance. Collections of ethnographical treasures, old weapons, National Revival works of art, fretwork, household weaves and embroidery, national costumes, and typical Bulgarian jewelry have also been preserved. It was here that the first shot of the April Uprising against the Ottoman domination was fired in 1876.

Since 1965, the National Festival of Bulgarian Folklore takes place approximately every five years in Koprivshtitsa, gathering musicians, artists and craftsmen from across Bulgaria. Featuring thousands of performing artists in a pastoral setting in the hills above the town, the Koprivshtitsa festival is the only significant Bulgarian music event focusing on amateur performances. The majority of authentic Bulgarian village music records released during Communist rule were recorded in Koprivshtitsa by Balkanton during the 1970s and 1980s.

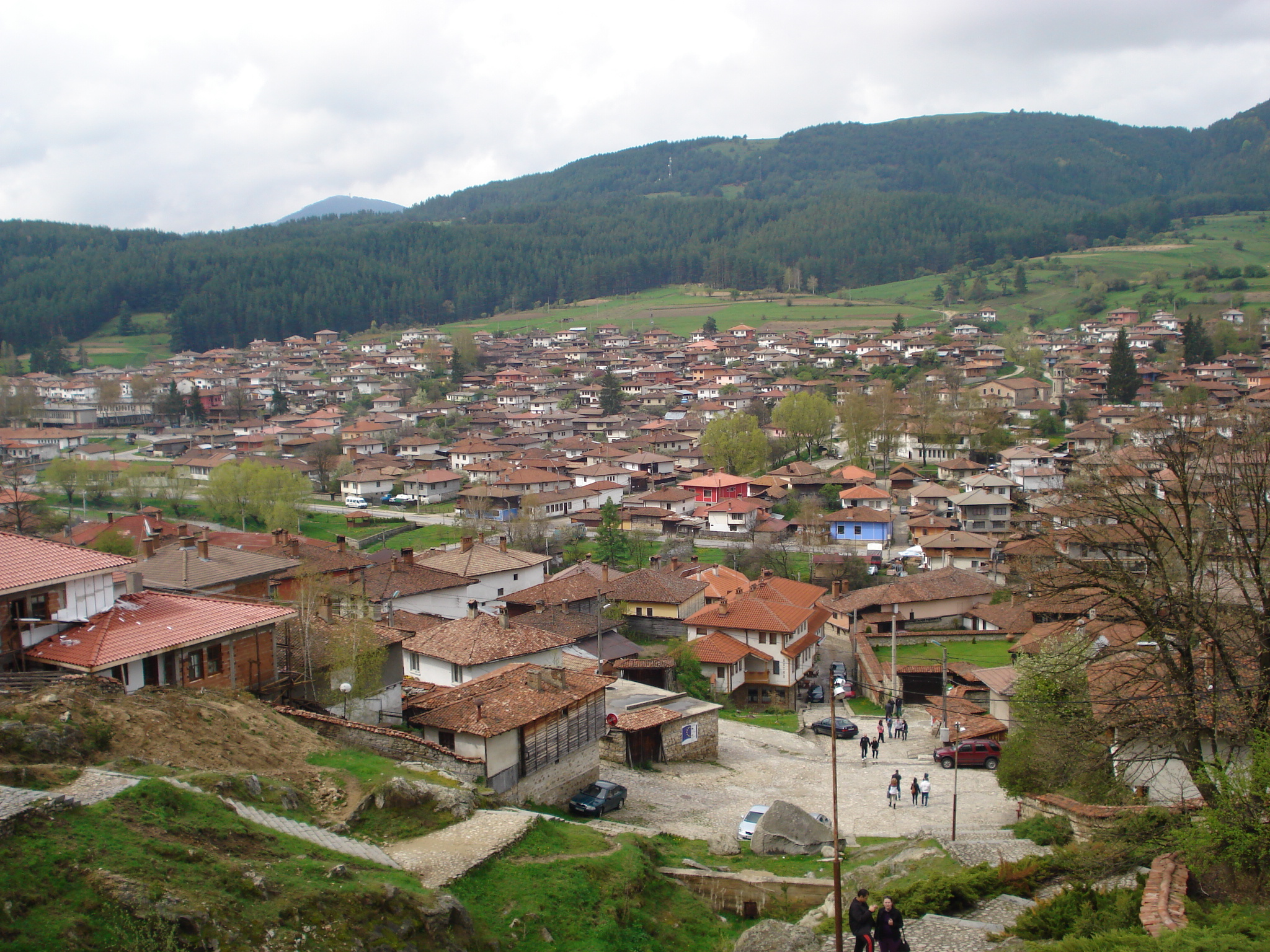
Koprivshtica

As of September 2009, the town has a population of 2,541 and the Deputy Mayor is Radka Lukanova Skenderova. Koprivshtitsa is located at 1,030m above sea level, at 42°38′N 24°21′E.

The anthem of the city is "Beautiful, my forest" with lyrics by Lyuben Karavelov and music by Georgi Goranov.

== Geography ==
The town is located 110 km from the capital Sofia and Pirdop (24 km), 90 km north from Plovdiv and Strelcha (22 km). The town is located in a valley along the river Topolnitsa, in a mountainous area, central part of the mountain Sredna Gora.

== Climate ==
In the coldest month, January, the average temperature is −4,2C, while in the hottest, July, 16,8C.

== Soil ==
In the area of the town Prevail the brown wood soils.

== History ==
There are a few legends about the foundation of the town. One of them is that the town was a crossroads to the towns Zlatarica, Pirdop and Klisura. Another story tells us that Koprivshtitsa was founded by refugees. The Orthodox Cathedral was built in 1817. Twenty years later, the first school was founded. The first museum in the town was established in 1930.

== Demography ==
According to the 2011 census, Koprivshtitsa has 2,410 inhabitants. Nearly all of those are ethnic Bulgarians (97.6%). There are also 44 Roma people living in Koprivshtitsa and only 3 ethnic Turks.

Koprivshtitsa
Year	1887	1910	1934	1946	1956	1965	1975	1985	1992	2001	2005	2009	2011	2021
Population	2,314	2,469	2,326	2,475	3,154	3,211	3,316	3,255	3,132	2,669	??	??	2,410	??
	Highest number ?? in ??													
Sources: National Statistical Institute, citypopulation.de, pop-stat.mashke.org, Bulgarian Academy of Sciences

=== Religion ===
"Assumption" or "Holy Mother" is the oldest church in Koprivshtitsa, built in 1817.

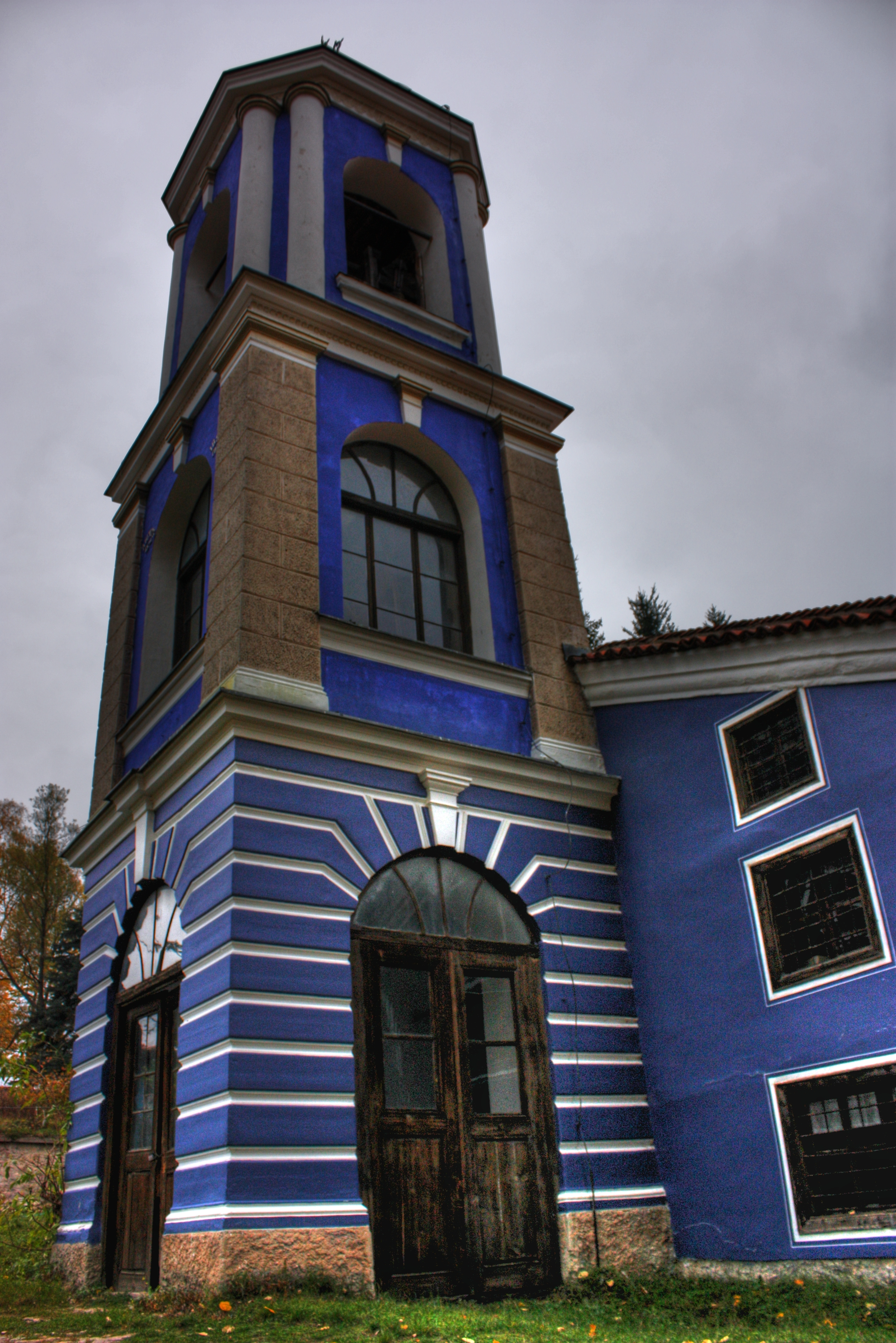
Theotokos church

According to the latest Bulgarian census of 2011, the religious composition, among those who answered the optional question on religious identification, was the following:

Religious composition of Koprivshtitsa Municipality
Orthodox Christianity	86.0%
Catholicism	0.8%
Protestantism	0.2%
Islam	0.0%
No religion	5.3%
Prefer not to answer, others and indefinable	7.7%

== Landmarks ==
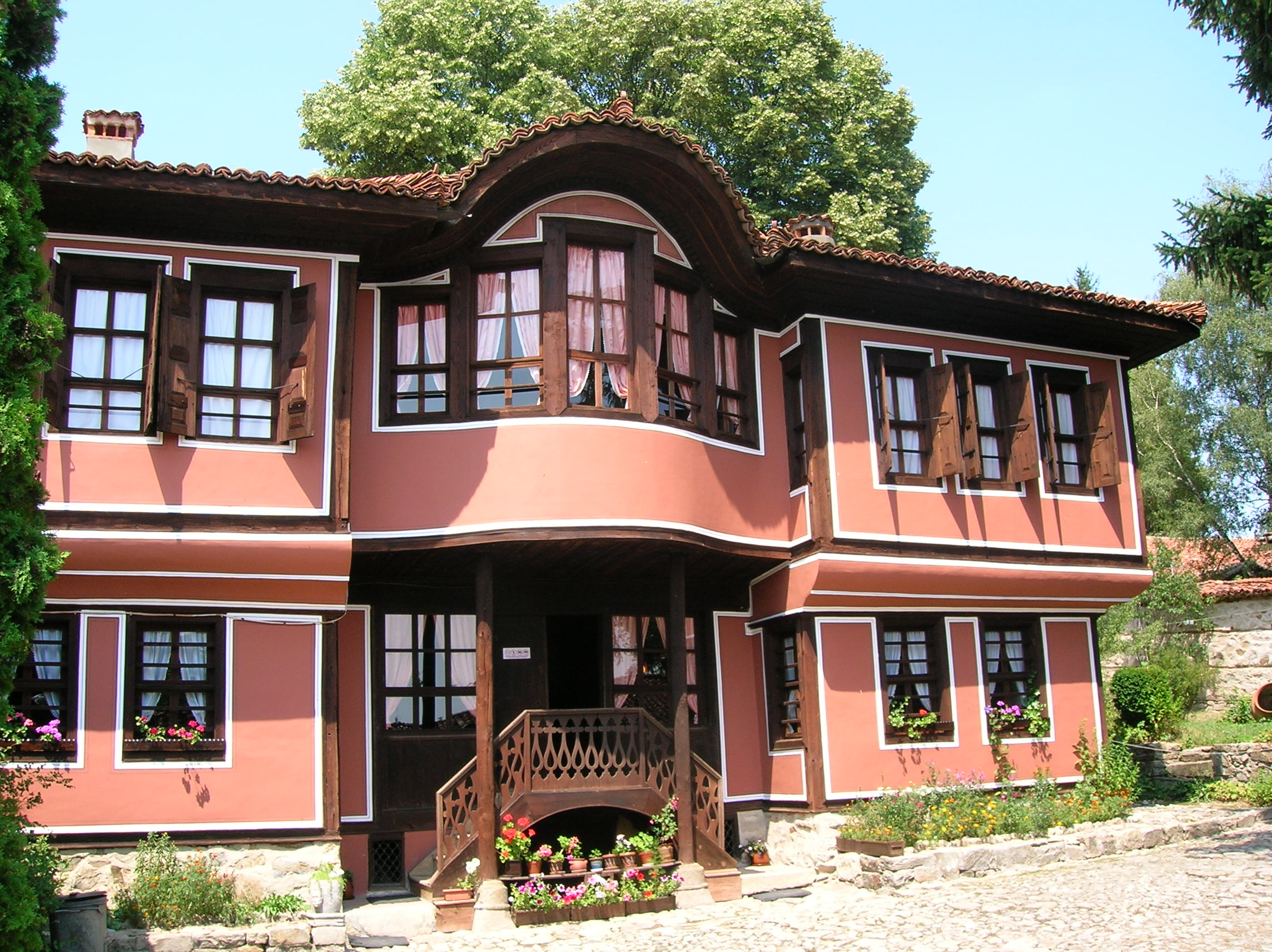
The house of Todor Kableshkov

- the Oslekov House (1853–1856), today an ethnographical museum
- the Georgi Benkovski Memorial House (1831)
- the Lyuben Karavelov Memorial House complex (1810–1835)
- the Dimcho Debelyanov Memorial House (1830)
- the Todor Kableshkov Memorial House (1845)
- the Lyutov House (1854)
- the Nayden Gerov House
- the Church of the Dormition of the Theotokos (1817)
- the Church of St Nicholas (1839)
- the Memorial Ossuary of April 20 housing the bones of those who died in the April Uprising (1926)
- the bridge where the first shot of the uprising was fired in 1876, Kalachev most (1813)
- the Hadzhi Nencho Palaveev Community Centre (chitalishte) (1869)
- the Sts. Cyril and Methodius School (1837), the first class school in Bulgaria (1837)
- the Street of Handicrafts

== Notable people ==
=== Born in Koprivshtitsa ===
- Nayden Gerov (1823–1900), writer
- Yoakim Gruev (1828–1912), teacher and translator
- Lyuben Karavelov (1834–1879), writer
- Georgi Benkovski (1843–1876), revolutionary
- Petko Karavelov (1843–1903), politician
- Todor Kableshkov (1851–1876), revolutionary
- Dimcho Debelyanov (1887–1916), poet

=== Related to Koprivshtitsa ===
- Neophyte of Rila (1790–1881), teacher in the town
- John Butler (musician), ancestry in the town, via great-grandfather

== Gallery ==
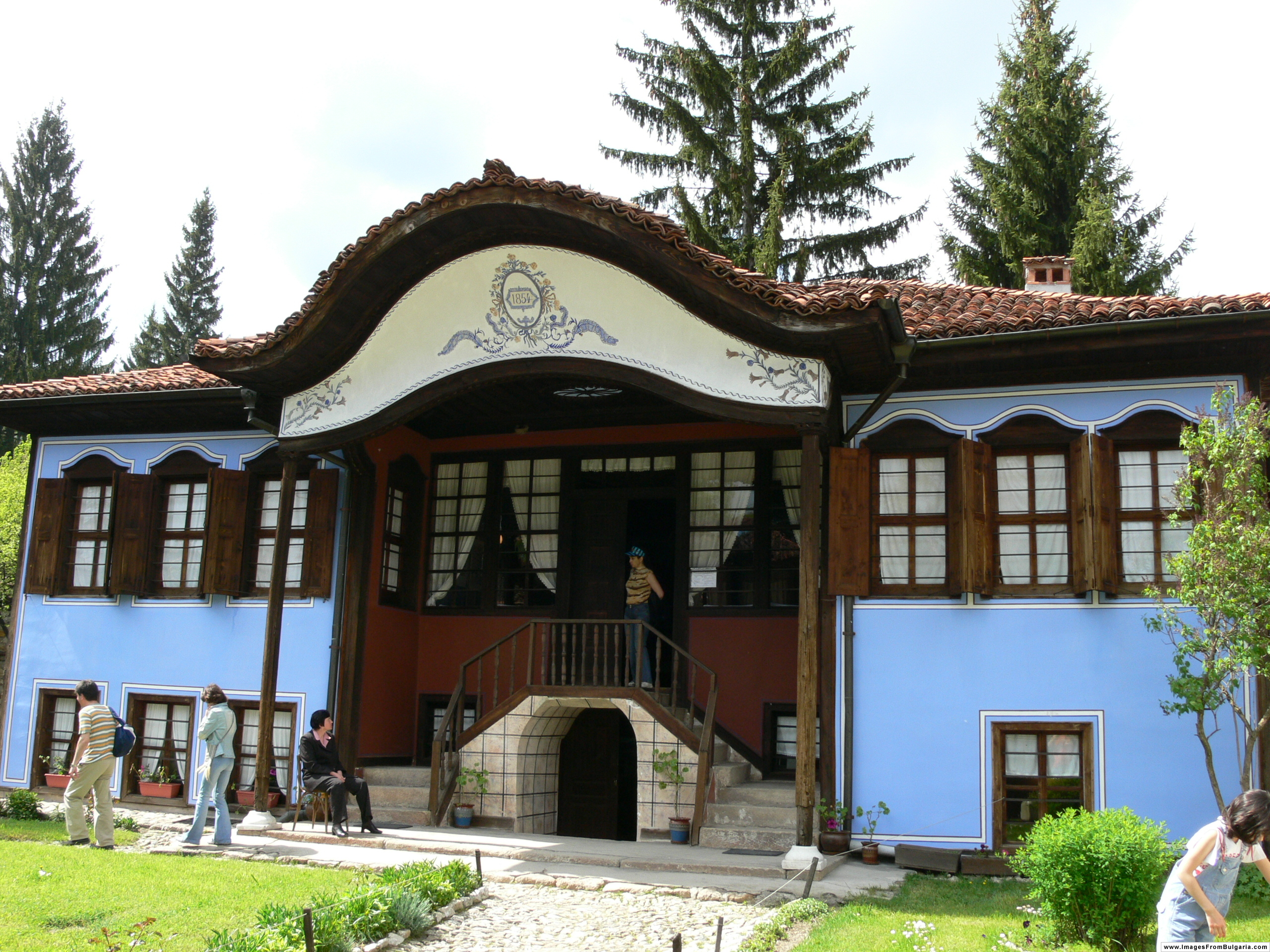

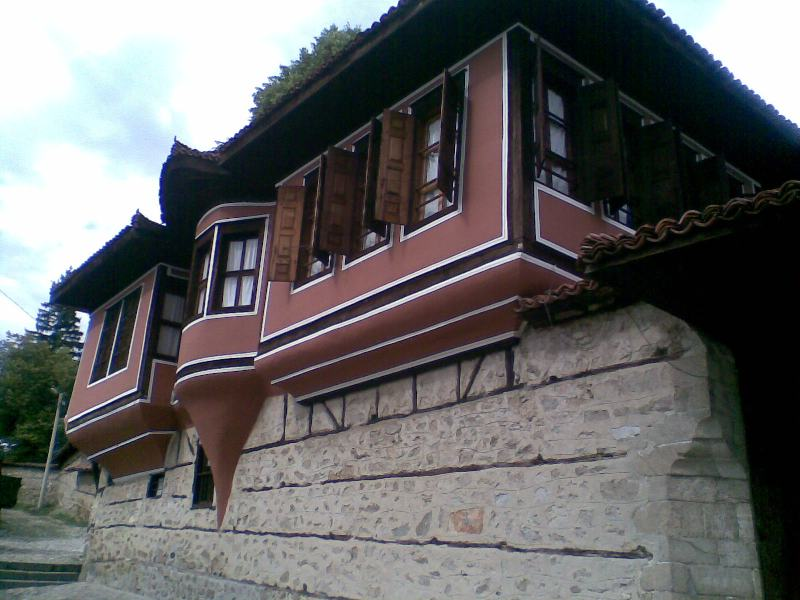

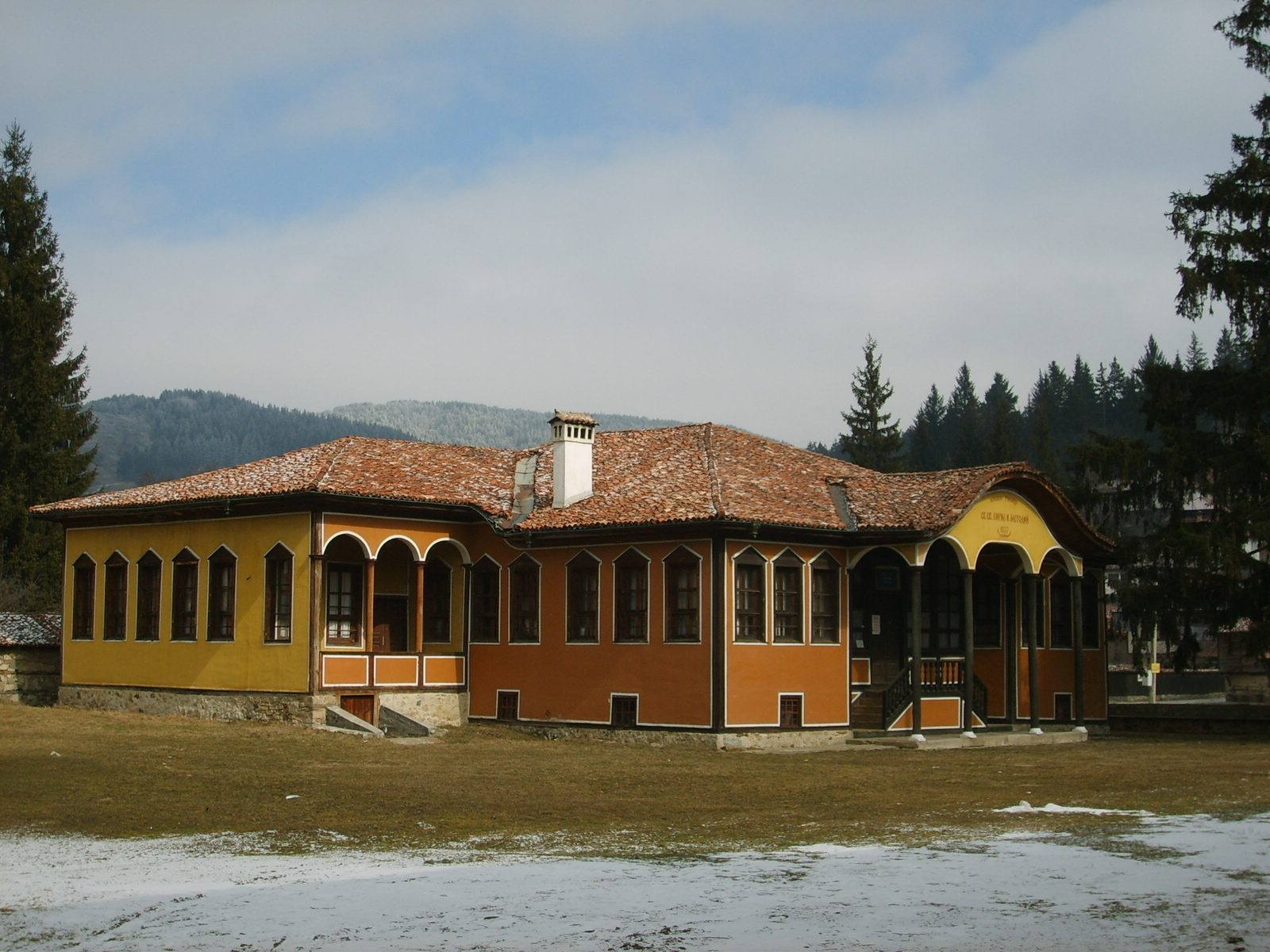

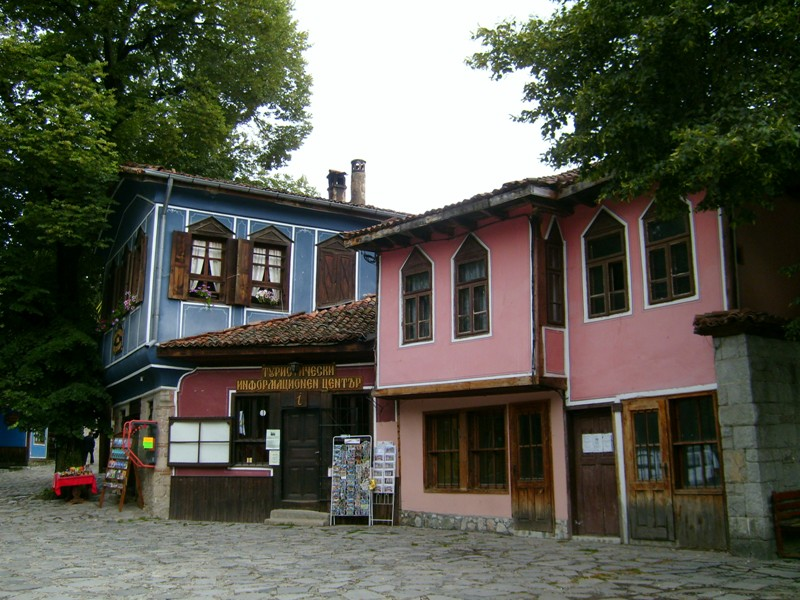

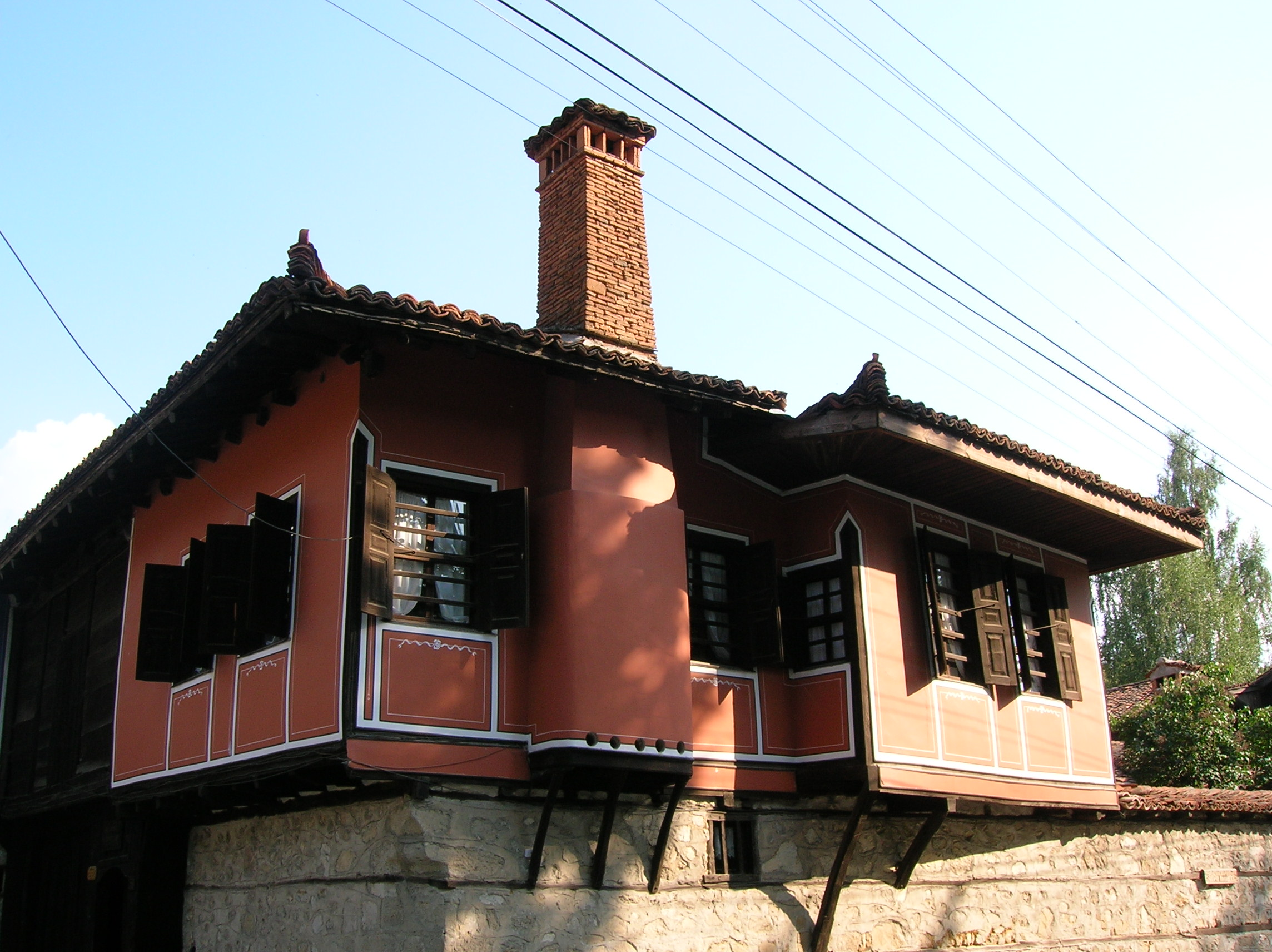

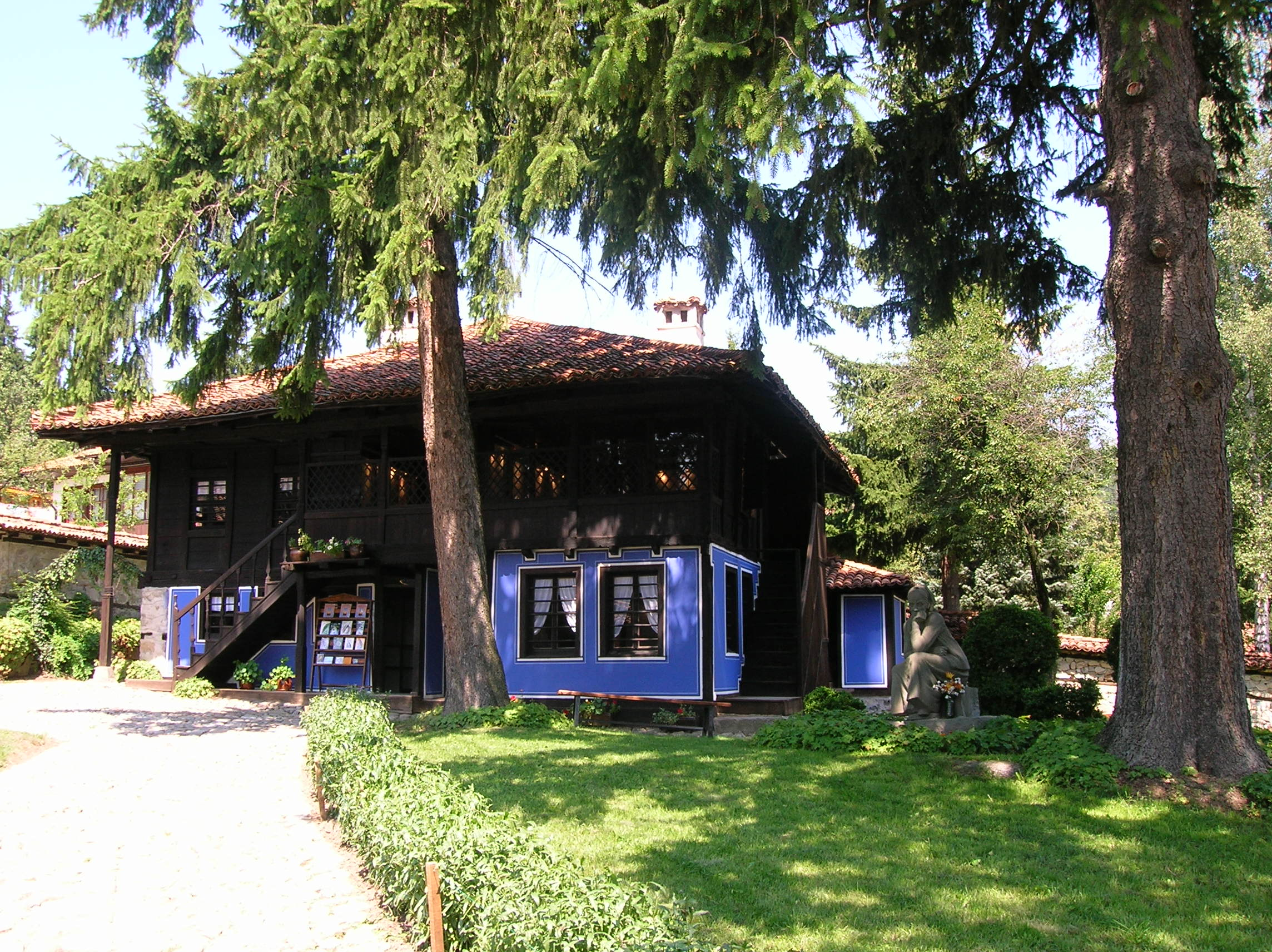

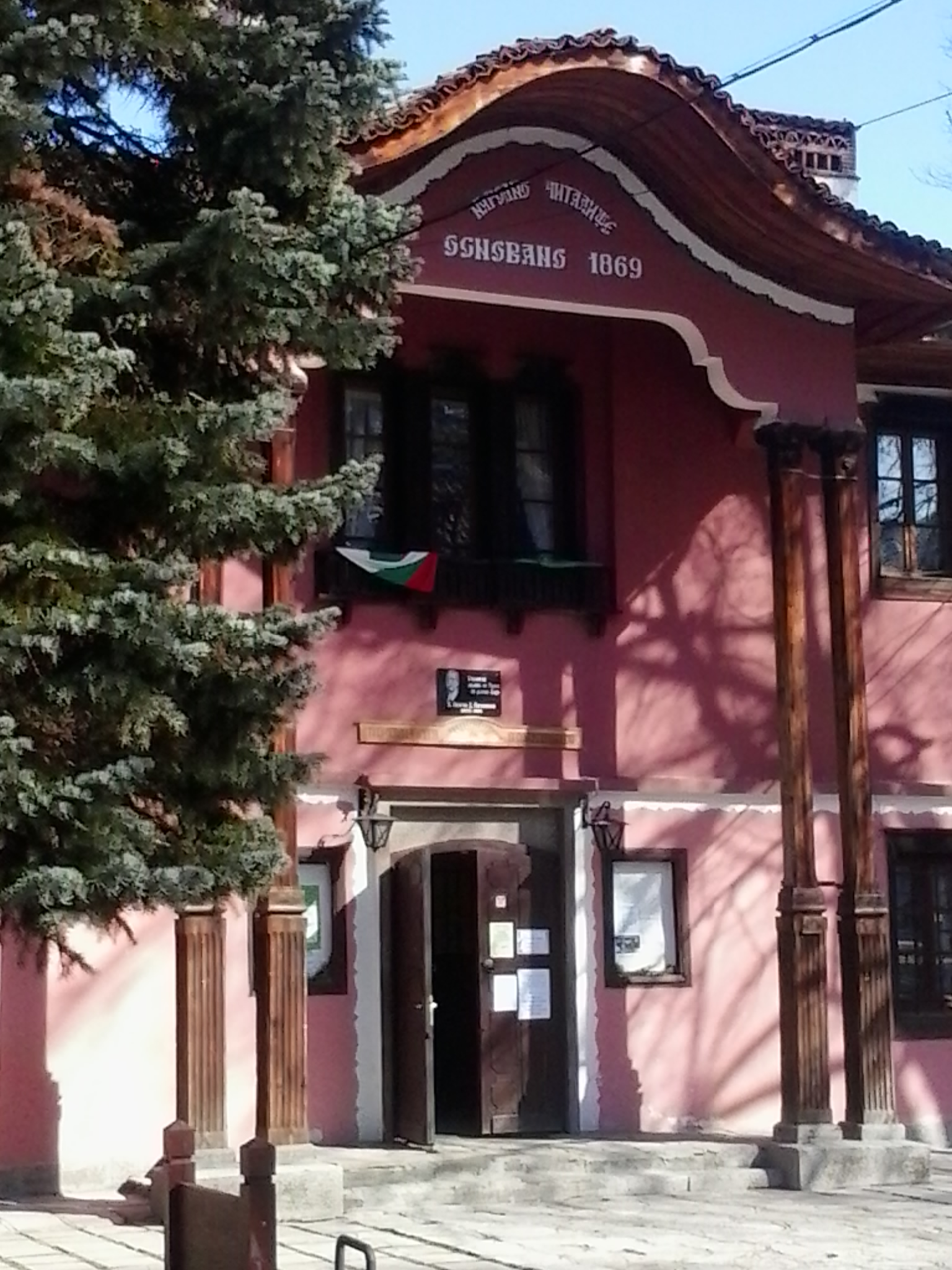

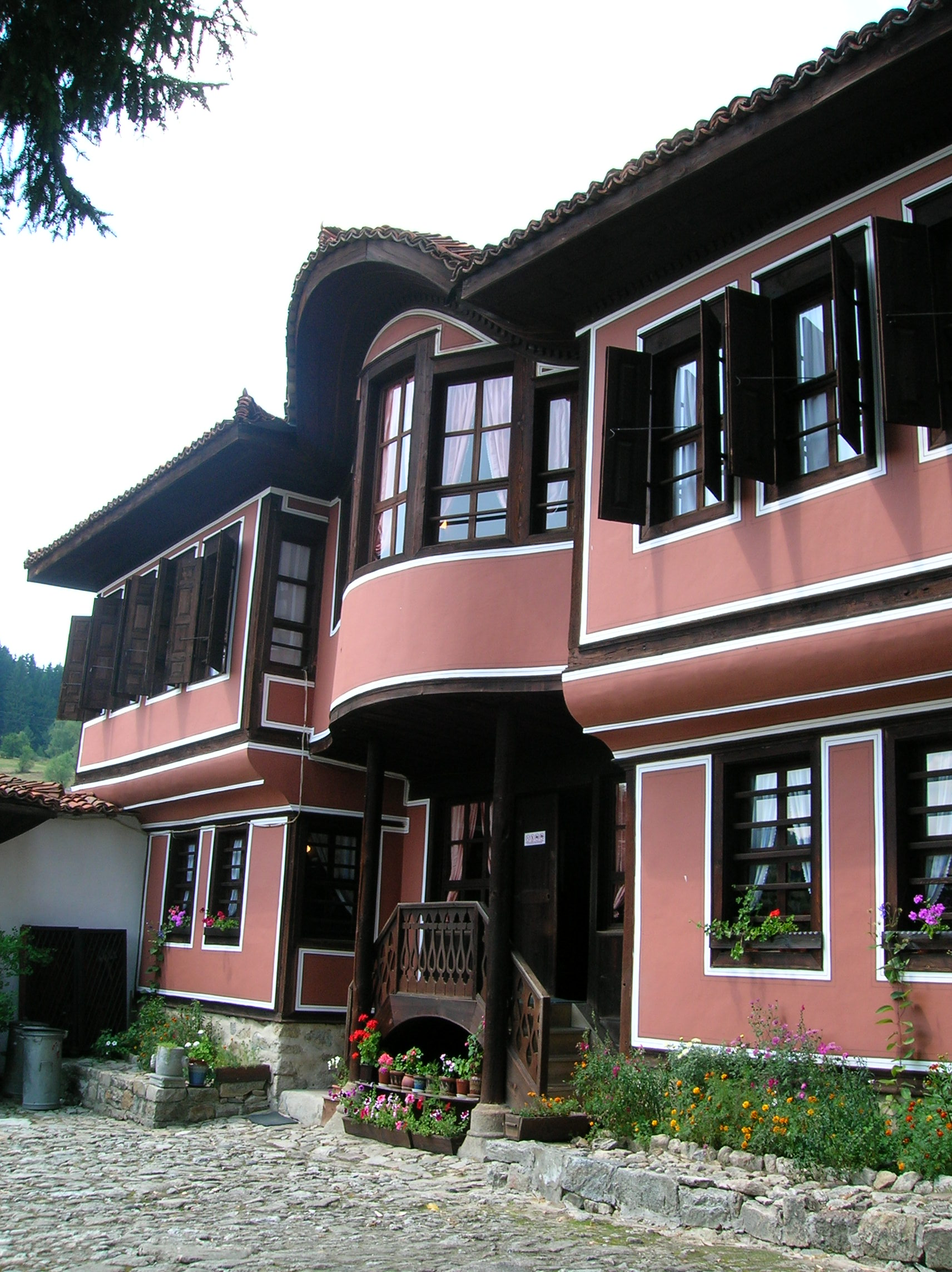

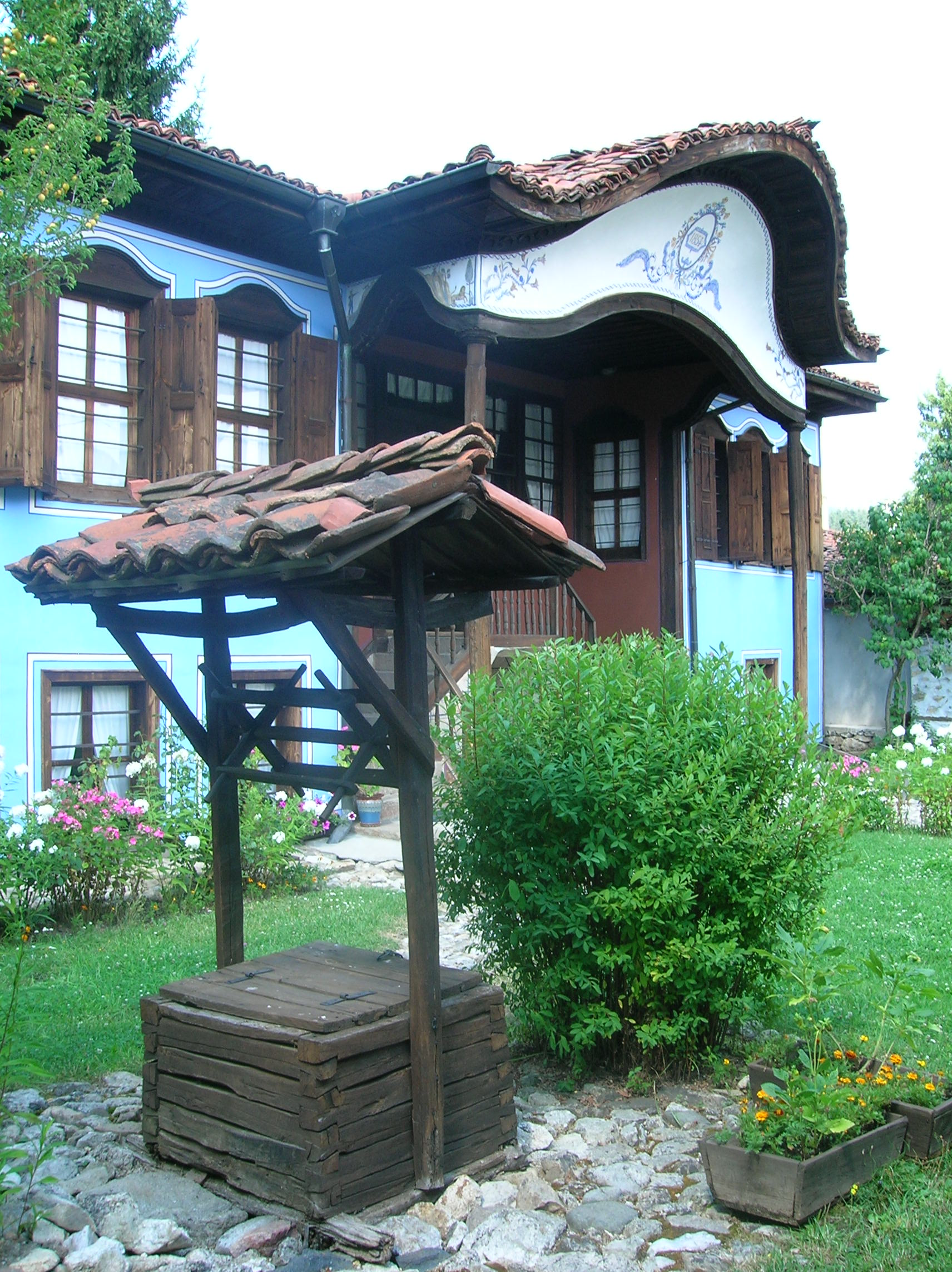

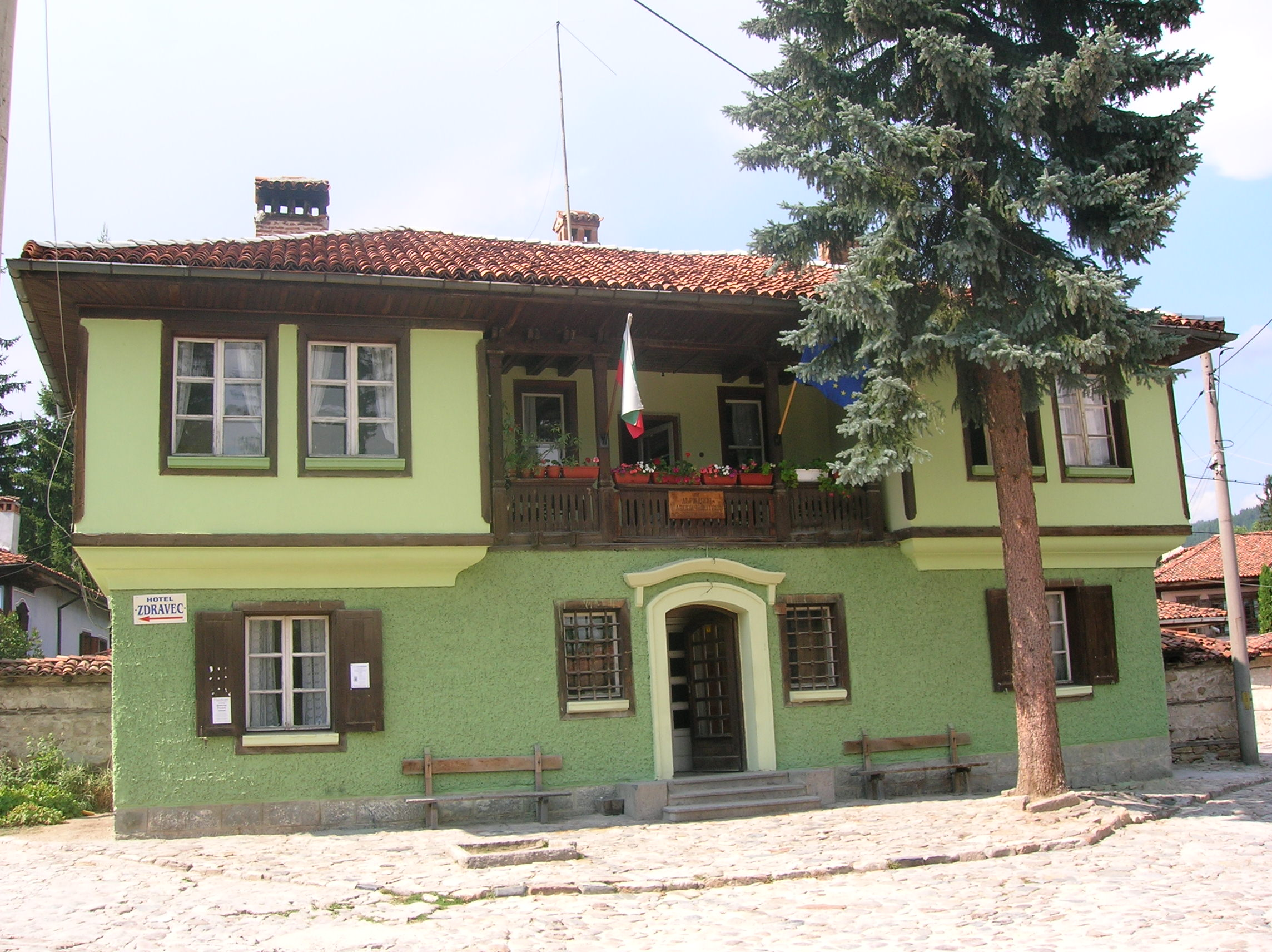

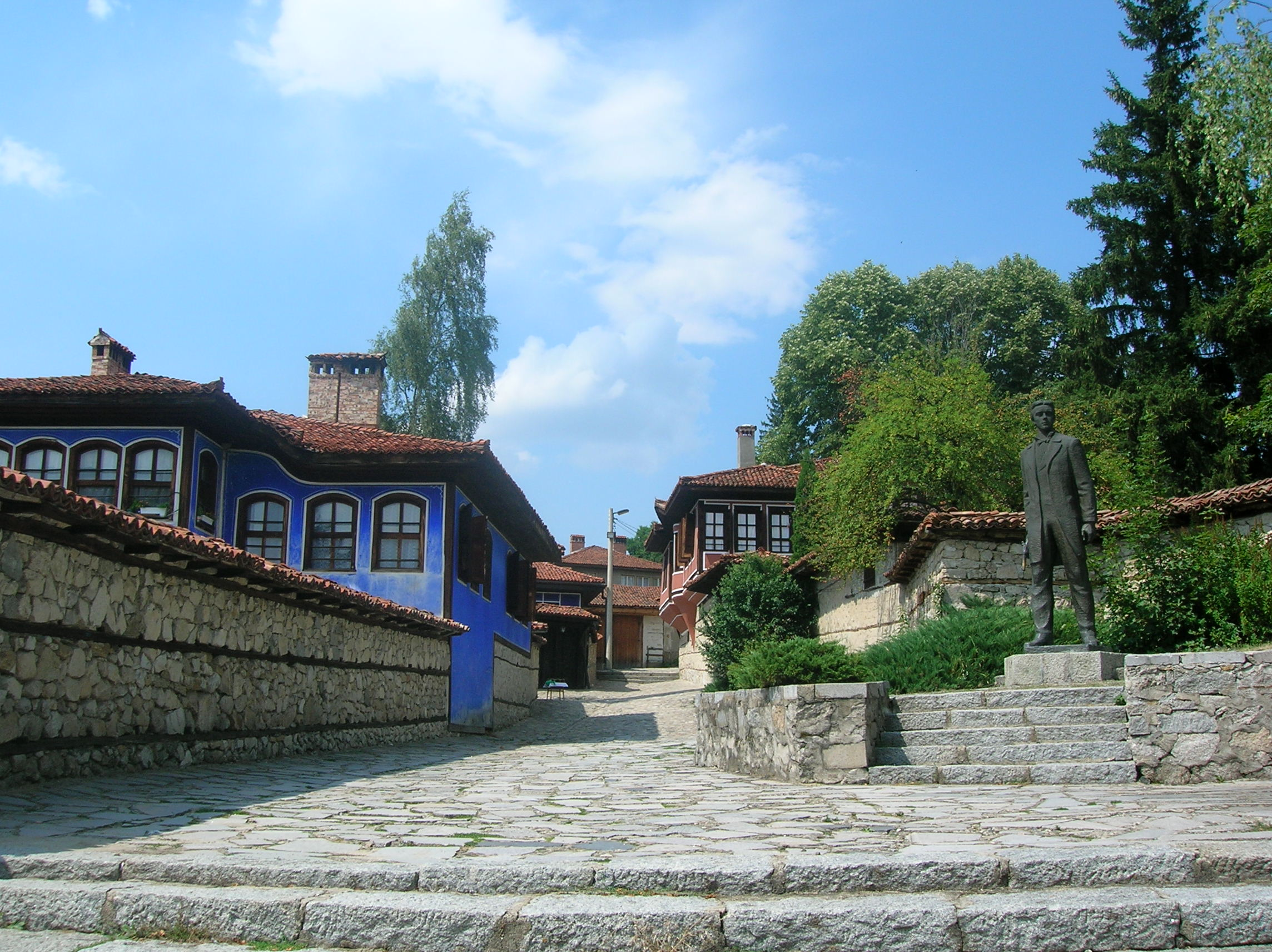

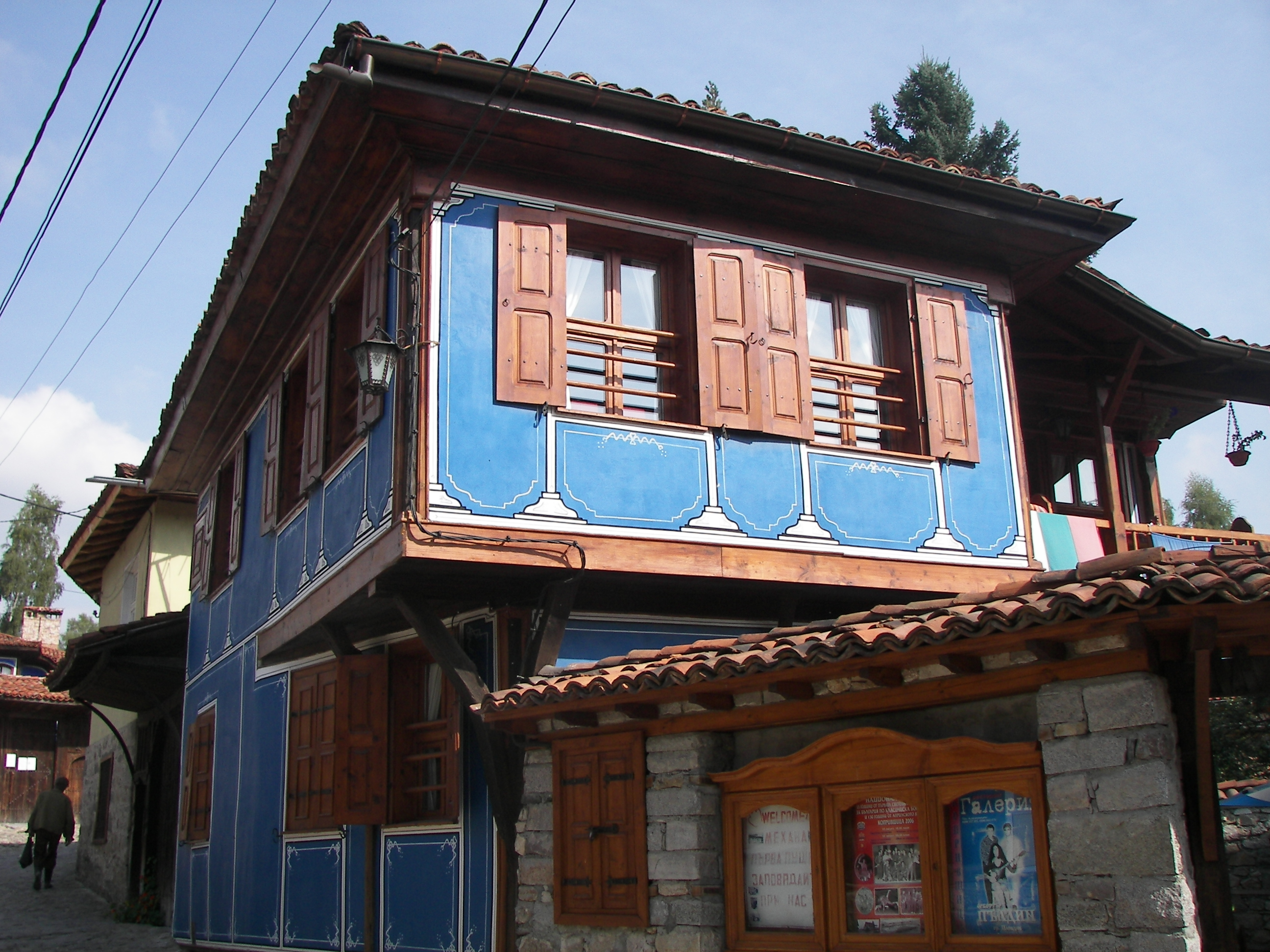

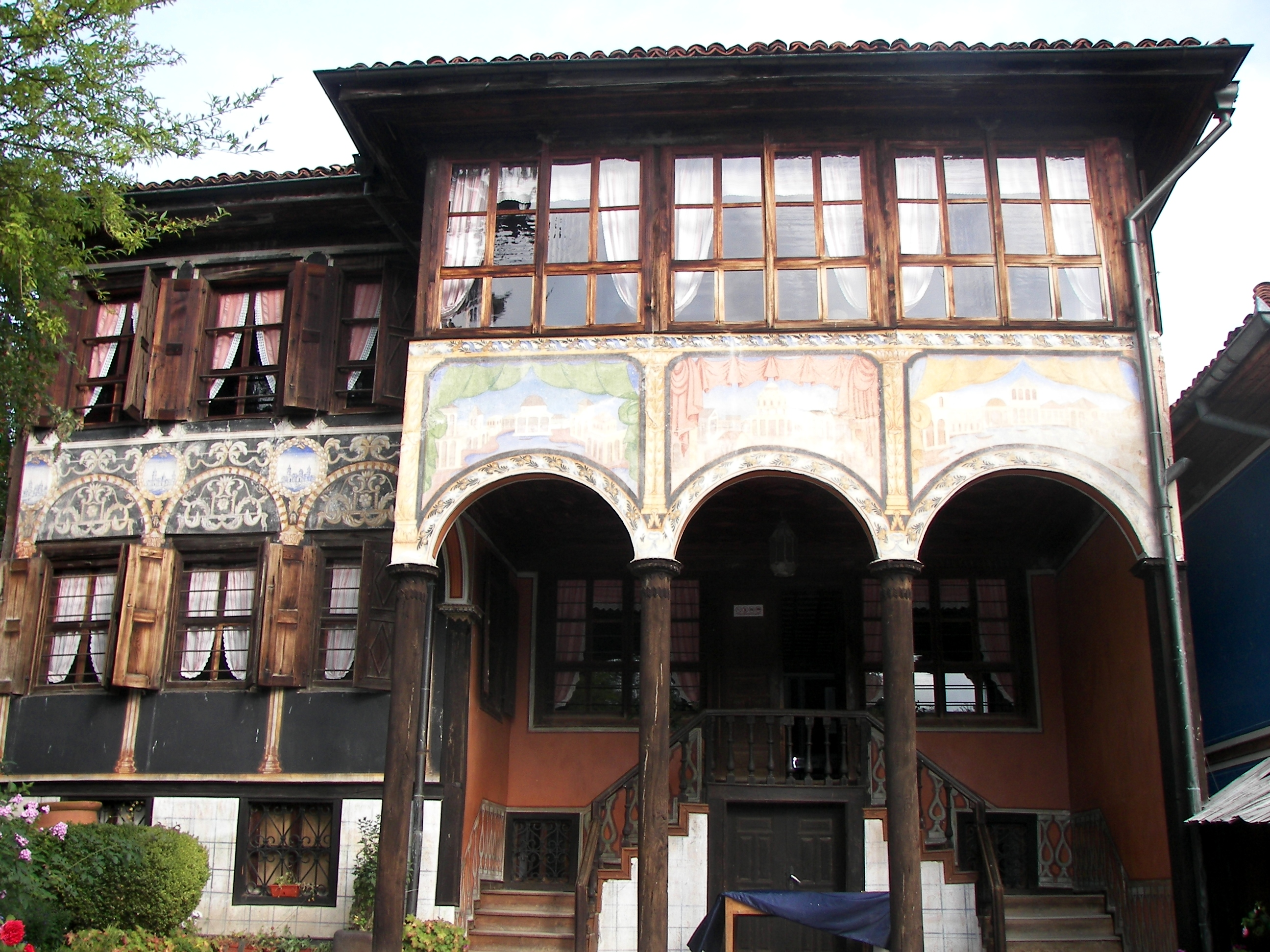

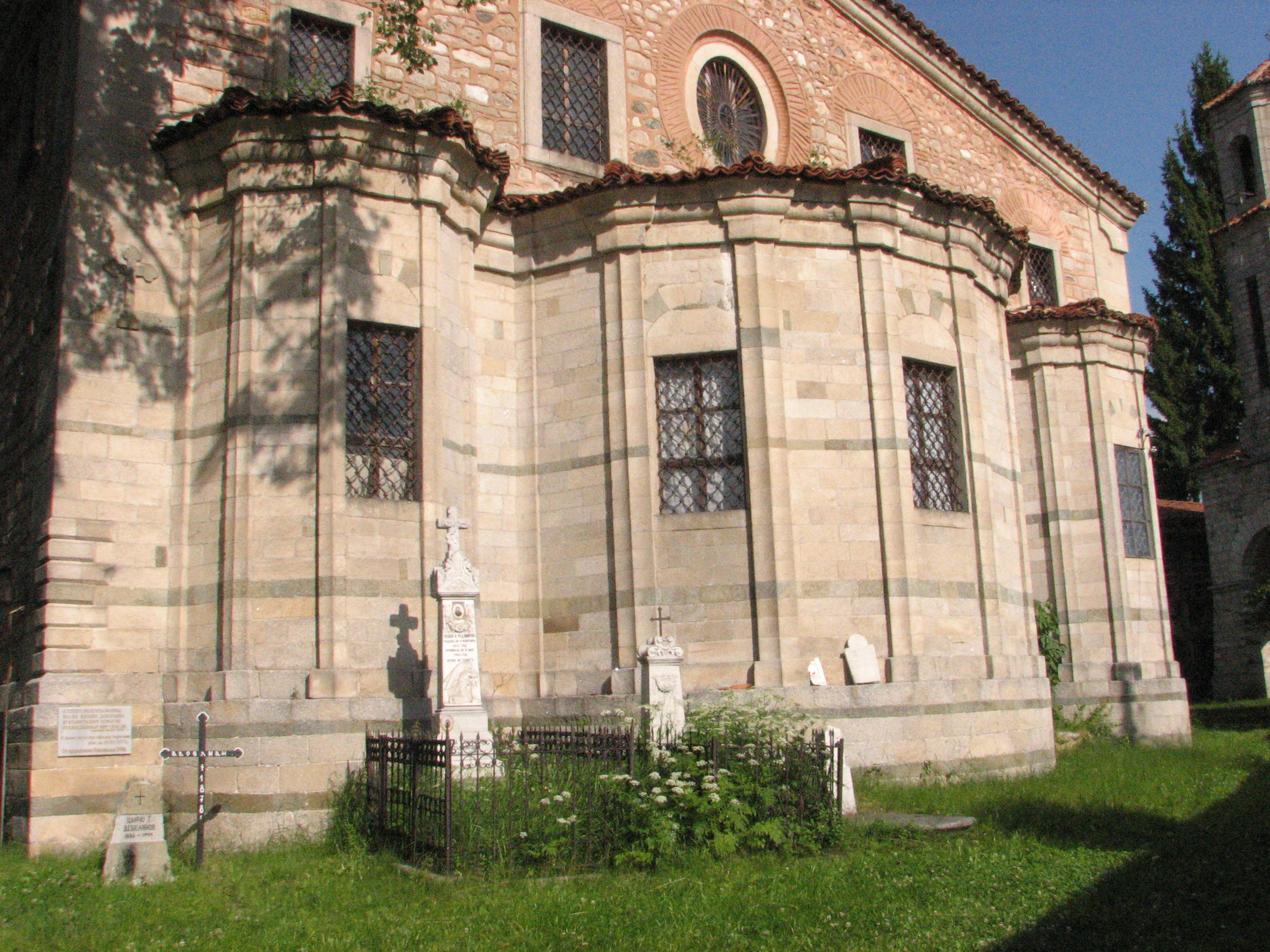

== Twin towns – Sister cities ==
Koprivshtitsa is twinned with:

- Szentendre in Hungary

== See also ==
- April uprising
