= List of Bulgarian writers =

This is a list of notable writers from Bulgaria:

== Fiction and non-fiction authors ==
- Elena Alexieva
- Emil Andreev
- Boris Aprilov
- Milan Asadurov
- Ivan Bogorov
- Hristo Botev
- Hristo Boychev
- Voydan Chernodrinski
- Chudomir
- Lea Cohen
- Constantine of Kostenets
- Constantine of Preslav
- Presbyter Cosmas
- Lyuben Dilov
- Ilko Dimitrov
- Kristin Dimitrova
- Dimitar Dimov
- Sava Dobroplodni
- Anton Donchev
- Vasil Drumev
- Yordan Eftimov
- Deyan Enev
- Zdravka Evtimova
- John Exarch
- Valentin Fortunov
- Lada Galina
- Mihalaki Georgiev
- Nayden Gerov
- Nikola Gigov
- Georgi Gospodinov
- Andrey Gulyashki
- Nikolay Haytov
- Chernorizets Hrabar
- Nikolai Hristozov
- Kiril Hristov
- Rangel Ignatov
- Kalin Iliev
- Dimitar Inkyov
- Angel Karaliychev
- Georgi Karaslavov
- Hristo Karastoyanov
- Stefan Kisyov
- Aleko Konstantinov
- Ventseslav Konstantinov
- Krastyo Krastev
- Lora Lazar
- Vladimir Lukov
- Georgi Markov
- Agop Melkonyan
- Stoyan Mihaylovski
- Svetoslav Minkov
- Aleksandra Monedzhikova
- Vera Mutafchieva
- Chavdar Mutafov
- Galin Nikiforov
- Paisius of Hilendar
- Viktor Paskov
- Konstantin Pavlov
- Elin Pelin
- Valeri Petrov
- Alek Popov
- Fani Popova-Mutafova
- Naum Preslavski
- Khristo Poshtakov
- Yordan Radichkov
- Radoy Ralin
- Tsoncho Rodev
- Milen Ruskov
- Sevda Sevan
- Ivo Siromahov
- Svetoslav Slavchev
- Sophronius of Vratsa
- Georgi Stamatov
- Albena Stambolova
- Emiliyan Stanev
- Petar Stapov
- Lyudmil Stoyanov
- Anton Strashimirov
- Stanislav Stratiev
- Dimitar Talev
- Georgi Tenev
- Kalin Terziyski
- Nayden Todorov
- Petko Todorov
- Stefan Tsanev
- Pavel Tsvetkov
- Ivan Vazov
- Ilya Velchev
- Konstantin Velichkov
- Emanuil A. Vidinski
- Vladislav the Grammarian
- Angel Wagenstein
- Yana Yazova
- Nedyalko Yordanov
- Stoyan Zagorchinov
- Stoyan Zaimov
- Dimitar Kalev

== See also ==
- List of Bulgarian women writers
