= Contemporary Bulgarian Writers =

Contemporary Bulgarian Writers is an online literary platform which presents to the English speaking audience profiles of living Bulgarian authors of fiction and short stories.

== About the Idea ==
Contemporary Bulgarian Writers aims at facilitating the access of the English speaking audience to the contemporary Bulgarian literature. Created in public interest, its mission is to be a crossing-point of the contemporary Bulgarian literature and the English speaking world.

== About the Platform ==
Each author’s profile contains a biography, an excerpt(s) and a picture. Synopses, interviews and critical reviews of the published excerpts are also available. The translators of the published texts are presented there as well.

== Featured Writers ==
Here is a list of the writers presented so far:

- Sekulov, Alexander
- Shpatov, Alexander
- Alexieva, Elena
- Andreev, Emil
- Boykov, Nikolay
- Damianov, Krassimir
- Damyanovska, Svetla
- Deleva, Nataliya
- Denchev, Petar
- Dimitrov, Ivan
- Dimitrova, Kristin
- Dimova, Theodora
- Doneva, Maria
- Fayon, Betti
- Dvoryanova, Emilia
- Evtimova, Zdravka
- Popov, Alek
- Slavchev, Dobromir
- Gospodinov, Georgi
- Zarev, Vladimir
- Ruskov, Milen
- Kanev, Peycho
- Karastoyanov, Hristo
- Nemchev, Vergil
- Nikiforov, Galin
- Radeva, Yanitsa
- Roshkev, Stoil
- Tenev, Georgi
- Terziyski, Kalin
- Zaharieva, Virginia
- Karabashliev, Zachary

== Founder and Funders ==
Contemporary Bulgarian Writers was created in 2010 by the Elizabeth Kostova Foundation. It is supported by the Bulgarian Ministry of Foreign Affairs’ Institute for Culture, the America for Bulgaria Foundation and the American Foundation for Bulgaria.
