= List of ambassadors of Bulgaria to Serbia =

List of Bulgarian ambassadors to Serbia

This is a list of Bulgaria's ambassadors to Serbia. The ambassadors are based in Belgrade.

== List of representatives ==
Envoys to the Principality of Serbia

- 1879–1882: Dimitar Kirovich

Envoys to the Kingdom of Serbia

- 1882–1883: Dimitar Kirovich
- 1883–1885: Ivan Evstratiev Geshov
- 1885–1887: Georgi Stranski
- 1887–1889: Dimitar Minchevich
- 1889–1892: Petar Dimitrov
- 1892–1896: Bogdan Goranov
- 1896–1897: Haralambi Srmagiev
- 1897–1899: Mihalaki Georgiev
- 1899–1902: Hristo Brakalov
- 1902–1904: Konstantin Velichkov
- 1904–1905: Hristofor Hesapchiev
- 1905–1907: Dimitar Rizov
- 1908–1913: Andrey Tosev
- 1914–1915: Stefan Chaprashikov

Envoys to the Kingdom of Serbs, Croats, and Slovenes

- 1920–1923: Kosta Todorov
- 1923–1929: Konstantin Vakarelski

Envoys to the Kingdom of Yugoslavia

- 1928–1933: Konstantin Vakarelski
- 1933–1934: Georgi Kyoseivanov
- 1935–1936: Dimo Kazasov
- 1936–1937: Dechko Karadzhov
- 1937–1940: Ivan Popov
- 1940–1941: Stoil Stoilov

Ambassadors to the Federal People's Republic of Yugoslavia

- 1945–1947: Peter Todorov
- 1947–1948: Sava Ganovski
- 1948–1949: Pelo Pelovski
- 1953–1956: Lubomir Angelov
- 1956–1959: Misho Nikolov
- 1959–1962: Grudi Atanasov

Ambassadors to the Socialist Federal Republic of Yugoslavia

- 1962–1967: Grudi Atanasov
- 1967–1972: Georgi Petkov
- 1972–1974: Nikolay Minchev
- 1974–1978: Stefan Petrov
- 1978–1982: Rayko Nikolov
- 1982–1987: Stefan Staykov
- 1988–1989: Belcho Belchev
- 1990–1992: Marko Markov

Ambassadors to the Federal Republic of Yugoslavia

- 1992–1993: Marko Markov
- 1993–1994: Jordan Kozhuharov
- 1994–1996: Georgi Jurukov
- 1996–1997: Filip Ishpekov
- 1997–2001: Ivaylo Trifonov
- 2001–2003: Yani Milchakov

Ambassadors to the State Union of Serbia and Montenegro

- 2003–2005: Yani Milchakov
- 2005–2006: Georgi Dimitrov

Ambassadors to the Republic of Serbia

- 2006–2012: Georgi Dimitrov
- 2012–2016: Angel Dimitrov
- 2016–2020: Radko Vlaykov
- 2021–present: Petko Doykov

== See also ==
- Bulgaria–Serbia relations
- Foreign relations of Bulgaria
- List of ambassadors of Serbia to Bulgaria
