= Aleksiev =

Aleksiev (masculine, Bulgarian: Алексиев) or Aleksieva (feminine, Bulgarian: Алексиева), also transliterated as Alexiev or Alexieva, is a Bulgarian surname. Notable people with the surname include:

- Boyko Aleksiev (born 1963), Bulgarian figure skater
- Dimitar Aleksiev (born 1993), Bulgarian footballer
- Elena Alexieva (born 1975), Bulgarian writer
- Evgueniy Alexiev (born 1967), French opera singer
- Metodi Aleksiev (1887–1924), Bulgarian revolutionary
- Rayko Aleksiev (1893–1944), Bulgarian painter and writer
- Todor Aleksiev (born 1983), Bulgarian volleyball player

== See also ==
- Aleksiev Glacier, a glacier of Graham Land, Antarctica
