= Angela Rodel =

American-born literary translator

Angela Rodel (Bulgarian: Анджела Родел) is an American-born Bulgarian-to-English literary translator and the executive director of the Bulgarian Fulbright Commission.

In 2023, Rodel won the International Booker Prize for her translation of Georgi Gospodinov's novel Time Shelter.

== Life ==
Rodel was born in Milwaukee. She graduated from Burnsville High School in 1992. She has a B.A. in linguistics from Yale University and an M.A. in linguistics and ethnomusicology from UCLA. She joined a Slavic chorus at Yale and first came to Bulgaria in 1996 to study its language and music at Sofia University.

Rodel has been living in Sofia, Bulgaria since 2004 with her Bulgarian husband and daughter. She was awarded Bulgarian citizenship in 2014.

== Selected translations ==
- Holy Light by Georgi Tenev
- Thrown into Nature by Milen Ruskov (Open Letter Books, 2011)
- Nine Rabbits by Virginia Zaharieva (Istros Books, 2012)
- 18% Gray by Zachary Karabashliev (Open Letter Books, 2013)
- A Short Tale of Shame by Angel Igov (Open Letter Books, 2013)
- The Parchment Maze by Lyudmila Filipova (CreateSpace Independent Publishing Platform, 2013)
- Dante's Antichthon by Lyudmila Filipova (Egmont Bulgaria, 2014)
- The Physics of Sorrow by Georgi Gospodinov (Liveright, 2015)
  - AATSEEL 2016 Best Literary Translation into English winner
  - PEN Translation Prize nominee
  - National Translation Award nominee
  - Best Translated Book Award nominee
- Party Headquarters by Georgi Tenev (Open Letter Books, 2016)
- The Wolf Hunt by Ivailo Petrov (Archipelago Books, 2017)
- Time Shelter by Georgi Gospodinov (Weidenfeld & Nicolson, 2022)
  - International Booker Prize winner
- The Case of Cem by Vera Mutafchieva (Sandorf Passage, 2024)
- Death and the Gardener by Georgi Gospodinov (Weidenfeld & Nicolson, 2024)
