= Nikolay Hristozov =

Nikolay Hristozov may refer to:

- Nikolai Hristozov (1931–2015), Bulgarian writer and poet
- Nikolay Hristozov (footballer) (born 1982), Bulgarian footballer
