= Varban Stamatov =

Bulgarian writer (1924–1998)

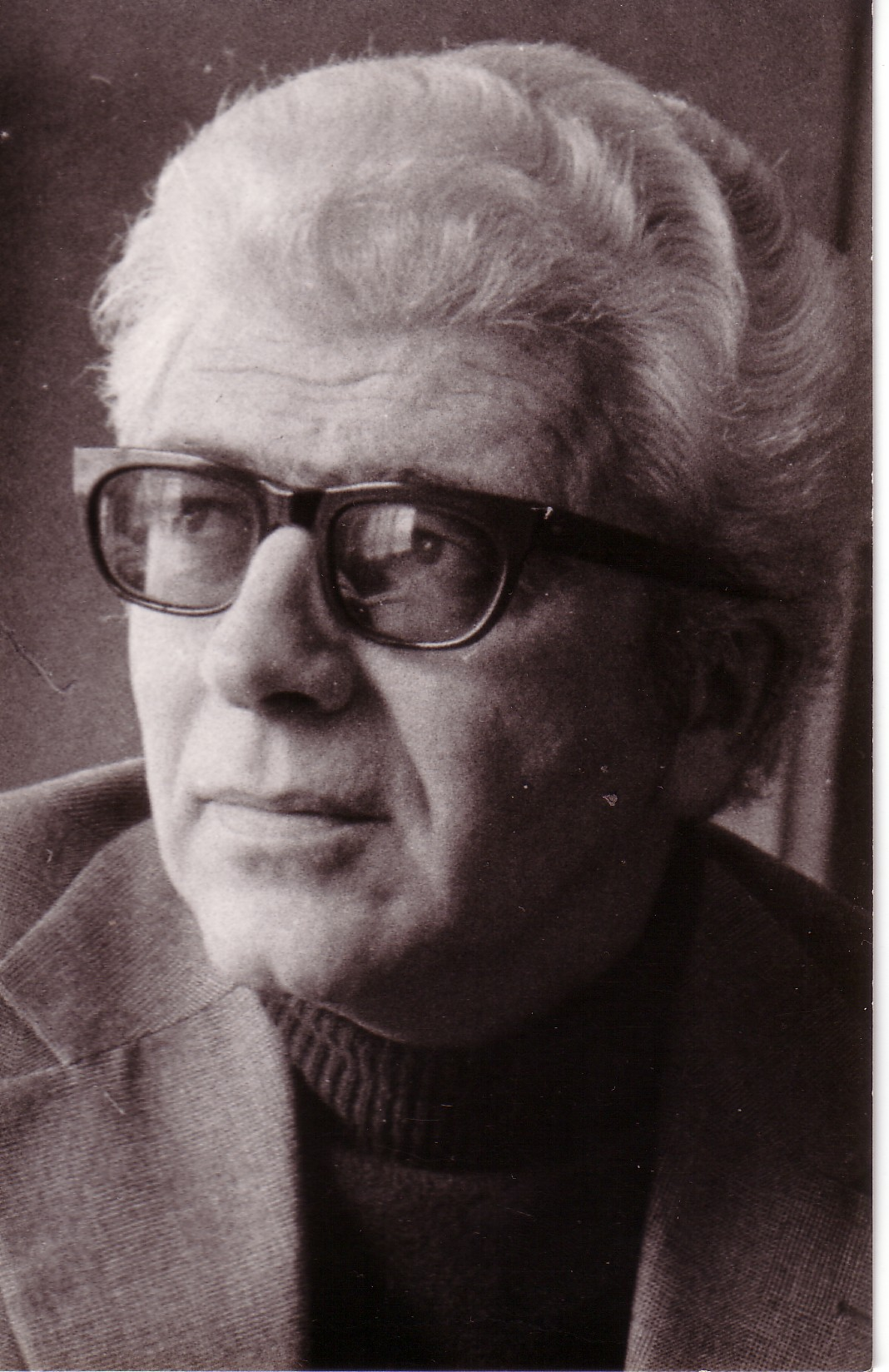
Varban, circa 1984

Varban Stamatov (Bulgarian: Върбан Стаматов; 27 May 1924 – 23 November 1998) was a Bulgarian writer, marine novelist, publicist and editor. The magnetism of the world's oceans and faraway lands were prominent features in his art. He travelled extensively to as far as the Arctic circle, including the USA, China, Japan, Indonesia, Somalia, Egypt, Poland, Germany, Hungary, Italy, the former USSR, Armenia, England, France, gathering material for his publications.

== Personal background ==
Varban Stamatov was born 27 May 1924 in Veliko Turnovo, Bulgaria. He spent his childhood and youth in poverty in Varna and the surrounding villages. His mother, widowed young, was a teacher, who encouraged her children to read those "eternal books", essential as bread itself, literary works by authors such as Ivan Vazov, Dostoyevski, Jack London, Cervantes, Rabelais and Homer. As a student Varban spent hours in the local library studying ancient Greek, Latin, Russian and German which enabled him to support his family by helping other fellow students with their lessons. When he graduated from High School he was awarded a scholarship by the Ministry of Education. He was an excellent swimmer and won a local Varna championship for two consecutive years. He was in the final stages of World War II on the Fatherland Front as a war correspondent.

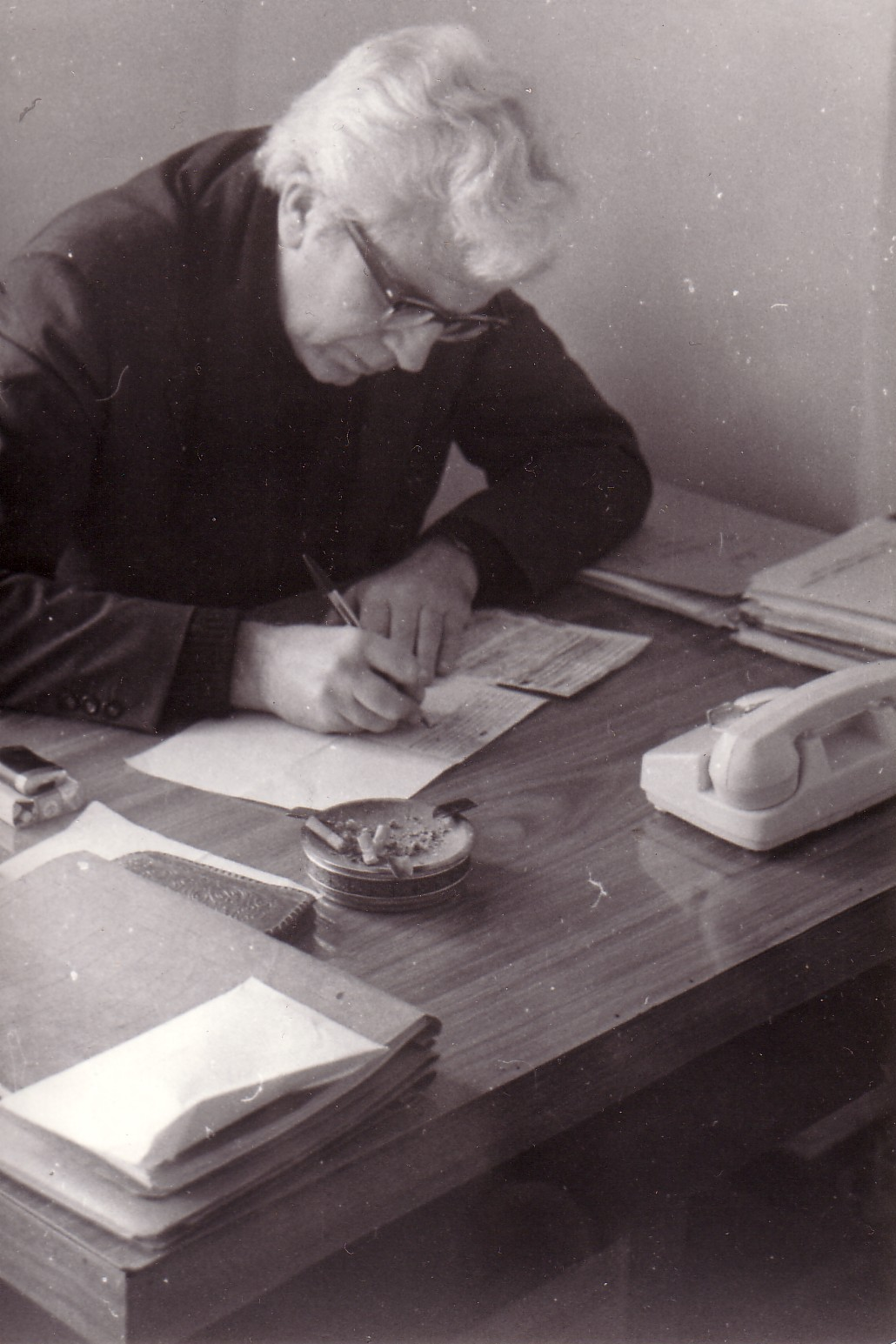
Varban in Sofia, 1964

After the war Varban Stamatov studied medicine and philosophy at Sofia University. He worked as a journalist, later as editor, writing for newspapers such as (Bulgarian: Изгрев) "Izgrev", (Bulgarian: Литературен Фронт) "Literary Front", (Bulgarian: Вечерни новини) "Evening News", (Bulgarian: Народна култура) "National Culture", (Bulgarian: списание Пламък) magazine "The Flame", publishers "Georgi Bakalov" (Varna) and (Bulgarian: издателство Български Писател) "Bulgarian Writer" (Sofia). Subsequently he wrote numerous novels on marine themes. When he was not at sea, he mostly lived and worked in Sofia, within a circle of Bulgarian intellectuals, dramatists, film directors, theatre producers, artists, composers, conductors, poets, literary editors, critics and authors. His colleagues and friends included Bancho Banov, Georges Tutev, Mladen Isaev, Emil Manov, Valeri Petrov, Nikolai Popov, Ducho Mundrov, Leda Mileva, (daughter of poet Geo Milev), Dora Gabe, Pavel Vezhinov and Boris Aprilov.

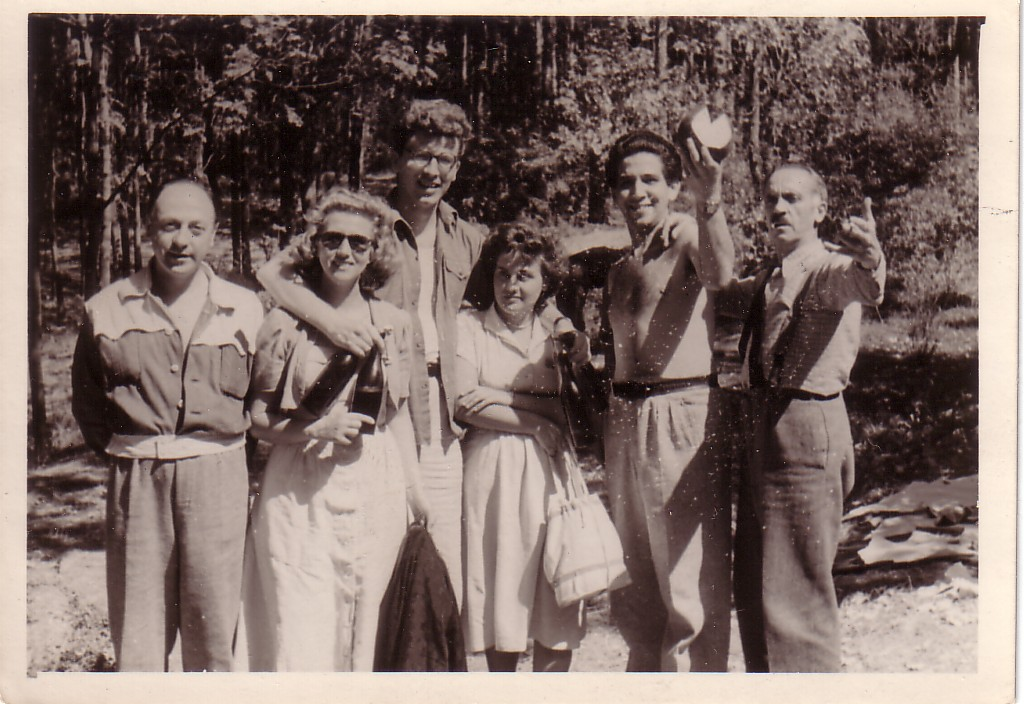
Varban Stamatov, Bancho Banov and colleagues at social event, 1948

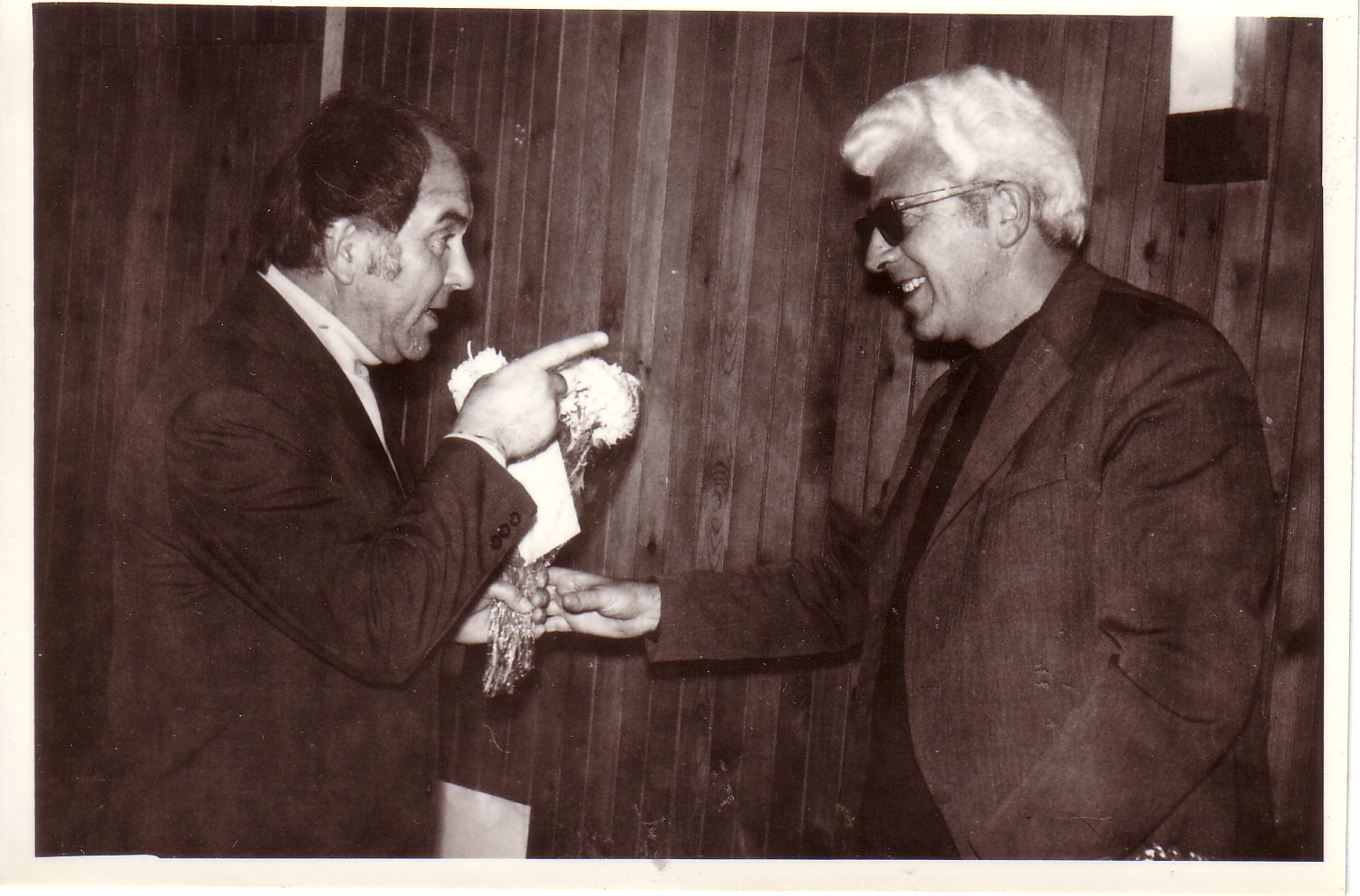
Varban 50th anniversary celebration

In Az-buki (1993) Georgi Tsankov comments on "In the Fog" as being "a literary work with huge factual and philosophical value". In "Plamuk" (1984) Bancho Banov says "Varban Stamatov isn't one of the praised writers... (ibid.) more importantly, he's one of the read writers". He was awarded a temporary home in Sopot, his author's mountain retreat at the foot of the majestic Balkan Mountains- Stara Planina. He shared this home with his third wife Fransi Kevork Bahchedzhian, pseudonym Sevda Sevan. Varban and Fransi spent 20 years together in Sofia and Ahtopol, near the Turkish border where they both wrote their best novels. He was a member of the Bulgarian Union of Writers Bulgarian: Съюз на българските писатели. In his life he dreamt of escaping from the stifling city to venture out to the oceans, the eternal sway of waves, the vast expanse, the connection man makes with the eternal in himself. In his last novel he wrote: ″Each of us who has been on this earth is a tiny enigma frequently unspoken for various reasons and is just a one-way passenger who comes and goes seldom leaving some tangible trail. All of us in the final reckoning, no matter how vain, are merely dust for the wind, to be blown about whilst yet alive along with all our absurd passions, misapprehensions, intolerances, manias for achieving justice, fears, tom-foolery....″ He died in Sofia, Bulgaria in 1998.

== Published works ==
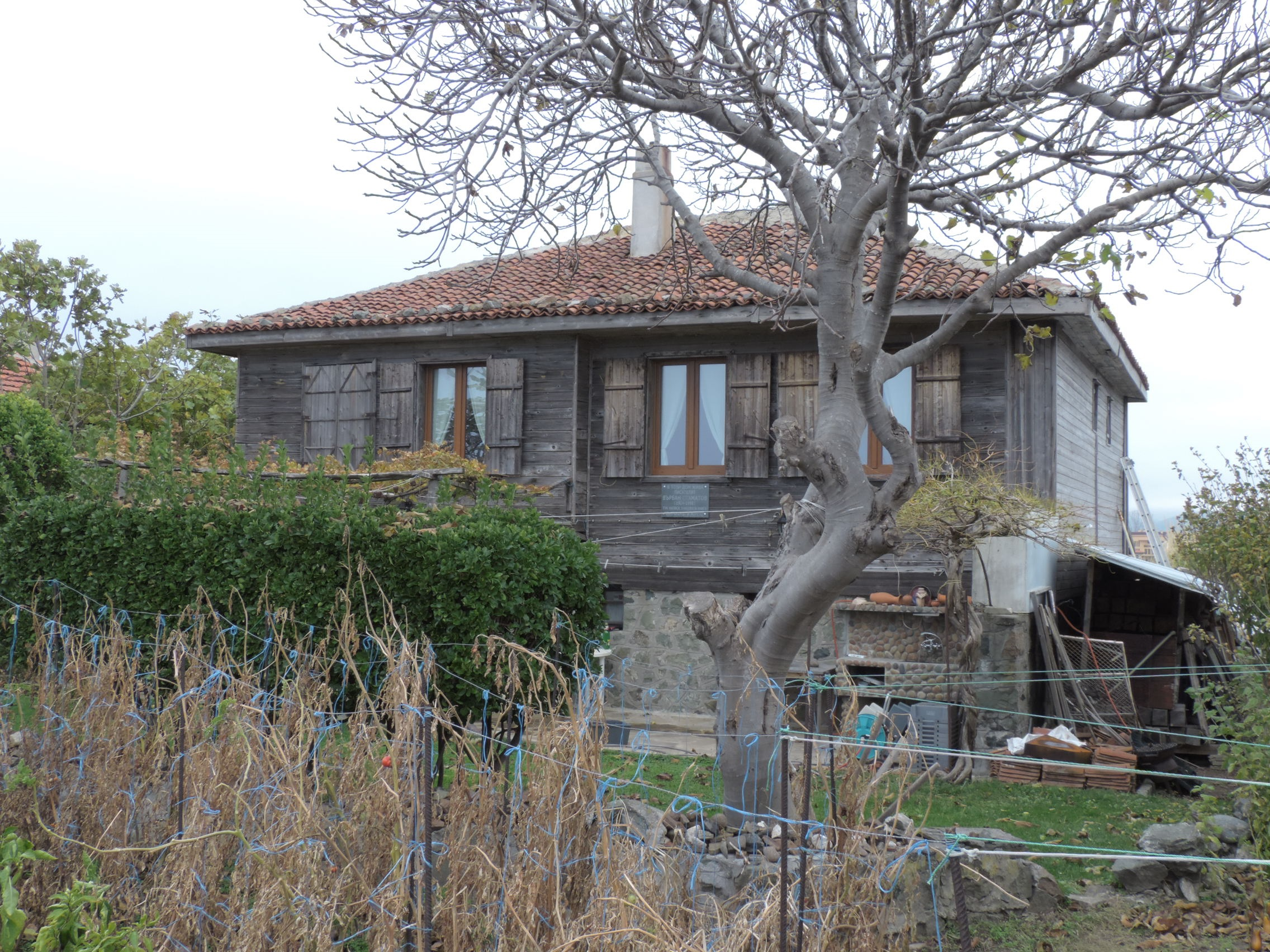
Varban Stamatov's house in Ahtopol, where he wrote his novel "The Bulgarian and the sea". A memorial plaque is placed on the wooden wall.

- Soldier's Chronicles (1948)"
- Out of love short novel (1957)"
- The old boatswain narrates short stories for teenagers (1960)"
- The coast of the poor novel 1st ed.(1964), 2nd ed."Profizdat" Sofia (1989)"
- Anya (1967)
- Islanders Sofia (1968)
- Letters from the sea Sofia (1969–1984)
- The seal cub novelette for children Sofia (1969)
- Flagman 1st ed.(1972), 2nd ed. Vol.II Sofia "Bulgarian Writer" (1984)
- The Great Bitter Lake 1st ed.(1979), 2nd ed. Vol.I "Bulgarian Writer", (1984)
- Cricket on the Pole 1st ed.(1982), 2nd ed. "Bulgarian Writer" Sofia (1984)
- On a boat to Ararat c/o Jusautor Sofia "Profizdat" (1985)
- Death in Lauderdale, Sofia, "Bulgarian Writer" (1989)
- In the fog–the Bulgarian and the sea Sofia "Letopisi", (1992)
- Hostage and fugitive bound nowhere, Publisher "Fatherland", (1997) ISBN 954-419-079-1
- Anthology-Bulgarian Marine Novelists, Varban Stamatov, Georgi Ingilizov, Emil Markov, Boris Aprilov, Atanas Stoichev, Jivko Angelov, Konstantin Ploshtakov, Kosta Radev, Nikola Radev, Peyu Bogdanov, Petar Kazalarski, Slavcho Chernishev, Tihomir Yordanov, Todor Velchev, Zvetan Minkov, Sofia University Publisher "St.Clement of Ochrid" (2002) ISBN 954-07-1706-X
