= Emiliya Dvoryanova =

Emiliya Dvoryanova (Bulgarian: Емилия Дворянова) (born 1958 in Sofia, Bulgaria) is a writer and musician. She graduated in piano performance at the National School of Music "Lyubomir Pipkov". She continued her studies at the Sofia University where she earned a doctorate degree in philosophy. At the moment she is associate professor in creative writing at the New Bulgarian University. Emiliya Dvoryanova is one of the most successful Contemporary Bulgarian Writers and some of her novels were translated in French.

== Works ==
Novels

- The House, Sofia: Areta Publishers, 1993;
- Passion, or the Death of Alice, Sofia: Obsidian Publishers, 1995; in French as "Passion ou las morte d'Alissa" traslsted by Marie Vrinat, editions federop 2006.
- La Velata, Sofia: Fenea Publishers, 1998;
- Mrs. G, Sofia: Fenea Publishers, 2001; second ed 2012; expected in French in 2012, traslstion by Marie Vrinat, editions aden.
- Virgin Mary's Earthly Gardens, Sofia: Obsidian Publishers, 2006; in French as "Les Jardins interdits" traslsted by Marie Vrinat, editions aden, 2010.
- Concerto for a Sentence—An Endeavor in the Musical-Erotic, Sofia: Obsidian Publishers, 2008. To be translated by Elitza Kotzeva and published in 2013 by Dalkey Archive Press.
- Beside Literature (Esseys), Sofia: Paradigma Publishers, 2011.

== Translations ==
Passion ou las morte d'Alissa traslsted by Marie Vrinat, editions federop 2006.

Les Jardins interdit traslsted by Marie Vrinat, editions aden, 2010.

Mme Gexpected in French in 2012, traslstion by Marie Vrinat, editions aden.

Concerto for a Sentence—An Endeavor in the Musical-Erotic, To be translated by Elitza Kotzeva and published in 2013 by Dalkey Archive Press.
