= Alexander Shpatov =

Bulgarian writer known for translated literary works

Alexander Shpatov (Bulgarian: Александър Шпатов) (born in 1985 in Sofia, Bulgaria) is a contemporary Bulgarian writer. He graduated from the American College of Sofia and the Sofia University Law School. His works have been translated into German and English.

== Books ==
Short story collections:

- Footnotes (2005), edited by Deyan Enev and published by Vesela Lyutzkanova Publishing House, awarded as the best fiction debut in the 34th Yuzhna Prolet National Literary Competition in 2006;
- Footnote Stories (2008), edited by Georgi Gospodinov and published by Janet 45. Nominated for the 2008 Helikon Book of the Year Award. Translated into German as Fussnotengeschichten (Wieser Verlag, 2010)
- Calendar of Stories (2011), published by Enthusiast Publishing House.
