= Nikolay Boykov =

Bulgarian writer

- Николай Бойков
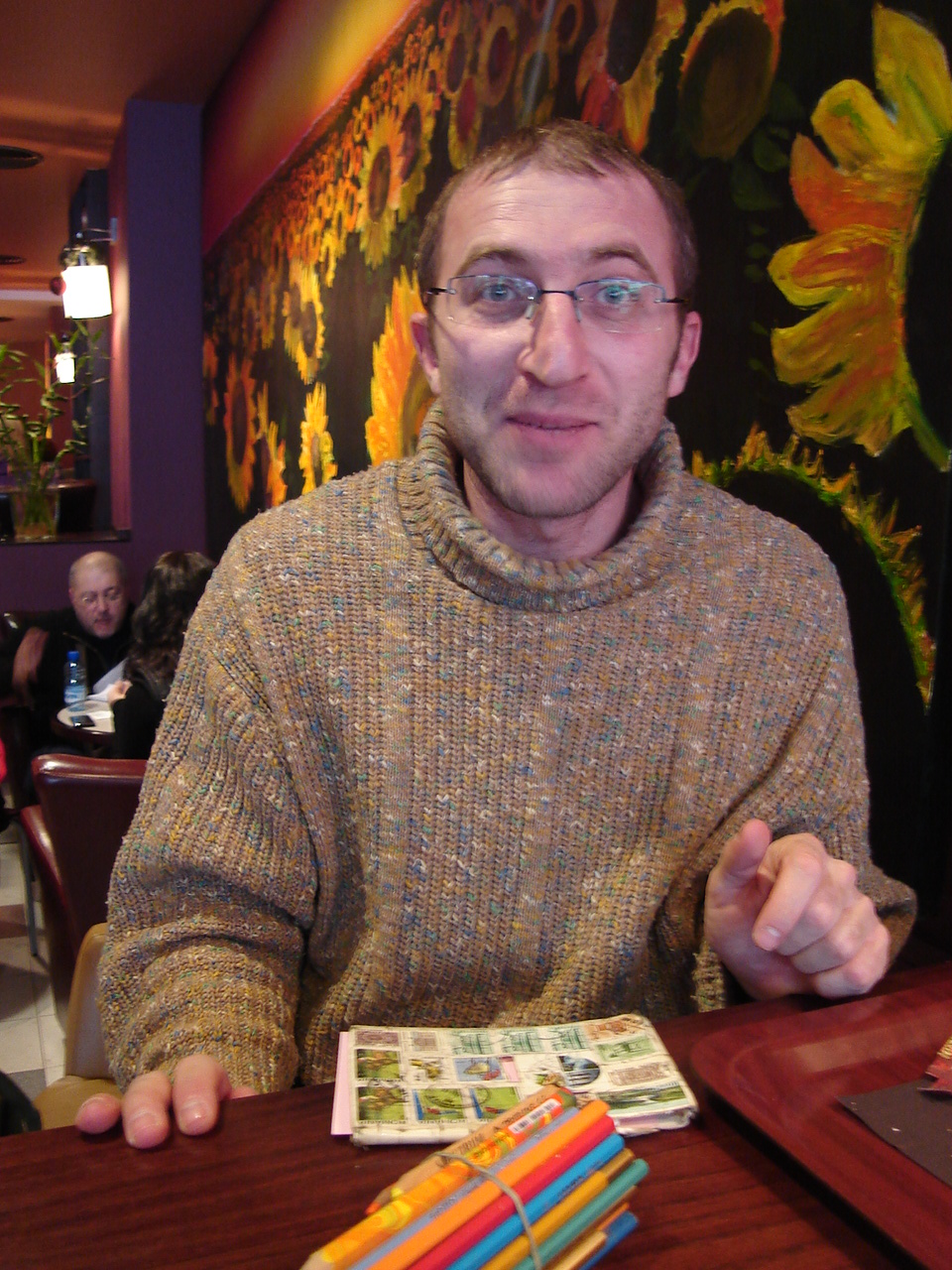
- Nikolay Boykov in 2008, Sofia
- Born: 26 January 1968 (age 58); Vidin, Bulgaria
- Education: University of Debrecen
- Occupations: Writer, translator, professor

Nikolay Boykov (Bulgarian: Николай Бойков) is a contemporary Bulgarian writer and literary translator from Hungary.

He was born on 26 January 1968 in Vidin, Bulgaria. In 1985, he graduated the Mathematical High School in Vidin and was accepted to study computer science in Sofia University. Later, after studying polytechnics for two semesters in Hungary, he moved to study Hungarian philology in the University of Debrecen, which he graduated in 1994.

From 1998 to 2005 he taught Hungarian language and literature in Sofia University.

== Books ==
- Metaphysics (Free Poetic Society, Sofia, 2000)
- Poems With Biography (Janet 45, Plovdiv, 2003)
- Declared in Love (handmade, Sofia, 2005)
- Letters To Petar (Janet 45, Plovdiv, 2006)
- The Book of Life (Ciela, Sofia, 2010)

== Selected translations ==
- Péter Esterházy, "The Glance of Countess Hahn-Hahn" (Hahn-Hahn grófnő pillantása) (published in Bulgarian by "SONM" in 2000)
- Ferenc Szijj, Kéregtorony (published in Bulgarian by "SONM" in 2002)
- Szilárd Borbély, Ami helyet (published in Bulgarian by "SONM" in 2002)
- Péter Nádas, "Own Death" (published in Bulgarian by "Altera" in 2011)[6]
- Imre Kertész, "The Union Jack" (Az angol lobogó) (published in Bulgarian by "Altera" in 2011)
- István Örkény, "One Minute Stories" (Válogatott egyperces novellák) (published in Bulgarian by "Janet 45" in 2012)

Boykov was editor and translator of the selection "Proses" by Miklós Mészöly (published in Bulgarian by "SONM" in 2003).

He has also translated works by András Gerevich, Nándor Gion, Gábor Németh, László Garaczi, László Villányi, Attila Bartis, Pál Békés, János Lackfi, János Pilinszky, László Darvasi, Tamás Jónás, György Petri, Lőrinc Szabó, Ottó Kiss, Attila Hazai, and others.
