= Mission London =

Mission London is a 2010 comedy film directed by Dimitar Mitovski and starring Alan Ford, Lee Nicholas Harris and Ralph Brown. It is based on the eponymous 2001 novel by Alek Popov. It is a co-production between Bulgaria, the United Kingdom, North Macedonia, Hungary, and Sweden.

== Plot ==
A concert to celebrate Bulgaria joining the EU is planned at the Embassy in London. Varadin, the new ambassador, is given the role of ensuring that the Queen attends. However a combination of corrupt staff, criminal gangs operating out of the kitchen, falling in love with a stripper and a little misunderstanding with a PR firm that provides look-alike royalties - the basic job turns into a chaotic nightmare.

== Cast ==
- Ralph Brown as Detective Collway
- Alan Ford as Sibling
- Nick Nevern as The Bodyguard
- Tomas Arana as Munroe
- Velizar Binev as Kamal
- Lee Nicholas Harris as Bodyguard
- Rosemary Leach as Miss Cunningham
- Georgi Staykov as Chavo
- Jonathan Ryland as Dale Rutherford
- Yulian Vergov as Varadin Dimitrov
- Atanas Srebrev as Narrator
- Malin Krastev as Racho
- Elizabeth Boag as News Reporter
- Johnny Lynch as Red Carpet Police Officer
- Sean Talo as Corps Diplomatique
- Meto Jovanovski as Macedonian ambassador
- Gino Picciano as Hospital Visitor
- Hristo Mitzkov as Expert
- J.D. Kelleher as Barry
- James Helder as News Crew Presenter
- Ana Papadopulu as Katya
- Lyubomir Neikov as Kosta Banicharov
- Teodora Andreeva Andrea (Bulgarian singer) as Russian Hitwoman
- Carla Rahal as Dotty
- Ernestina Chinova as Devorina Selyanska
- Stephen Leddington as Detective Sergeant
- Dennis Santucci as Close Protection Escort
- Orlin Goranov as President
- Silvia Dragoeva as Lara Croft Look-Alike
- Koceto Kalki as Koce Paunov
- Deborah Klayman as Reporter
- Kiril Psaltirov as Moma Dimich
- Jeremy Bennett as Director of Hyde Park
- Pavel Chernev as Batkata
