= Strega European Prize =

Annual literary award

- Native name: Premio Strega Europeo
- Sponsored by: Strega Alberti Benevento
- Country: Italy
- Status: Active

The Strega European Prize (Italian: Premio Strega Europeo) is an annual literary award given to a novel in Italian translation by a European author who has received national recognition in their home country. Established in 2014, it is administered—like the prestigious Strega Prize for Italian literature—by the Maria and Goffredo Bellonci Foundation and promoted in partnership with Strega Alberti Benevento and major organizations like the Salone Internazionale del Libro di Torino and the Circolo dei Lettori Foundation.

The award's primary criterion is that the five shortlisted works must have already received significant national recognition in their country of origin. The winner is traditionally announced and the prize awarded in Turin during the International Book Fair in May. It honors a single European author, with recent winners including Paul Murray (2025) for his novel Il giorno dell'ape.

== Winners ==
Year	Author	Original Title	Italian Title	Translator(s)	Language	Ref
2014	(Spain) Marcos Giralt Torrente	Tiempo de vida	Il tempo della vita	Pierpaolo Marchetti	Spanish	
2015	(Germany) Katja Petrowskaja	Vielleicht Esther	Forse Esther	Ada Vigliani	German	
2016	(France) Annie Ernaux	Les années	Gli anni	Lorenzo Flabbi	French	
2017	(Germany) Jenny Erpenbeck	Gehen, ging, gegangen	Voci del verbo andare	Ada Vigliani	German	
2018	(Spain) Fernando Aramburu	Patria	Patria	Bruno Arpaia	Spanish	
2019	(France) David Diop	Frère d’âme	Fratelli d’anima	Giovanni Bogliolo	French	
2020	(Germany) Judith Schalansky	Verzeichnis einiger Verluste	Inventario di alcune cose perdute	Flavia Pantanella	German	
2021	(Bulgaria) Georgi Gospodinov	Времеубежище	Cronorifugio	Giuseppe Dell'Agata	Bulgarian	
2022	(Russia) Mikhail Shishkin	Письмовник	Punto di Fuga	Emanuela Bonaccorsi	Russian	
2022	(Belgium) Amélie Nothomb	Premier sang	Primo sangue	Federica Di Lella	French	
2023	(France) Emmanuel Carrère	V13		Francesco Bergamasco	French	
2024	(France) Neige Sinno	Triste tigre		Luciana Cisbani	French	
2025	(Republic of Ireland) Paul Murray	The Bee Sting	Il giorno dell'ape	Tomasso Pincio	English	-
2026	(Argentina) Leila Guerriero	La llamada	La chiamata	Maria Nicola	Spanish	
