= Time Shelter =

2020 novel by Georgi Gospodinov

- English edition
- Author: Georgi Gospodinov
- Original title: Времеубежище
- Translator: Angela Rodel
- Language: Bulgarian
- Genre: Fiction
- Published: 2020 (Bulgarian); 2022 (English)
- Publisher: Janet 45 (Bulgaria); Weidenfeld & Nicolson (England); Liveright (US)
- Media type: Print, digital
- Pages: 304
- Awards: Man Booker International Prize; Strega European Prize
- ISBN: 9781474623087 (Weidenfeld & Nicolson)

Time Shelter (Bulgarian: Времеубежище, romanized: Vremeubezhishte) is a 2020 novel by Bulgarian author Georgi Gospodinov. In 2021, the Italian version of the novel, titled Cronorifugio and translated by Giuseppe Dell'Agata was awarded the Strega European Prize. In 2023, the English version of the novel, translated by Angela Rodel, became the first Bulgarian-language novel to both be nominated for and win the International Booker Prize. The £50,000 prize was equally shared between Gospodinov and Rodel.

== Plot ==
The novel follows an unnamed narrator and Gaustine, a psychiatrist who creates a clinic for people with Alzheimer's disease in Zürich. Each floor of the clinic recreates a decade in intricate detail, aiming to transport patients back in time to revisit their memories. Tasked with collecting past artifacts for the clinic, the narrator travels across countries. Soon, healthy people turn to the clinic to flee their monotonous lives and the idea becomes widespread when more clinics open. Referendums are held across Europe to decide which past decade each country should live in, in the future.

== Development ==
Time Shelter is Gospodinov's third novel to be published in English. In an interview with The Booker Prizes, Gospodinov revealed that his inspiration came from the rise of the populism movement in 2016, as well as Brexit, and that his writing was influenced by writers Thomas Mann and Jorge Luis Borges. Overall, the novel took nearly three years to write and around six months to be translated into English.

== Reception ==
=== Critical reception ===
In 2022, the novel was named as one of the best books of the year by The New Yorker magazine. Kirkus Reviews described Time Shelter as "an ambitious, quirky, time-folding yarn", while Nobel Prize winner Olga Tokarczuk described the novel as "the most exquisite kind of literature, on our perception of time and its passing, written in a masterful and totally unpredictable style". In its review, The Guardian commented "from communism to the Brexit referendum and conflict in Europe, this funny yet frightening Bulgarian novel explores the weaponisation of nostalgia". Sam Sacks, in The Wall Street Journal described the title of Georgi Gospodinov's novel “Time Shelter” to a sanatorium established in Switzerland for patients suffering from amnesia. The clinic functions like “a bomb shelter of the past”—each floor represents a different decade and is filled with the minutiae of the era (even its distinctive scents), allowing for full immersion in a cherished period of history.

=== Awards and accolades ===
In 2021, the Italian translation of Time Shelter was awarded the Strega European Prize, Italy's most prestigious literary award. The win marked the first time that the award was given to an Eastern European writer.

In 2023, the English translation of the novel was awarded the International Booker Prize. It is the first Bulgarian novel to win the prize. Leïla Slimani, the chairwoman of the judging panel, described the novel as "a brilliant novel, full of irony and melancholy." The novel was ultimately chosen from a shortlist of six books. On winning the prize, author Gospodinov commented, "it is commonly assumed that 'big themes' are reserved for 'big literatures,' or literatures written in big languages, while small languages, somehow by default, are left with the local and the exotic. Awards like the International Booker Prize are changing that status quo, and this is very important."
