= Petar Stapov =

Bulgarian writer (1910–1992)

Petar Ivanov Stapov
- Петър Иванов Стъпов
- Born: July 25, 1910; Eski Cuma
- Died: January 18, 1992 (aged 81); Sofia
- Years active: 1928-1992

Petar Ivanov Stapov (Bulgarian: Петър Иванов Стъпов; July 25, 1910 – January 18, 1992) was a Bulgarian writer, poet, teacher, librarian, cultural activist, and editor of literary periodical publications. He was one of the founders of the Union of Bulgarian Writers and writer for the National Theater for the Village. He wrote historical novels, novellas, short stories, and other novels.

== Biography ==
Stapov was born on 25 July 1910 in Eski Cuma where he received his primary and lower secondary education. In 1925 he entered the Pedagogical School in Shumen. Two of his poems appeared in 1928 in the "Globe" (Sofia).

After his graduation in 1930 he worked as an elementary school teacher in his home district. Between December 15, 1930, and February 20, 1942, he was working at the "Напредък" as librarian and director of amateur theatrical troupe, and edited local papers: "Обществена трибуна", "Нови дни", "Хоризонт", "Напредък", "Подем" and others. He was elected to the board of the Union of Writers of the province on March 3, 1934. In 1936 Stapov became secretary at the district community center in Targovishte. In June 1945 he became Chief Editor of the newspaper "Септемврийче", a post he held on to until January 1950. 1946/47 he was editor of literary newspaper "Лост" and "Стожер". From 15 February 1951 to January 1953 he worked as a playwright at the National City Theatre in Sofia. In the years 1954 to 1957 he was Secretary of the department "Children writers" of the Bulgarian Writers' Union. In 1957 he was one of the founders and until 1971 the assistant chief editor of the journal "Картинна галерия". He retired in 1972. In 1973 he became a member of the National Committee for Sobriety

He died in Sofia on January 18, 1992.

== Bibliography ==
- "Знаменосецът" (1942) – biographical novel
- "Врагове" (1947) – novel
- "Ятакът" (1951) – novel
- "Кръжок" (1956) – novel
- "Най-скъпото" (1957) – short stories
- "Тайната на кораба Пирин" (1956) – novel
- "Гласове от вековете" (1958) – novella
- "Дядо Иван иде..." (1958) – short stories
- "Живот с надежда" (1962) – novel
- "Чисти очи" (1962) – short stories
- "Човекът от трамвая" (1964) – short stories
- "Гости от Мион" (1965) – novel
- "Пътешествието на Ани" (1965) – story
- "Среща с непозната" (1965) – short stories
- "Ятакът" (1966) – novel
- "Златният пръстен" (1969) – novella
- "Семир се завръща" (1969) – novel
- "Арестуваната камбана" (1970) – short stories
- "Момчето от отряда" (1970) – novellas and short stories
- "Слънце над Шипка" (1970) – novellas and short stories
- "Когато бяхме изобретатели" (1973) – short stories
- "Голямото богатство" (1975) – anthology
- "Ело справедливия" (1975) – novel
- "На оръжия, братя" (1976) – historical short stories
- "Това упорито момче"(1976) – novel
- "Барабанът" (1978) – short stories
- "Всички на оръжие" (1978) – novella
- "Георги Данчов зографина" (1979) – novel
- "Мечът с червения рубин" (1981) – novel
- "Крилатият войвода" (1982) – short story
- "Кога ще порастна?" (1983) – tales
- "Шепа злато" (1984) – novella
- "Моите верни приятели" (1986) – short stories
- "Приключенията на Мечо, Лиса и Вълчо" (1986) – short story
- "В зимната нощ" (1991) – novella

=== Pseudonyms ===
Throughout his writing career Stapov used a variety of names:

Петър С., Петя Митин, П. Митин, Владимир Петров, Петис, Пивас, Пиедо, Труч, Репортер No.3, Ра-Ра, Перотон, Спектър, Човек, Ганг Цо Лин, Петър Ноев, Антей, П. Джумалиев
