= Tsoncho Rodev =

Bulgarian historical novelist

Tsoncho Hristov Rodev (June 9, 1926 – 2011) was a Bulgarian historical novelist. He is author of historical and adventure novels, as well as essays and short stories.

== Biography ==
He was born in Provadia on June 9, 1926. His father Hristo Ts. Rodev (1880–1944) was a lawyer, deputy in the XXIII National Assembly, who was killed after 1944 Bulgarian coup d'état. Tsoncho Rodev completed primary education in his hometown and secondary school in Varna, then high education, studying Law at Sofia University. Не devoted himself to literary activity and created a number of historical and adventure novels as well as short stories for children and adolescents.

Honorary citizen of Provadia and Sliven (1998). Winner of the Award of the Municipality of Sliven for literature and art "Dobri Chintulov" (1998), the Award for local lore "Dr. Ivan Seliminski" (1995), the Honorary Badge "For Civic Contribution" (2006).

== Bibliography ==
- The Black Horseman (1966, 1978) – an adventure novel
- The Treasure of Lysimachus (1966) – a collection of short stories and short stories
- The Trial (1969) – a historical novel
- They Called Me the Iron Hand (1975, 1975) – a historical novel
- Svetoslav Terter (1971) – a biographical historical novel
- Echoes (1971) – a collection of short stories
- "The Cave of Ghosts" (1972) – a short story
- The Man Without a Shadow (1976)
- The Sword of the Uncompromising (1981) – a historical novel
- The Avengers (1983) – a collection of short stories
- "Beyond the Blue Threshold" (1985) – essay
- Rumble (1980) – a historical novel
- The Storm (1986) – a historical novel
- Two Against Hell (1986) – a historical novel
- The Pirate (With a Black Lion on a Mast) (1994) – a historical novel
- "A bag of keys" (1994) – 12 stories and short stories on real cases about the dignity of the Bulgarian person
- And it was day (1998, 2016 second edition) – a historical novel
