= Svetla Damyanovska =

Bulgarian writer

Svetla Damyanovska (Bulgarian: Светла Дамяновска) is a Bulgarian writer. She is an author of six books of poetry and two fiction books and a member of the Union of the Bulgarian writers.
