= Kosta Todorov =

Bulgarian conductor

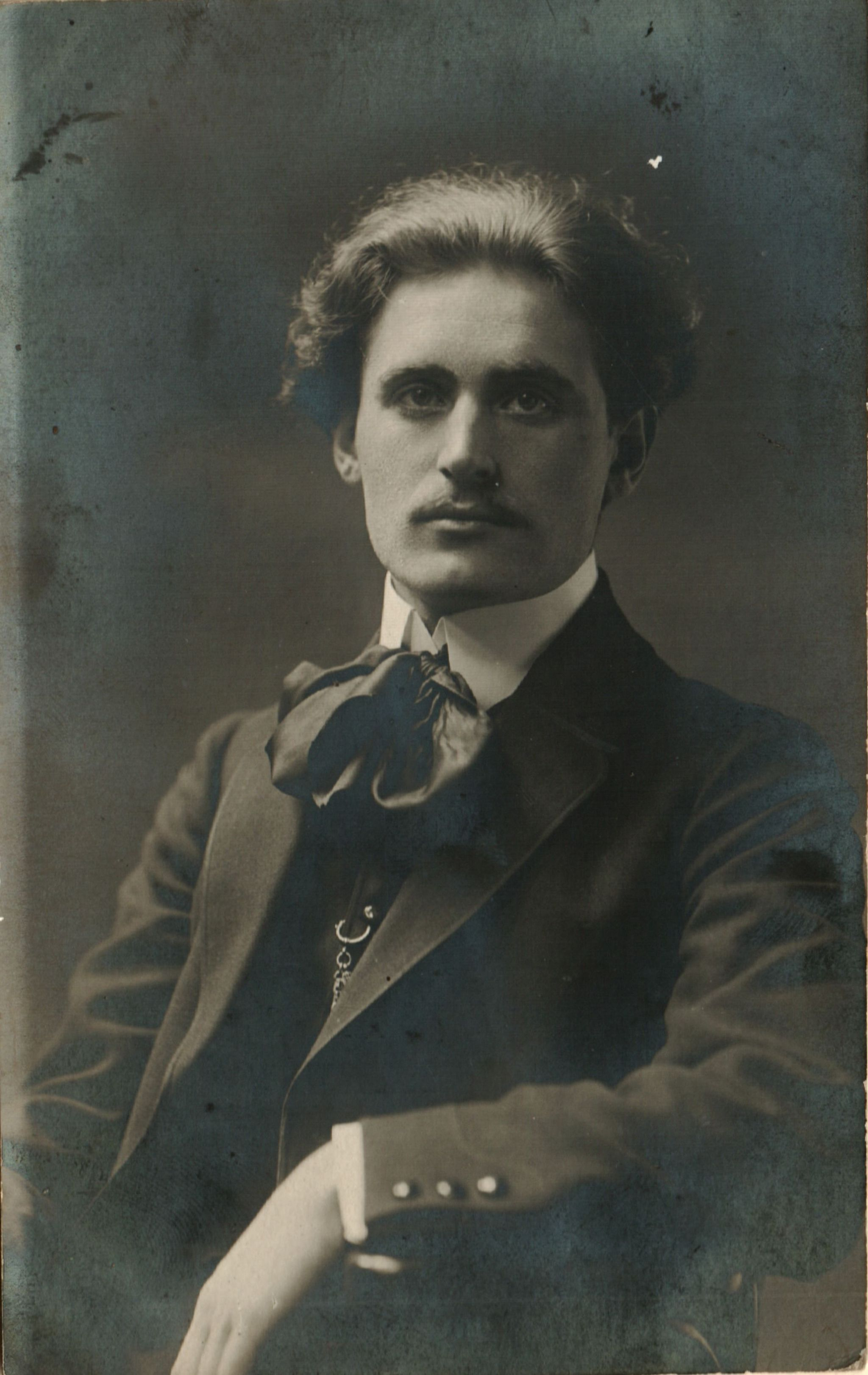
Portrait photo, 1910. Source: Bulgarian Archives State Agency

Kosta Todorov (Bulgarian: Коста Тодоров) was a Bulgarian conductor, music pedagogue, and creator of the Varna Symphonic Association.

== Biography ==
Todorov was born in 1886 in Varna, Bulgaria. He completed his secondary education in Varna Male Gymnasium, and later studied philosophy and music in Würzburg. After his return to Bulgaria, he became a music pedagogue in the male gymnasium. In 1912, he created the Varna Symphonic Association, and on June 2, its first concert was carried out in which took part solo singers, a male choir, a mixed choir, and a symphonic orchestra conducted by Victor Gutt, Yurdan Todorov and himself.

In 1914, Kosta Todorov established the first string quartet in Varna. During the First World War, together with Mihail Nikolov and Krum Malev organize operetta performances with the students from the Varna schools and the Orchestra of the Male Gymnasium.

Todorov died in 1947.
