= Pavel Tsvetkov =

Bulgarian poet and writer

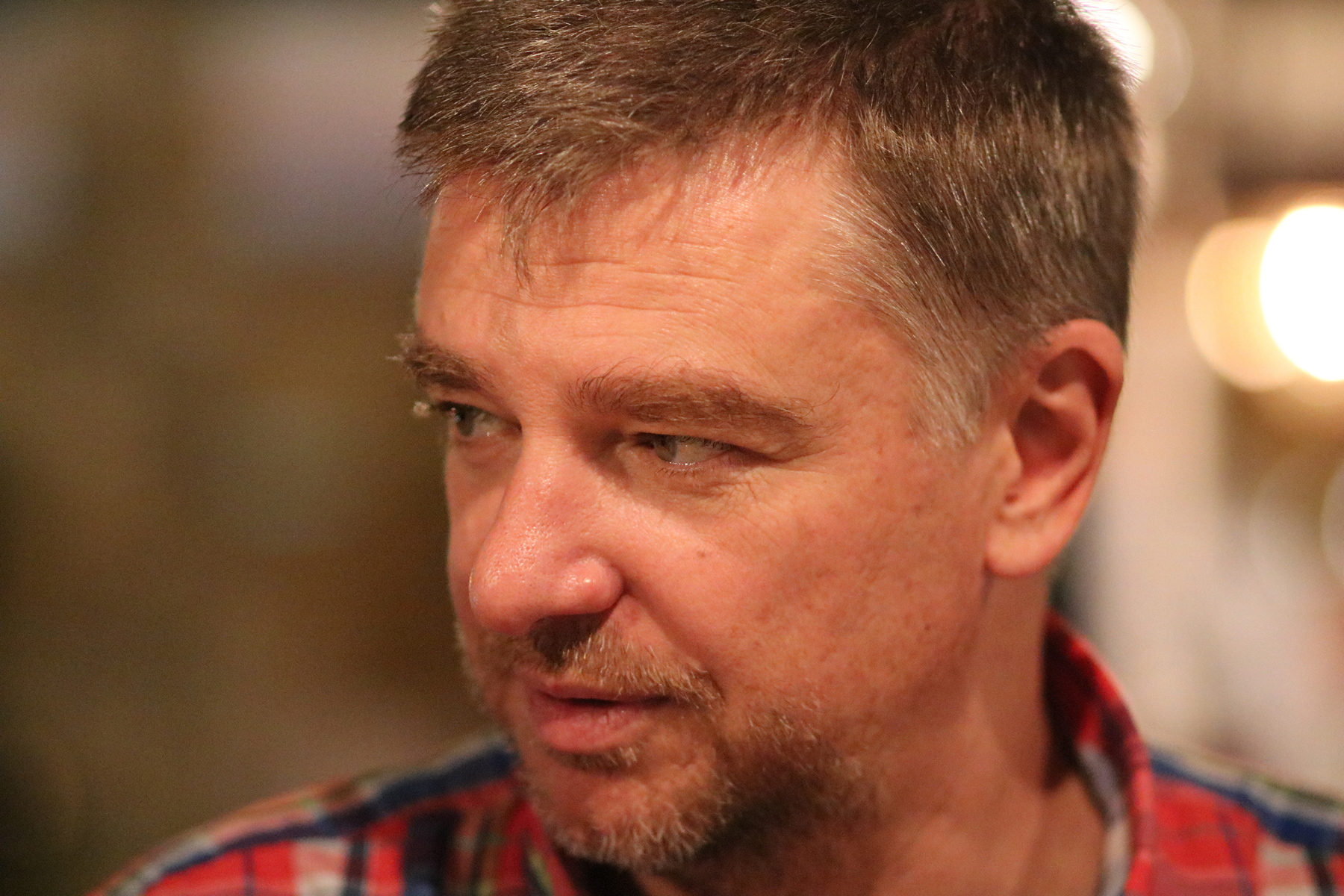
- Born: March 23, 1971 (age 55); Silistra, Bulgaria
- Occupations: Poet, writer

Pavel Chavdarov Tsvetkov (Bulgarian: Павел Чавдаров Цветков; born March 23, 1971) is a Bulgarian poet and writer, best known for his Desperate Love poetry collection and the essay "Exules Suo Voluntate: Roots and Fruits of Bulgarian National Nihilism".

== Life ==
Pavel Tsvetkov was born in the town of Silistra on March 23, 1971. He has a Master’s Degree in Bulgarian Philology with a Minor in English Language and Literature (1995) from Sofia University St. Kliment Ohridski and a Master’s Degree in Public Relations (2006) from Varna Free University Chernorizets Hrabar. He has spent most of his later life in Varna (Bulgaria), where he works as a freelance translator and videographer.

== Awards ==
- Grand Prize, "Andrei Germanov" Poetry Contest (2007) – nominations by Anton Donchev, Georgi Konstantinov, Ivan Granitski and Panko Anchev (Members of the Jury);
- Second Prize (first prize was not awarded in 2003) from the National Essay Contest "The unpublished book on Bulgarian Renaissance Teachers and Revolutionaries" (2003), organized by the National Palace of Culture (Sofia) and "TRUD" Publishing House – the prize was conferred by a Jury headed by Bulgarian novelist Anton Donchev (the winning text "Exules Suo Voluntate: roots and fruits of Bulgarian national nihilism" Bulgarian: "Exules Suo Voluntate: корени и плодове на българския национален нихилизъм") was published in the collection of essays "The unpublished book on Bulgarian Renaissance Teachers and Revolutionaries", ISBN 954-528-377-7);
- Grand Prize, "The Love We Could Not Live Without" Poetry Contest (2001) – nominations by Evtim Evtimov (Chairman of the Jury). The winning text "Let us Hide Our Love" and the poem "The Train" were published in the poetry collection The Love We Could Not Live Without", ISBN 954-579-146-2.

== Publications ==
Creative Writing

- Desperate Love (Bulgarian: Отчаяна любов), 2006, ISBN 954-715-280-7.
- The composition "Български сонет" [Bulgarian Sonnet] was included in the poetry collection "Светът е за двама. Шедьоври на любовния сонет" ["The World is Meant for Two. Masterpieces of the Love Sonnet"], published by Perseus Publishing House, 2008, ISBN 978-954-9420-78-4.
