= Kalin Iliev =

- Born: 1956 (age 69–70); Gabrovo, Bulgaria
- Occupations: Writer, dramatist, publicist
- Website: kaliniliev.net; springemigrants.com/index-en.html

Kalin Iliev (Bulgarian: Калин Илиев) is a Bulgarian writer, dramatist and publicist. The author of over 20 plays, he has also written The Last Postman (2006) and The Spring of the Emigrants (2013). He has had more than 30 publications and productions of his plays on the stages of Bulgarian theatres

== Recognition ==
Iliev has won Bulgarian and International literary awards. He is a member of the Society of Dramatic Authors and Composers.

== Literature ==
- The Last Postmen - novel
- Story of the Mixed-Up Kingdom
- Spring of Immigrants - novel
- Spring of Immigrants. Morpho - novel,

== Dramaturgy ==
- Maximum
- Dead Sea
- The Hunter
- The Big Mama
- The Ball of the Snakes
- The Border ISBN 385-435-47-2X,
- The Key
- The Bed-wetter
- A Fairy Tale About the End
- The Brothel

== Cinema and video ==
- The Border - Paris, France
- The Bed Wetter
- A Fairy Tale About the End
- The Key
- A Fairy Tale about the Incoherent Kingdom
- A Fairy Tale About the End (Romania)
- The Border (Kyiv, Ukraine)
- The Border (Glasgow, UK)
- The Big Mama (Pernik, Bulgaria)

== Reviews ==
- Publication of Letter the performance - magazine - France Review ART-SCENE
- The Border - Theatre 14 (Paris) July 2009
- The Last Postman - Janet 45
- International Theatre Research Magazine Oxford University, summer 2002 by ph.d Svetlana Pancheva
- Poveste despre sfarsitul lumii
- Story of the Mixed-Up Kingdom - annotation
- У КИЄВІ ПРЕДСТАВИЛИ УКРАЇНСЬКО-БОЛГАРСЬКУ ВИСТАВУ «МАМО, ДЕ ТИ?» (ВСЕ ЗА ФРЕЙДОМ) - annotation
- У столичному Колесі болгарський режисер поставив драму земляка - annotation
