= Fani Popova-Mutafova =

Bulgarian writer

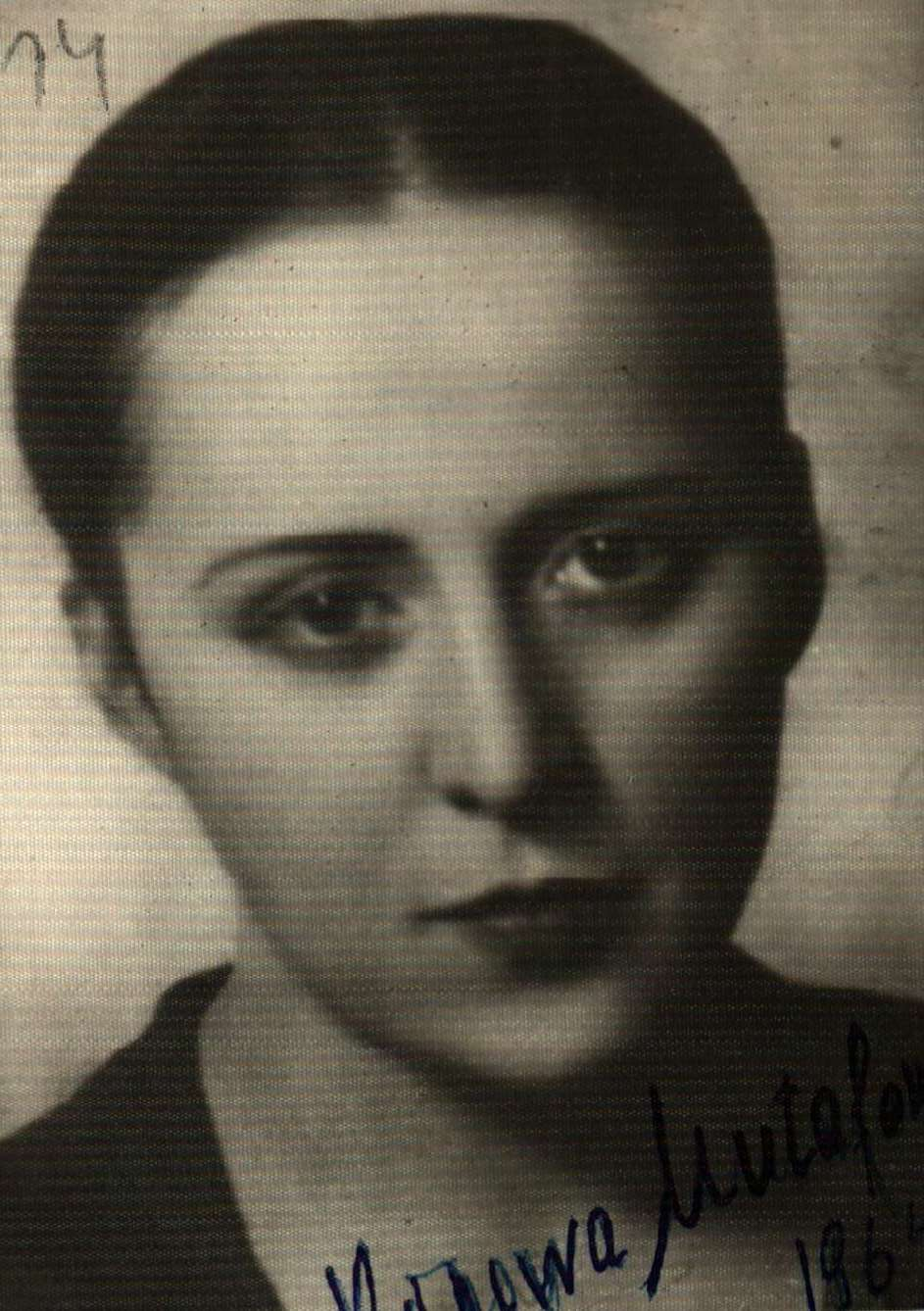
Fani Popova–Mutafova

Fani Popova–Mutafova (Bulgarian: Фани Попова-Мутафова; October 16, 1902 – July 9, 1977) was a Bulgarian author who is considered by many to have been the best-selling Bulgarian historical fiction author ever.

== Biography ==
The daughter of Dobry Popov, an officer in the Bulgarian army, she was born in Sevlievo and was educated there, in Sofia and in Turin, Italy, where she also studied piano music. From 1922 to 1925, she studied music in Germany. She first published her work in the journals Vestnik na Zenata, Bulgarska misul and Zlatorog.

Her books sold in record numbers in the 1930s and the early 1940s. In 1936 she took part in the foundation of the Ratniks and was considered one of their main ideologists.

Popova–Mutafova joined the European Writers' League (Europäische Schriftstellervereinigung), which was founded by Joseph Goebbels in 1941/42.

She was eventually sentenced to seven years of imprisonment by the Bulgarian communist regime because of her writings (her alleged "pro-German allegiance"), and though released after only eleven months for health reasons (asthma), was forbidden to publish anything between 1943 and 1972. She translated books and plays from Italian for a living then.

She was married to another Bulgarian writer, Chavdar Mutafov.

Popova-Mutafova died in Sofia at the age of 74.

== Selected works ==
- Солунският чудотворец, historical novel (1929–30)
- Недялка Стаматова (1933)
- Дъщерята на Калояна (Kaloyan's daughter), historical novel (1936)
- Иван Асен II (Ivan Asen II of Bulgaria), historical novel (1936)
- Д-р П. Берон (Doctor Petar Beron, historical novel (1972)

== Other ==
- "A Woman" in Virginia's Sisters: An Anthology of Women's Writing, 2023 (trans. Petya Pavlova)
