= Zdravka Evtimova =

- Born: July 24, 1959 (age 67) (Bulgaria) Pernik
- Occupation: Writer

Zdravka Evtimova (Bulgarian: Здравка Евтимова) (born 24 July 1959 in Pernik, Bulgaria) is a contemporary Bulgarian writer. She has four short story collections and four novels published in Bulgarian. Her short stories have appeared in many international literary journals. Some of her short story collections were translated into other languages. As well as being an author, Zdravka works as a literary translator from English, French and German.

Zdravka Evtimova has translated more than 25 novels by English, American and Canadian authors into Bulgarian language. She translates the work of Bulgarian writers into English and is a member of the Bulgarian Writers' Union and the Writers' League in UK, Yorkshire-Humberside region. She is a member of the Bulgarian PEN-Club.

== Books ==
A partial list of short story collections and novels by Zdravka Evtimova published outside Bulgaria:

- Bitter Sky, Skrev Press, UK, 2003
- Somebody Else, MAG Press, USA, 2004
- God of Traitors, Books for a Buck Press, USA, 2006
- Miss Daniella, Skrev Press, UK, 2007
- Good Figure, Beautiful Voice, Astemari Publishers, USA, 2008
- Pale and Other Bulgarian Stories, Vox Humana Publishes, Israel/Canada, 2010
- Carts and Other Stories, Fomite Press, USA, 2012
- Time to Mow and Other Stories, All Things That matter Press, USA, 2012
- Impossibly Blue, Skrev Press, UK, 2013
- Endless July, Paraxenes Meres, Greece, 2013
- Wrong and Other Stories, short story collection, Tiktakti Press, Israel, 2014
- Sinfonia Bulgarica novel, Fomite Books, USA, 2014
- Sinfonia, novel, Besa Editrice, Italy, 2015
- Thursday, novel, Arts and Literature Publishing, China, 2016
- Thursday, novel, Antolog Publishing, Macedonia, 2016
- Thursday, novel, Vaslaar Books, Serbia, 2016
- In the Town of Joy and Peace, novel, Fomite Press, USA, 2017
- Parable of Stones & Other Stories, short story collection, All Things That Matter Press, USA, 2017
- Lo Stesso Fiume, novel (the title in English is The Same River) Besa Editrice, Italy, 2017
- He May Wear My Silence, novel, Starship Sloane Publishing, USA, 2023
- The Strangest of Stories: A Collection of the Weird and Surreal, short story collection, Starship Sloane Publishing, USA, 2026
