= Peycho Kanev =

Bulgarian writer

- Born: Peycho Kanev; 14 November 1980; Silistra, Bulgaria
- Occupation: poet / writer / translator

Peycho Kanev (Bulgarian: Пейчо Кънев) is a poet, writer, and translator born in Silistra, Bulgaria.

== Publications ==
Kanev's works have been published in many literary journals. His poems appeared in many literary magazines, including Poetry Quarterly, Evergreen Review, Cordite Poetry Review, Sheepshead Review, Off the Coast, JMWW, The Coachella Review, Mascara Literary Review, The Mayo Review, Two Thirds North, Sierra Nevada Review, and The Cleveland Review, among many others.

He is the author of multiple poetry collections, chapbooks, and has participated in collaborative books.

In 2009, Kanev published his first book.. There were two books published in 2009, one by the American micropress Please Press and one by the Bulgarian publisher Ciela. The book published by Please Press was r, a discursive poetry book with writing by Kanev and Felino A. Soriano and visual art by Duane Locke. The book published by Ciela Soft and Publishing was Разходка през стените.

In 2010 Kanev published two books. Desperate, NY released Bone Silence', which was edited by Edward Wells of please press. Kanev's Американски тетрадки (American Notebooks) was published by Ciela in Bulgaria.

In 2013 Peycho Kanev continued his schedule of publishing two books, one in the United States of America and one in Bulgaria. This year marked the return of Kanev to please press, this time contributing to the discursive book project, thrw: 3 | w, which included poetry by Felino A. Soriano and prose by Steve Calamars. In Bulgaria, Kanev's book Уиски в тенекиена кутия (Whiskey in a Tin Can) was published by Janet-45 Print and Publishing.

In 2015 Peycho Kanev released his next book, the poetry collection Живо месо (Raw Meat). It was published by the poetry publishing house Da in Bulgaria.
