= Krassimir Damianov =

Krassimir Damianov (Bulgarian: Красимир Дамянов; 25 March 1948, in Sofia, Bulgaria – 11 January 2015, in Barcelona, Spain) was a Bulgarian writer and civil engineer. Among the projects he worked on are the Asparuhov Bridge construction, The National Institute for Cultural Monuments, The Bulgarian Writer's Publishing House, and the Boyana Cinema Studio; he also worked as a taxicab driver in Sofia. Damianov moved to Spain in 1990, where he was the owner and manager of the Cultural Society Arthostal in Barcelona.

== Books ==
- Why There Is No God (1981);
- Devil's Nail (1985);
- Tales for Children who Don't Want to Eat (1989);
- Diary of a Butterfly (2008);
- The House of the Hanged (2009).
