= Galin Nikiforov =

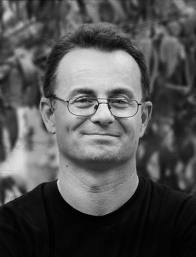
Galin Nikiforov

Galin Nikiforov (Bulgarian: Галин Никифоров) is a contemporary Bulgarian writer. He was born in 1968 and lives in Dobrich, Bulgaria. He graduated from the Technical University of Plovdiv and the University of Economics Varna. He has worked as an engineer in the industry since 1993. He is married and has a daughter. In 2011 his book Losers Summer' won the biggest literature competition in the country - "Novel of the Year". A month later his latest novel The House of Clowns won the Elias Canetti Award.

== Novels ==
- Последната истина (The Last Truth, 1998)
- Умерено нежно (Fairly Gently, 2003)
- Добро момче (Good Guy, 2006)
- Фотографът: Obscura Reperta (The Photographer: Obscura Reperta, 2009)
- Лятото на неудачниците (Losers' Summer, 2010)
- Къщата на клоуните (The House of Clowns, 2011)
- Лисицата, София, Сиела, 2014, роман, 558 с.
- Тяло под роклята, София, Сиела, 2018, роман, 244 с.
- Лисицата, София, Сиела, 2019, роман, второ преработено издание, 484 с.
