= Zachary Karabashliev =

Bulgarian writer and playwright

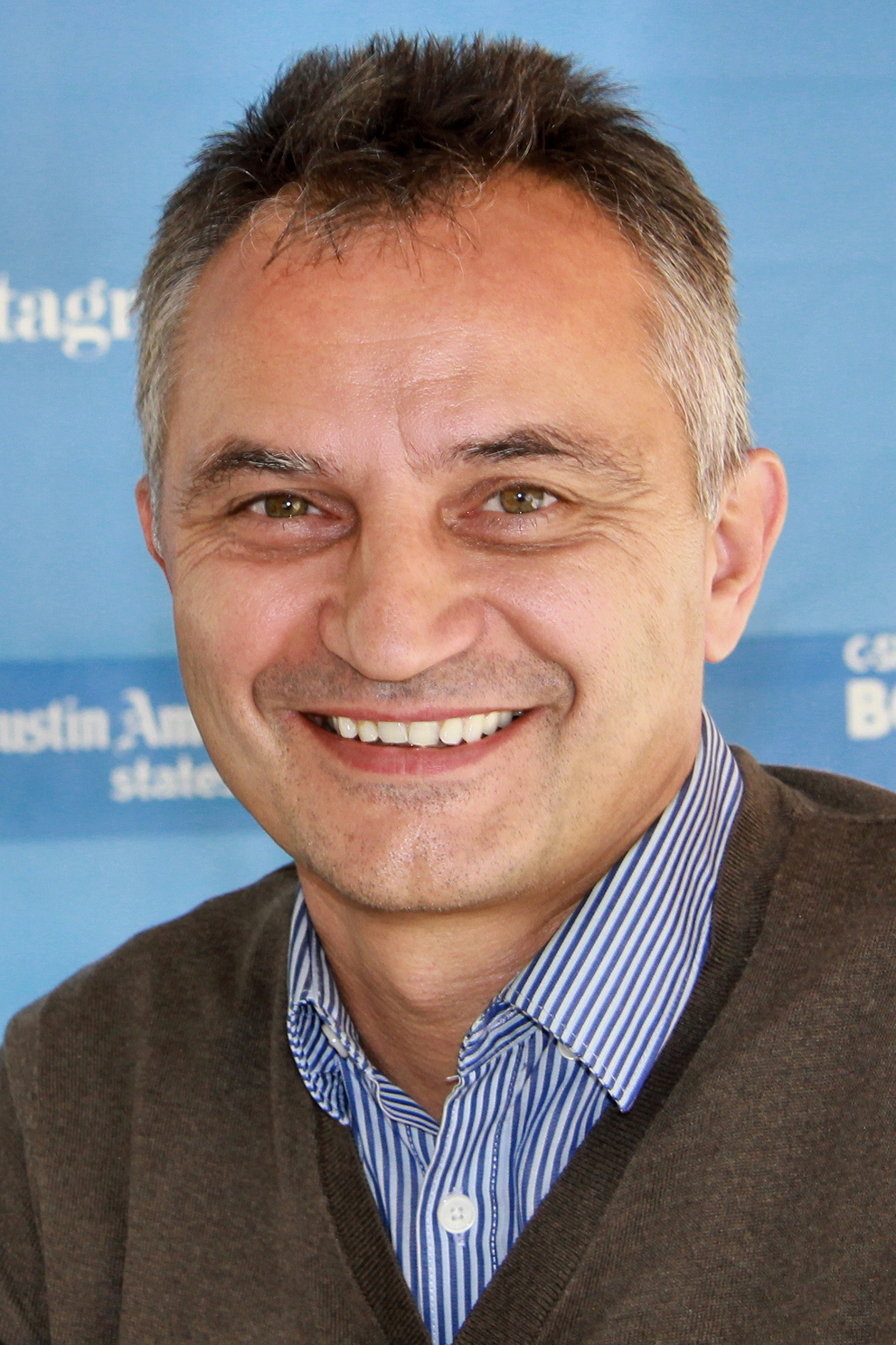
- Zachary Karabashliev at the 2013 Texas Book Festival.
- Born: 14 April 1968 (age 58); Varna, Bulgaria
- Education: Shumen University
- Writing career
- Genre: novel

Zachary Karabashliev (Bulgarian: Захари Карабашлиев) (born 14 April 1968, Varna, Bulgaria) is a contemporary Bulgarian writer and a playwright. He is the author of novels, short stories and screenplays, which have been adapted into movies and plays in Bulgaria and internationally.

== Life ==
He graduated in Bulgarian philology from the Shumen University, Bulgaria. In 1997, he moved to the USA with his family in San Diego, California, U.S.

In 2014 he moved to Sofia, Bulgaria and became the Editor-in-chief of the major publishing house Ciela.

His debut novel "18% Gray" (Ciela 2008) is a bestselling title in Bulgaria, later published in the United States, France, Poland, Croatia, Slovakia, Macedonia and other countries. Awards included: Novel of the Year 2008 Award given by VIC Foundation The Flower of Helikon Award; I was chosen by anonymous TV vote to be among the 100 most loved books by Bulgarians in the BBC-format campaign "The Big Read" on Bulgarian National Television.

His short stories included in the collections "A Brief History of the Airplane" (Ciela, 2009) and "Symmetry" (Ciela 2011) are translated and published in English, German, French, Russian, Persian, Turkish, and many other languages. The short story collection "

"A Brief History of the Airplane" was awarded Helikon Award in 2009.

His stage plays produced in Bulgaria, and the US have won numerous prestigious awards.

"Lissabon" - 2014 - La Mama Theatre in New York City, produced by Voza Rivers, directed by Hristo Hristov. "Sunday Evening" - 2008 Askeer Award, produced by Theatre Sofia, directed by Zdravko Mitkov. "Recoil" - 2009 Askeer Nominee, The Audience Award at Wiesbadden Theatre Fest, TBA, directed by Stayko Murdjev.

Zachary Karabashliev wrote the screenplay for the feature "18% Gray", as well as other feature and short films in various stages of production.

"Havra" (Ciela 2017) is a 193 000-word novel, published in his native Bulgaria to become a national bestseller. A vivid historical tale, within the frame of a contemporary drama, "Havra" offers an astonishing quest for truth, justice, love and family that stretches from 19th century Russia, sweeps through Central Asia, Ottoman Empire, Victorian England, Spain, France to reach a surfer's beach town in Southern California, and climaxes in contemporary post-communist Bulgaria.

"Havra" was awarded the two most prestigious national literary Awards: Novel of the Year 2017 given by National Endowment Fund "13 Centuries of Bulgaria"; H.G. Danov, given by the Bulgarian Ministry of Culture; Foundation Comunittas Award for literature; Nomination for "Elias Canetti Foundation" Award (results in November 2019)

His short story Metastases was included in the American collection "Best European Fiction 2018" by Dalkey Archive Press.

In 2018 his novella "Thurst" is published by Ciela, and nominated for "Elias Canetti Foundation" Award.

Zachary Karabashliev also writes short stories, essays and articles for lifestyle magazines, literary journals and newspapers.

In 2017 he co-founded the International Literary festival "VarnaLit" connecting literacy, storytelling and education. International guests of the festival included Stefan Pastis (US), A.J. Fin (US), Thomas Macgonigle(US), Narine Abgarian (Armenia), Dmitry Glukhovsky (Russia), Jerome Ferarri (France), Sally Green (UK), and many others.

Zachary Karabashliev lives in Sofia with his wife Vera and his daughters.
