= Sevda Sevan =

Ambassador of Armenia to Bulgaria
- In office 1994–2005
- President: Levon Ter-Petrossian Robert Kocharyan
- Preceded by: Office created
- Succeeded by: Sergey Manassarian

Personal details
- Born: November 6, 1945 Nova Zagora
- Died: May 16, 2009 (aged 63) Sofia
- Spouse: Varban Stamatov
- Profession: writer and diplomat

Sevda Sevan (Armenian: Սևդա Սևան; November 6, 1945 – May 16, 2009) was a prominent Armenian-Bulgarian writer, the Ambassador of Armenia in Bulgaria from 1994 to 2005. Sevda Sevan was the third wife of Bulgarian writer and editor Varban Stamatov.

Journal "Novinar", 17.04.2008, Sofia, Interview with author Sevda Sevan, "I am ashamed that our Parliament doesn’t recognize the Armenian genocide".

When asked by Aglika Georgieva, who was her teacher in the art of writing, Sevda replied: "I had the best teacher – my husband, the writer and great editor Varban Stamatov. Up to the first 30 pages he guided me gently but firmly – not scribbling all over my manuscript, but suggesting to me – that "prose has to be muscular, it has to be alive, thriving, to be aromatic. Strain yourself, try to remember the smells" (of early childhood), he used to say to me. So probably those aromas had been just there in my subconscious, because effortlessly, they started arriving."

== Books ==
- Rodosto, Rodosto
