= Vladimir Lukov =

Bulgarian poet (born 1949)

- Born: 2 June 1949 (age 77) village Tsenovo, Ruse Province
- Occupations: Poet and teacher

Vladimir Lukov (Bulgarian: Владимир Луков; born 2 June 1949) is a Bulgarian poet. He is a descendant of the repatriated family Tsipas Greek Macedonia, Agios Pandeleimon near Florina. He graduated with the specialties of Geography and Philosophy from Sofia University "St. Kliment Ohridski". Since 1969 he has published poetry. His poems have been released in many Bulgarian and Macedonian literary magazines and anthologies. He has written the books "The man with prostheses"(1992), "The scout"(1993), "Ungodly incarnations" (1999), "A gorge" (2001), " Checking of the senses" (2005), "Providence" (Skopie, 2006 library Balkan writers), "Traces of wind" (2007) and "Fibres of infinity"(2011). Bulgarian literary criticism defines Vladimir Lukov’s poetry as philosophical and enigmatic. The poet is a member of the Union of the free writers in Bulgaria.
