= Vladimir Zarev =

Vladimir Zarev (Bulgarian: Владимир Зарев) (born 1947 in Sofia) is a contemporary Bulgarian novelist.

He studied Bulgarian Philology at Sofia University and made his debut in 1972 with the short novel Riot of Emotions. To date Zarev has published 10 novels, several volumes of short stories, a poetry book, and two non-fiction books. Several of his works have been translated to Russian, German and English. Zarev received acclaim through his novel Decay (first published in 2003, and translated to German in 2007) which describes the transformation of Bulgarian society during the county's political transition of the 1990s. Critics have praised the work as an important contribution to explaining the prevailing lawlessness and corruption in post-communist Bulgaria.

Zarev is the editor of the quarterly literary magazine Savremennik ('Contemporary'), which he preserved from closure during the 1990s.

== Bibliography ==
- The Being
- The Exit
- The Choice
- The Day of Impatience
- The Greyhound
- Year 1850
- Priest Bogomil and the Perfection of Fear (Pop Bogomil I Suvurshenstvoto Na Strakha)
- Worlds (Svetove)
- Decay (Razrukha)
- The Monster (Chudovishteto)
- Lost in Freedom (Oburkani v svobodata)
- Eagles' Bridge (Orlov most)
