= Evgueniy Alexiev =

French operatic baritone

Evgueniy Alexiev (born May 5, 1967, in Bulgaria) is a French operatic baritone. He has lived in Bordeaux since 1992.

== Career ==
In February 1993, Alexiev was invited to the Opera of Marseille, for a concert with the Association Del Monaco, and to the Opera of Avignon by Raymond Duffaut, for an event showcasing young singers. In the same year, he won the opera's first prize at the competition of the Alès and was a finalist in a competition by the Syndical Chamber of the Directors of French Opera Theatres. He was recognised by Antoine Bourseiller, who hired him in the production of Don Giovanni; he also played Don Basilio with Jean-Claude Malgoire, in The Barber of Seville.

In 1995, he studied at the Centre of Formation for Opera of the National Opera of Paris, and was a finalist in the Luciano Pavarotti International Competition of Singing in Philadelphia. He was involved in various productions in France, including Eugene Onegin in the Opera of Lille, Didone by Francesco Cavalli in l’Opera Comique under the direction of Christophe Rousset, Pelléas and Mélisande in the Opera of Nantes, and L’appel de la mer, by Henri Rabaud, in the Opera of Nancy, under the direction of Mark Foster. He was also invited by the Opera of Prague for the role of Ping in Turandot, and played Figaro in The Barber of Seville at the Festival of Chiemgauer, in Germany.

Between 1998 and 2000, Alexiev toured in Germany, playing roles in Eugene Onegin and Don Giovanni, and portraying characters such as Marcello, Le Comte and Figaro in The Marriage of Figaro, and Peter in Hänsel and Gretel. During the Year of Verdi, he played roles such as Rigoletto, Iago, Don Carlo di Vargas, Ford, Amonasro, and Rodrigue in a series of concerts in Munich and Berlin. He sang Papageno in a production of Claude Santelli in Paris, Don Giovanni at the Opera of Nice, Mercurio in the L'incoronazione di Poppea in New York, production of the Opera of Amsterdam with Pierre Audi, Shaunard in the Lausanne Opera and in Luxembourg, Escamillo at the Grand Stade of France and in the Opera of Toulon, and Ziliante in Roland by Jean-Baptiste Lully, under direction by Christophe Rousset.

== Recordings ==
- La Vedova Scaltra, CD, Ermanno Wolf-Ferrari, Orchestre National de Montpellier. Orchestra chief: Enrique Mazzola.
- Roland, CD, Jean-Baptiste Lully, Christophe Rousset, played by Talents Lyriques, edited by Ambroisie.
- Zoroastre, DVD, Pierre Audi, Opus Arte.
- Le Jongleur de Notre Dame, CD, composed by Jules Massenet, Roberto Alagna, Evgueniy Alexiev
- Les Grandes Eaux Musicales De Versailles, CD, Jean-Baptiste Lully, Gluck, Rameau, Desmarest, Talents Lyriques, Christophe Rousset.

== Sources ==
- Alexiev's Official Web Site
- Evgueniy Alexiev's biography on concerts.com (in French)
- Platée, Opéra du Rhin
- Carmen au Stade de France
- Carmen, l'amour à mort
- Dans la loge d’Evgueniy Alexiev, artiste lyrique international
- 579 Don Carlo de Giuseppe Verdi, Minimalisme et Grand Opéra au Théâtre de Tours, par Caroline Alexander
