= Khristo Poshtakov =

Bulgarian author (born 1944)

- Born: September 22, 1944; Pavlikeni, Bulgaria
- Died: March 28, 2020; Madrid, Spain
- Occupations: short story author, novelist

Khristo Poshtakov (Bulgarian: Христо Пощаков; born September 22, 1944) is a Bulgarian short story author and novelist.

== Biography ==
Khristo Poshtakov was born in Pavlikeni, a town in the northern central part of Bulgaria.

In 1974, he graduated from the Technical University of Sofia as a mechanical engineer. His later work occupations include acting as a technical advisor at the Ministry of Food Industry in Havana, Cuba, from 1979 till 1984; director of a holding company and later a bus company in Bulgaria; deputy-chairman of the Board of Directors of Balkan Pres AD Ltd. in Sofia.

Up to 1998, Poshtakov worked as a translator for the Sara Translation House in Sofia. He retired officially in 2008, but has kept producing translations and writing his own works.

He was the first chairman of the Bulgarian Fantastika Foundation, representing Bulgarian science fiction fandom worldwide.

== Bibliography ==
Khristo Poshtakov's literary endeavours revolve mostly around hard science fiction. So far, he has had four novels and over 130 short stories published in various Bulgarian magazines, newspapers and anthologies. Some of his fiction and essays have been translated into English, Spanish, Russian, French, Dutch, Romanian, Greek, Italian, Hungarian and Portuguese and published in more than ten countries around the globe.

=== Notable publications in Bulgaria ===
- 1993, „Дежурство на Титан“ (A Duty on Titan), a collection of short stories and novelettes
- 1996, „Приключения в Дарвил“ (Adventures in Darville), a novel and short stories
- 1997, „Нашествието на грухилите“ (The Gruchils' Invasion), a novel
- 2003, „Меч, мощ и магия“ (Sword, Might and Magic), under the alias of Christopher Postman, a novel
- 2004, „Генератор на реалности“ (Generator of Realities), a collection of short stories and novelettes
- 2008, „Завладяването на Америка“ (The Conquest of America), a novel
- 2011, „Инвазия“ (Invasion), a collection of short stories and novelettes

=== Notable translations ===
- 2004, "Ce n'est que justice, Botkine!" (French translation of „Така е справедливо, Боткин!“, a short story), Utopiae 2004, France
- 2005, „Меч, магия и челюсти“ (Russian translation of „Меч, мощ и магия“), Russia
- 2006, Industria, luz y magia (Spanish translation of „Меч, мощ и магия“), Spain
- 2006, La transformación (collection of short stories translated into Spanish), Spain
- 2006, "Ten Thousand Dollars More" (English translation of „Още десет хиляди долара“, a novelette), Oceans of the Mind, USA
- 2006, "Development of science fiction and fantasy in Bulgaria" (English translation of „Развитие на българската фантастика“, an overview), Phantazm (A Dutch e-zine), Denmark
- 2009, „Гаси Америку“ (Russian translation of „Завладяването на Америка“), Russia

== Honors ==
In 1994, Poshtakov received the Eurocon award for his collection „Дежурство на Титан“ (A Duty on Titan) in Timișoara, Romania.
