= Chavdar Mutafov =

Bulgarian architect and writer (1899–1954)

Čavdar Mutafov
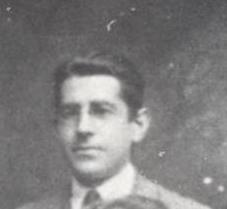
- Born: September 19, 1899; Sevlievo, Bulgaria
- Died: March 10, 1954 (aged 54); Sofia, Bulgaria
- Writing career
- Genres: essay, short story

Chavdar Mutafov (Bulgarian: Чавдар Мутафов; September 19, 1899 – March 10, 1954) was a Bulgarian architect and writer, considered to be one of the leading expressionist writers in his country during the period between the two world wars.

Mutafov was born in Sevlievo. He studied engineering in Munich from 1908 to 1914. He married Fani Popova and the couple continued their education in Munich during the 1920s, Mutafov studying architecture, before returning to Bulgaria.

Mutafov worked as an architect. He published essays in the monthly journal Zlatorog and also gave talks on modern art, music, film and industrial design. Besides his essays and novel, Mutafov also wrote short stories and grotesques.

His writing was subject to censorship under the communist regime in Bulgaria.

He died in Sofia in 1954.

A selection of his essays was published in 1993.

== Selected works ==
- Zelenijat kon (The green horse), essay (1920)
- ”Diletant (Dilettante), novel (1926)
