= Boris Aprilov =

Bulgarian writer and playwright (born 1921)

- Борис Априлов
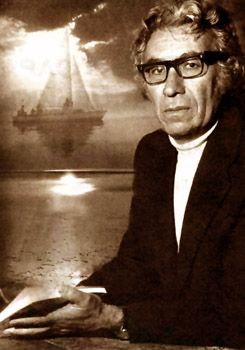
- Collage of Boris Aprilov in Sofia, 1975, his yacht 'Ahasfer' in the Black Sea, 1986, and the Dead Sea, Israel, 1992.
- Born: Atanas Vassilev Djavkov; 21 March 1921; Malko Tarnovo, Bulgaria, Europe
- Died: 10 April 1995 (aged 74); Tel Aviv, Israel
- Resting place: Carmel Hayfa, Israel
- Occupations: Novelist, short story writer, dramaturge

Atanas Vassilev Djavkov, better known by his pseudonym Boris Aprilov (Bulgarian: Борис Априлов, Hebrew: בוריס אפרילוב; 21 March 1921 – 10 April 1995), was a Bulgarian writer, playwright, dramaturge, satirist, and humorist, best known for his novels, plays, screenplays, and children's literature. He published works under the names Ahasver, Aho, and Ahoto, along with other aliases in the humorist journal Starshel.

== Biography ==
Atanas Vassilev Djavkov, known as Boris Aprilov, was born on 21 March 1921, in the small Bulgarian town of Malko Tarnovo. His father Vassil's family lived on welfare in Lozengrad until the liberation of Bulgaria from the Turkish occupation. His mother, Nanka, was an illiterate orphan from a peasant family, given at a very young age to a much older disabled veteran in an arranged marriage.

Aprilov's family moved to Burgas, where he completed his education. From his early school years, he published short stories, satiric essays, poetry, and prose in local newspapers.

In 1945, Boris Aprilov married Shela (Rachel) Abraham Cohen, born in Burgas (12 June 1918 – 2 September 1996, Tel Aviv). They met in the Burgas town library. They lived together and had two daughters: Djina Vassileva, born in Burgas on 15 November 1945, and Laura Vassileva, a writer born in Sofia (30 May 1950 – 2 September 1991, Hayfa, Israel).

In 1947, Aprilov was invited by the poet Radoy Ralin to work as a columnist for the satiric journal Sturshel, and the family moved to Sofia.

In 1956, Aprilov traveled to London and Western Europe with his wife during the Cold War.

An anonymous letter identified Aprilov as a spy. It was said that "Nasko" had been working as a British spy from a young age, that he sang aloud famous hits from English and American movies, and that he chose to travel to London instead of Moscow. Aprilov was warned by the leading editor of the journal, and he decided to resign before he was fired. As a result, he was blacklisted by the authorities, and as he was unable to find any employment as a journalist or editor, he lived exclusively off of his literary work.

From 1959 to 1963, Aprilov served as a lead dramaturge and screenplay editor in the Bulgarian State circuses.

Aprilov won many awards for his writing, including the Literary Prize of the Ministry of National Economy and the Golden Dolphin's Greatest Award.

Aprilov left Bulgaria and spent the last three years of his life in Tel Aviv, Israel, with his family. In 1991, his younger daughter died of lung disease. Shortly afterwards, Aprilov became sick himself; he died on 4 October 1995, in a Tel Aviv hospital. His wife also died a few months later in Tel Aviv.

== Works ==
=== Lisko series ===
Aprilov's wrote a series of books for children and adults about an adventurous fox named Lisko. Lisko travels from place to place, meeting characters from folklore and strange new creatures, and helping people along the way.

In 2019, 2020, and 2021, some of the Lisko books were reissued with new art by Mira Miroslavova and Petya Dimitrova-Leupep.

- The Adventures of Lisko in the Forest ("Приключенията на Лиско в гората", 1957);
- The Adventures of Lisko at Sea ("Приключенията на Лиско по море", 1968)
- The New Adventures of Lisko ("Новите приключения на Лиско", 1971) contains the novels:
  - Do not Touch the Suitcase („Не пипай куфара“)
  - Chimmy („Чими“)
  - The Watch („Часовникът“)
  - The Little Red Riding Hood („Червената шапчица“)
  - The Pit („Дупката“)
  - The Python („Питонът“)
- The Adventures of Lisko in the Land of the Square Beings („Приключенията на Лиско в страната на квадратните същества“, 1975)
- The Newest Adventures of Lisko („Най-новите приключения на Лиско“, 1975) contains the novels:
  - The Ghost („Привидението“);
  - The GrandPrise" („Голямата награда“);
- Ten Adventures of Lisko („Десет приключения на Лиско“, 1987) contains the previous eight novels, and:
  - The Wall („Стената“)
  - The Blue Flamingo („Синьото фламинго“)

=== Other children's books ===
- A Ball in the Sea („Топка в морето“) Fairy tale. 1965
- Poncho the Foal („Кончето Пончо“) Fairy tale. 1967
- The Parrot and The Butterfly („Папагалчето и пеперудката“) Fairy tale. 1968
- One Small White Cloud („Едно малко бяло облаче“) Fairy tale. 1970
- The Six Little Penguins („Шестте пингвинчета“. Повест за деца). 1978

=== Stageplays ===
Aprilov wrote many dramas and puppet plays for both children and adults.

The Egg

A children's puppet play about an egg that does not want to hatch "due to its unusual nature", but is convinced to hatch by its mother's love. It was performed in the State Puppet Theatre in Plovdiv, Bulgaria, where it received a gold medal from the Golden Dolphin awards.

The Six Little Penguins

A children's puppet play that was performed in the Czwerc Puppet Theatre in Białystok, Poland, where it received the Golden Dolphin's greatest award.

Chimi

The play has been performed in a number of countries, including the UK.
