= Nikolai Hristozov =

Bulgarian author

Nikolay Dimitrov Hristozov (6 January 1931 – 15 May 2015) was a Bulgarian writer and poet, with some 19 published books to his credit.

Hristozov's most well-known work was the novel Po diryata na bezsledno izcheznalite (On the Tracks of the Missing), which has been adapted into a miniseries of the same name.
