= Hristo Karastoyanov =

Bulgarian writer

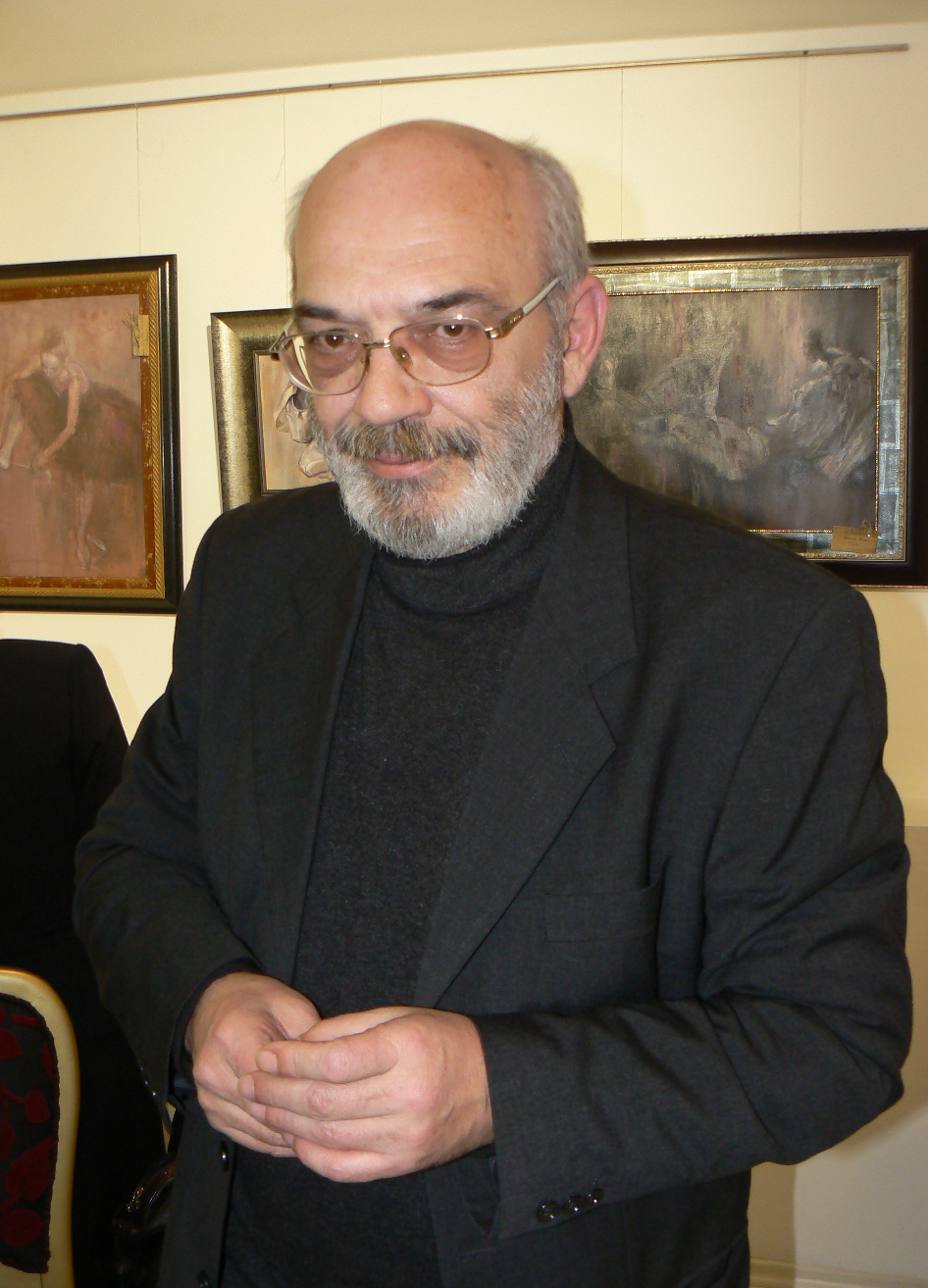

Hristo Karastoyanov (22 February 1950 – 23 January 2024) was a contemporary Bulgarian novelist.

Born in Topolovgrad, he studied Bulgarian Philology at Plovdiv University and made his debut in 1981 with the "Cracked Asphalt" stories.

He is the author of 26 books – fiction, political journalism, and poetry. His novel, Autopia: The Other Road to Hell, (2003), is in the list of the first five books nominated for the Vick Foundation award. Other books of his (Nefertiti in a Dark Night, 2001, Death Is of Preference, 2003, Consequences, 2005, Resistance.net, 2008, and The Spider, 2008) have been nominated for the award of Helikon Bookstores. These include his latest novel The Name, 2012.

He has been awarded a number of literary prizes, among which was the first prize in the unpublished novel contest of Razvitie Corporation (for his novel Death is of Preference, 2003), the award of the Bulgarian Writers’ Union for Notes on Historical Naiveté, 1999, the “Golden Chainlet” short-story award of Trud Daily, and the national “Chudomir” award for humorous story.

His book, Kocama Karı Arıyorum (in Turkish Wanted: A Wife for My Husband), “Janet 45” Publishing house, 2006, was presented at the 25th Istanbul Book Fair (2006).

He was a member of the professional Bulgarian Writers’ Union. He worked and lived in Yambol. Hristo Karastoyanov is survived by his wife, Sofia and son, Todor.

== Books ==
- T for Tashkent, novel, 2021
- Dodder, novel, 2020
- Life has no second half, novel, 2018
- The Same Night Awaits Us All: Diary of a Novel, novel, (in English in the US), 2018
- Postscript, novel, 2016
- The Same Night Awaits Us All: Diary of a Novel, novel, 2014
- Teufelszwirn, Roman in drei Büchern. Aus dem Bulgarischen von Andreas Tretner. Dittrich Verlag GmbH, Berlin 2012
- The Name, novel, 2012
- The Spider, novel, 2009, reprint 2011
- Resistance.net, novel, 2008
- Parallel Paranoias, stories, (two volumes – ID: The Year of the Tiger and 2007: Extant Memories), 2008
- Atlantis: Acts, novel, (bilingual: Bulgarian and English), 2008
- Kocama Karı Arıyorum, stories, in Turkish (“Wanted: A Wife for My Husband”) 2006
- Consequences, stories, 2005
- La Vie En Rose and Others of That Type, stories, 2004
- Death Is of Preference, novel, 2003
- Autopia: The Other Road to Hell, novel, 2003
- Nefertiti in a Winter Night, stories, 2001
- ID: The Year of the Tiger, stories, (co-writer: Lyubomir Kotev), 2000
- Notes on Historical Naiveté, political journalism, 1999
- The Death of Sancho Panzo, poetry, 1997
- Life: The Third Lie, stories, 1996
- Dusty Summer, novel, 1995
- Notes from the Times When the Future Was Bright, stories, 1993
- Dodder (trilogy: Perpetuum Mobile, Dodder and Mixed Up Chronicle), 1990 and 2001
- Ripe Taste, stories, 1989
- Mixed Up Chronicle, novel, 1987
- This Eternal Land, political journalism, 1985
- Perpetuum Mobile, novel, 1984
- Matvei Valev, literary critical essay, 1982
- Cracked Asphalt, stories, 1981
