= Georgi Gospodinov =

Bulgarian writer (born 1968)

- Георги Господинов
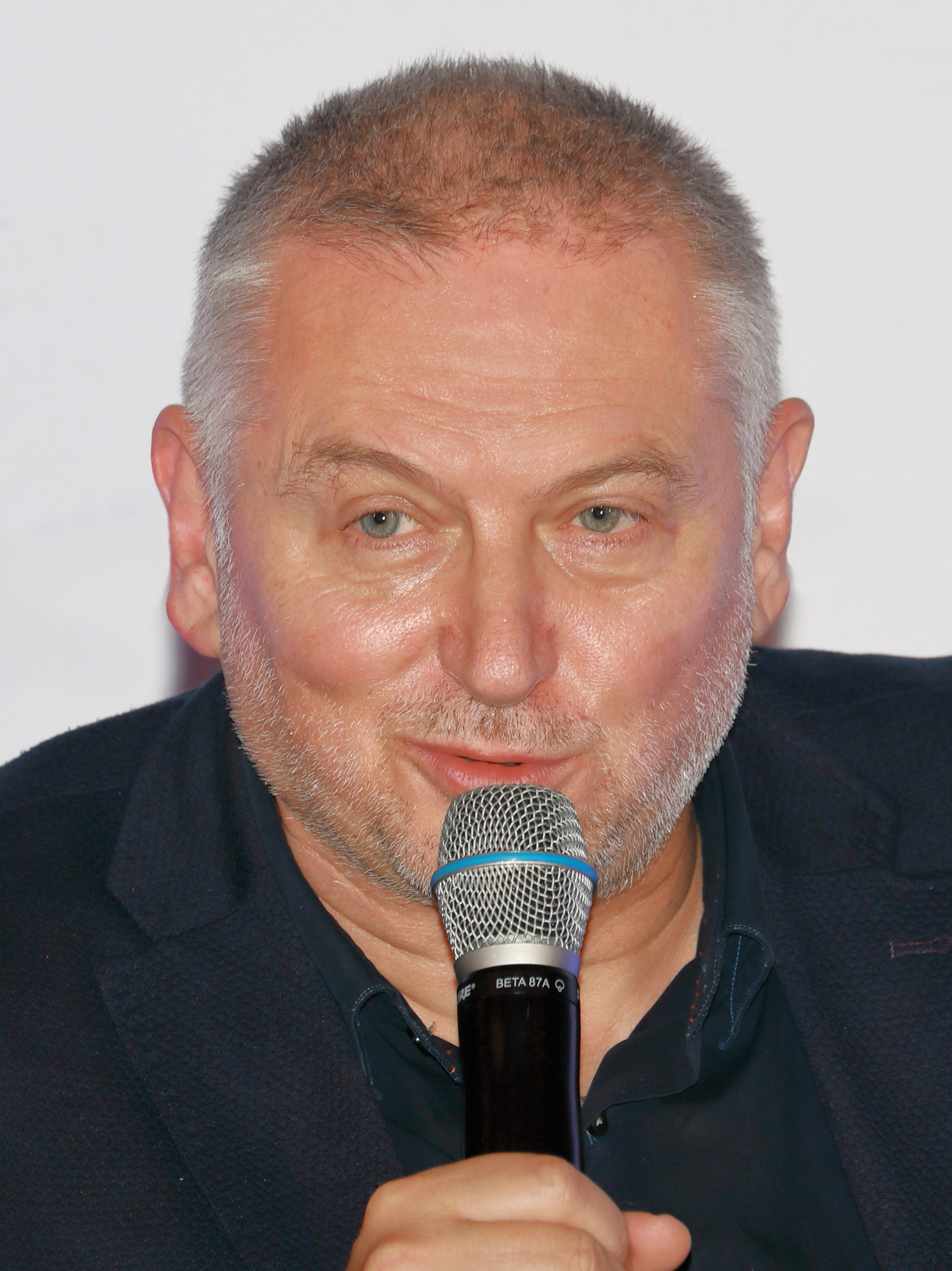
- Gospodinov 2025
- Born: January 7, 1968 (age 58); Yambol, Bulgaria
- Writing career
- Notable works: The Physics of Sorrow (2012); Time Shelter (2020); Death and the Gardener (2024)
- Notable awards: Jan Michalski Prize for Literature (2016); Angelus Award (2019); Strega European Prize (2021); Usedom Prize for European Literature (2021); Zinklar Prize for Best Short Fiction (2021); International Booker Prize (2023)
- Website: georgigospodinov.com

Georgi Gospodinov Georgiev (Bulgarian: Георги Господинов Георгиев; born 7 January 1968) is a Bulgarian writer, poet and playwright. His novel Time Shelter received the 2023 International Booker Prize, shared with translator Angela Rodel, as well as the Strega European Prize. His novel The Physics of Sorrow received the Jan Michalski Prize and the Angelus Award. His works have been translated into 25 languages.

Gospodinov writes complex narratives, based on the recent past of Eastern Europe and present anxieties across Europe and worldwide. His works often blend poetry into fiction and irony. According to The New Yorker, "Georgi's real quest in The Physics of Sorrow is to find a way to live with sadness, to allow it to be a source of empathy and salutary hesitation…"

== Personal life and education ==
Gospodinov was born 7 January 1968 in Yambol, Bulgaria. He majored in Bulgarian studies at Sofia University. He received his PhD in New Bulgarian Literature from the Bulgarian Academy of Sciences. His father died of cancer on 20 December 2023; Gospodinov's 2024 book, Death and the Gardener, is based on this experience.

== Career ==
=== Literary works ===
Gospodinov began writing poetry in the early 1990s, publishing two books Lapidarium (Лапидариум, 1992) and The cherry of a people (Черешата на един народ, 1996) which received national literary prizes in his native Bulgaria. He became internationally known by his Natural Novel, which was published in 21 languages. Described by The New Yorker as an "anarchic, experimental debut", and by The Guardian as "both earthy and intellectual", the novel explores the life of a young writer in post-communism Bulgaria.

Gospodinov's 2001 collection of short stories And Other Stories was longlisted for Frank O'Connor Award and translated into multiple languages. It contains the story "Blind Vaysha", which was turned into a short animation film of the same name.

He co-authored the graphic novel The Eternal Fly, published in 2010, with the artist Nikola Toromanov.

His second novel, The Physics of Sorrow (2012), won the Bulgarian National Award for Best Novel of the Year 2013 and was translated into multiple languages. Frankfurter Allgemeine Zeitung praised the novel as "a gorgeous work that should definitely be read". According to Neue Zurcher Zeitung "with Physics of Sorrow Gospodinov launches not only the Bulgarian literature but also himself in the European writers' first league." In 2014, the Italian edition of the novel was shortlisted for the Strega European Prize; the German edition was a finalist for Internationaler Literaturpreis – Haus der Kulturen der Welt and Brücke Berlin Literatur- und Übersetzerpreis. From January to June 2019, Gospodinov was writer-in-residence of the Literaturhaus Zurich and the PWG Foundation in Zurich.

His novel Time Shelter, first published in 2020, has also been translated into multiple languages. It was described by author Olga Tokarczuk as "the most exquisite kind of literature, on our perception of time and its passing, written in a masterful and totally unpredictable style." Newspaper La Repubblica described Gospodinov as "a Proust coming from the East", while author Sandro Veronesi described Time Shelter as "a powerful and brilliant novel: clear-sighted, foreboding, enigmatic. A novel in which the future gives way like a rotten beam and the past rushes in like a flood." For Time Shelter, Gospodinov was awarded the Strega European Prize in 2021 and the English translation by Angela Rodel received the International Booker Prize in 2023.

Death and the Gardener (2024) is the new book of Gospodinov.

In 2026, W&N published The Man With Many Names, an English-language collection of 40 short stories drawn from two earlier Bulgarian collections and translated by Angela Rodel.

=== Films ===
Gospodinov wrote two screenplays for two short feature films. His screenplay for Omelette received an Honorable Mention at the 2009 Sundance Film Festival.

The 2016 animated short Blind Vaysha by Bulgarian-Canadian filmmaker Theodore Ushev is based on a Gospodinov short story. It was nominated for the Best Animated Short at the 89th Academy Awards. In 2019, Ushev released another animated short film adaptation of Gospodinov's work, The Physics of Sorrow.

== Recognitions ==
=== Awards and nominations ===
- Ordre des Arts et des Lettres, 2024, Chevalier
- International Booker Prize, 2023, winner;
- Premio Gregor von Rezzori, 2022, finalist;
- Strega European Prize, Rome, 2021, winner;
- Usedom Prize for European Literature, 2021, winner;
- Zinklar Prize for Best Short Fiction, Denmark, 2021, winner;
- Angelus Award, Poland, 2019, winner;
- Jan Michalski Prize for Literature, Switzerland, 2016, winner;
- Prozart Award, Skopje, for contribution to the development of literature in the Balkans, 2016, winner;
- The American PEN Translation Prize, 2016, finalist;
- The Best Translated Book Award (BTBA), 2016, finalist;
- Strega European Prize, Rome, 2014, finalist;
- Premio Gregor von Rezzori, Florence, 2014, finalist;
- Bruecke Berlin Preis, 2014, finalist;
- Haus der Kulturen der Welt Literaturpreis, Berlin, 2014, finalist;
- National Literary Award Bulgarian Novel of the Year, 2013, winner;
- National Award Hristo G. Danov for Best Fiction, 2012, winner;
- The City of Sofia Award for Literature, 2012, winner;
- The Flower of Helicon Readers' Prize for Bestselling Book, 2012, winner.

=== Honors ===
- Royal Society of Literature International Writer, 2024.

== Bibliography ==
- Natural Novel. Translated by Hristova, Zornitsa. London: Dalkey Archive Press. 2005. ISBN 978-1-56478-376-9 – via Internet Archive. (Bulgarian: Естествен роман, English translation by Zornitza Hristova, 2005)
- And Other Stories, 2001 (Bulgarian: И други истории, English translation by Alexis Levitin, 2007)
- The Story Smuggler. Translated by Kovacheva, Kristina; Gunn, Dan. Paris and London: Center for Writers and Translators at the American University of Paris and Sylph Editions. 2016. ISBN 978-1-909631-20-5 – via Internet Archive.
- The Physics of Sorrow. Translated by Rodel, Angela. Rochester, NY: Open Letter. 2015. ISBN 978-1-940953-09-0 – via Internet Archive. (Bulgarian: Физика на тъгата, English translation by Angela Rodel, 2015)
- Time Shelter. 2020. (Bulgarian: Времеубежище; English translation by Angela Rodel; French translation by Marie Vrinat-Nikolov)
- Death and the Gardener. Translated by Rodel, Angela. Penguin Random House. 2024. (Bulgarian: Градинарят и смъртта, romanized: Gradinaryat i smărtta)
