= Milen Ruskov =

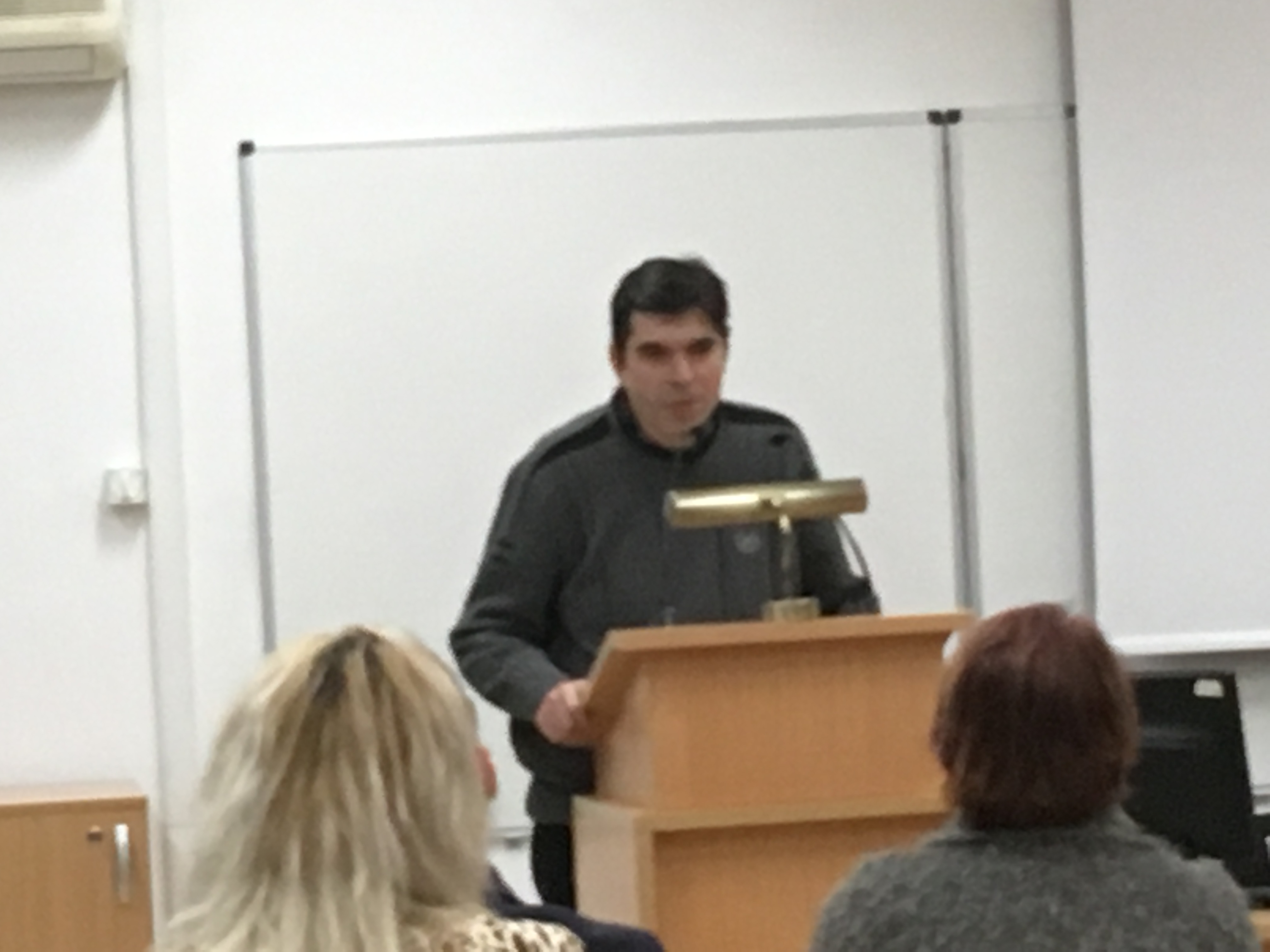
Milen Ruskov at New Bulgarian University in January 2018

Milen Ruskov (Bulgarian: Милен Русков; born 1966) is a Bulgarian writer and translator. He graduated from Sofia University in 1995.

== Awards and honours ==
- 2014 European Union Prize for Literature, Bulgaria, Vazvishenie (Summit)

== Works ==
Novels

- Pocket Encyclopaedia of Mysteries (2004)
- Thrown into Nature (2008, BG; 2011, U.S.)
- Vazvishenie (Summit) (2011)
- Chamkoria (2017)
