= Emil Andreev =

Bulgarian writer

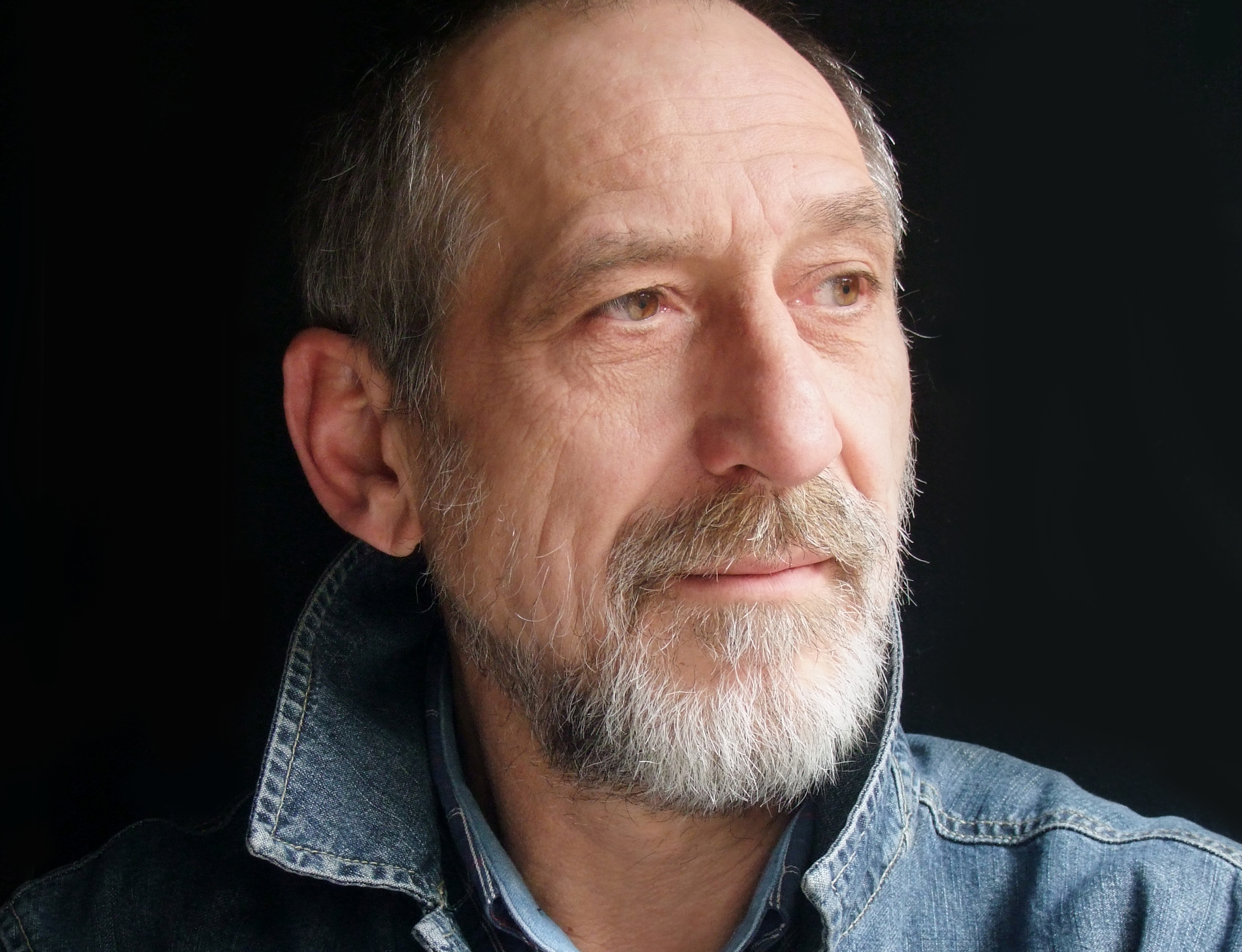
- Born: 1 September 1956; Lom, Bulgaria
- Occupations: Novelist, writer, playwright
- Writing career
- Language: Bulgarian

Emil Andreev (Bulgarian: Емил Андреев) (born 1 September 1956, Lom, Bulgaria) is a Bulgarian author, playwright, and novelist.

== Biography ==
Emil Andreev graduated from English Language Studies from the Veliko Tarnovo University. He has worked as a teacher, newspaper editor and lecturer in English at Sofia University "St. Kliment Ohridski".

Emil Andreev has won several awards for his writing, including the Vick prize for Best Bulgarian Novel, and Helikon prizes for fiction.

Emil Andreev is the author of "Treasure-hunters", "The Baby", and the comedy "To Kill a Prime Minister", which were performed on the stage of the Theatre of Satire in Sofia.

Emil Andreev works have been translated into several languages, including English, German, Polish, Romanian, Slovak, and Serbian.

His novel "The Glass River", has been filmed with an international cast and has been featured on screen in Bulgaria.

== Awards and nominations ==
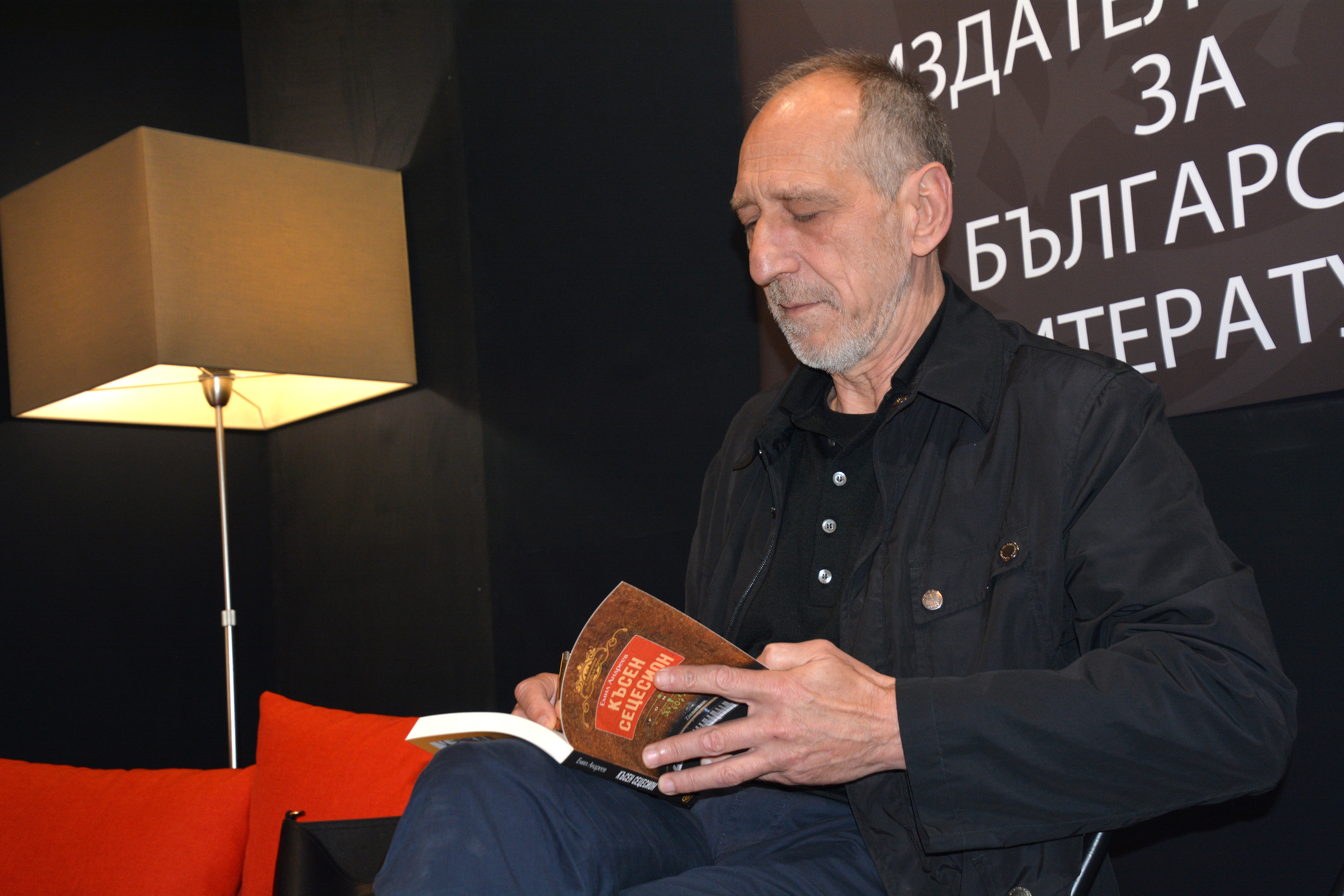

- 2007 – Nominated for Elias Canetti Award for The Curse of the Frog
- 2007 – Nominated for the Balkanika Award for The Glass River
- 2007 – Winner of the Helikon National Award for The Curse of The Frog
- 2006 – Nomination for the Best East European Novel for The Glass River
- 2005 – Winner of the VICK Award “Novel of the Year” for The Glass River
- 2005 – Winner of the Readers’ Award for The Glass River

== Books ==
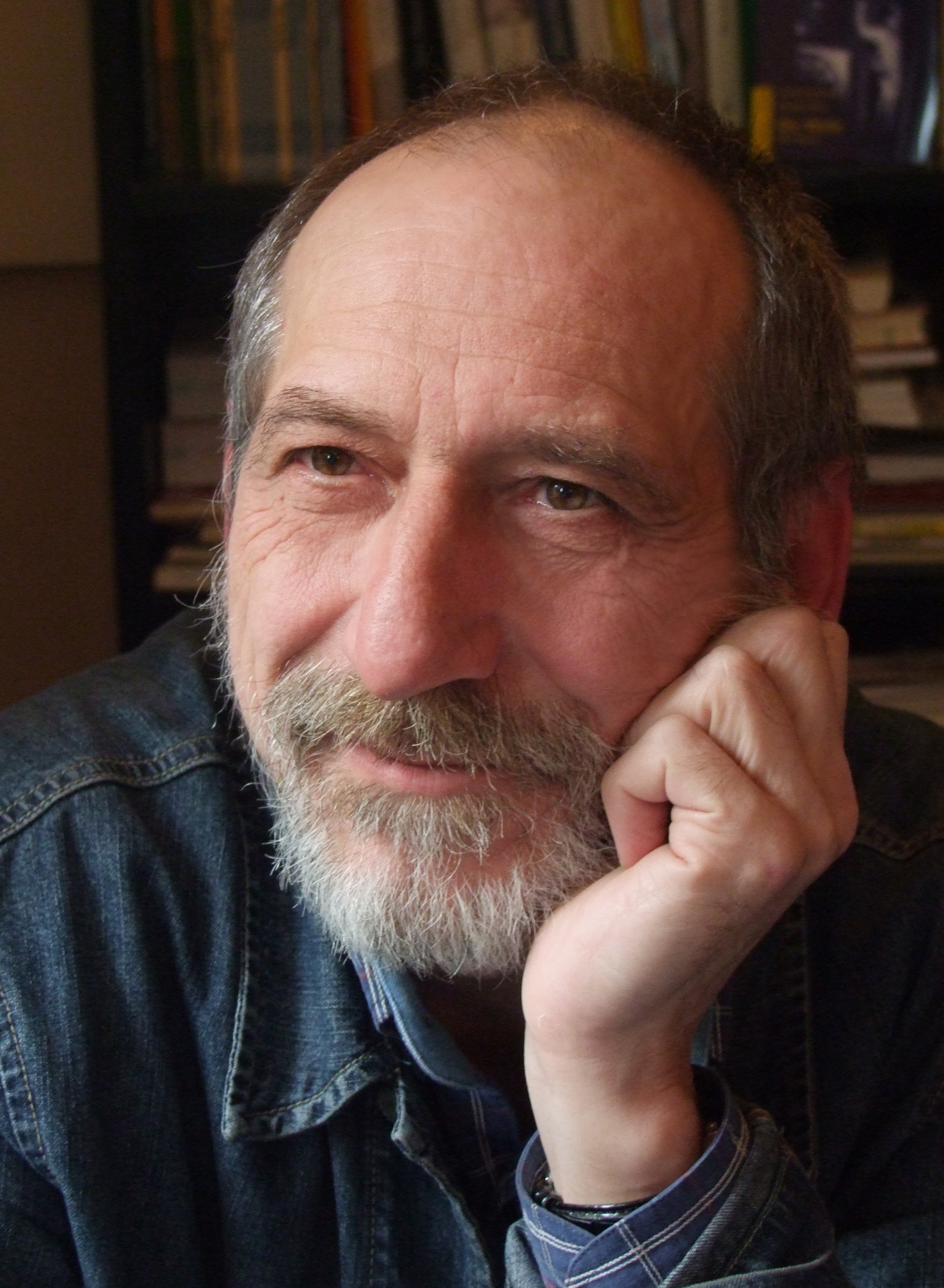

Short Stories:

- Lom Stories (1996)
- Late Art Nouveau (1998)
- The Drunkard’s Island (1999)

Plays

- To Kill a Prime Minister (2002)
- The Treasure Hunters (2003)
- J's Magical Boat (2005)

Novels

- The Glass River (2004)
- The Curse of the Frog (2006)
- Crazy Luka (2010)
