= Alek Popov =

Bulgarian writer (1966–2024)

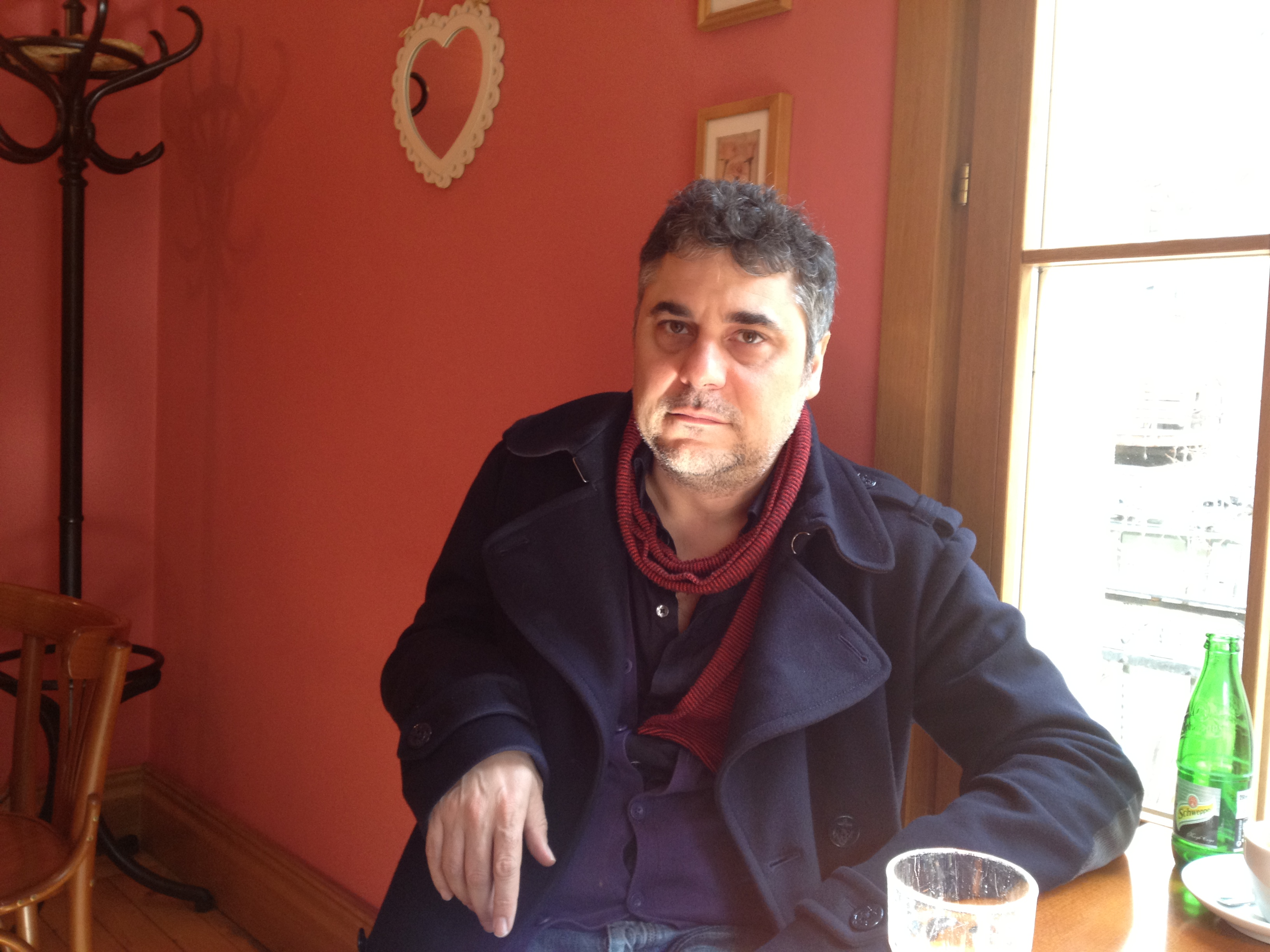

Alek Vasilev Popov (Bulgarian: Алек Василев Попов; 16 January 1966 – 22 March 2024) was a Bulgarian novelist, short story writer, essayist and scriptwriter, author of the novel Mission London.

== Biography ==
Alek Popov was born in Sofia on 16 January 1966. He studied in the elite classical gymnasium in Sofia and later received an M.A. in Bulgarian philology from the University of Sofia. He was an author of two novels. His first novel, Mission London, was translated to 12 languages and later the film based on the book was a great success and had a box office record high in Bulgaria, outperforming Avatar. His short stories have been translated into 11 languages, including English, German, and French. The English translation of Popov's "Mission London" was published by Istros Books, London in 2014.

Popov died on 22 March 2024, at the age of 58.

== Bibliography ==
- 2001 – Mission London – "Мисия Лондон“
- 2007 – The Black Box – "Черната кутия“
- 2013 – The Palaveevi Sisters: In the storm of History – "Сестри Палавееви в бурята на историята“
- 2014 – The Black Box: Dogs are Flying Low – "Черната кутия: ниско прелитащи кучета“
- 2017 – The Palaveevi Sisters: On the Road to the New World – "Сестри Палавееви. По пътя към новия свят“
- 2021 – Mission Turan – "Мисия Туран“
