= Mihalaki Georgiev =

Bulgarian writer, diplomat, and social figure (1854–1916)

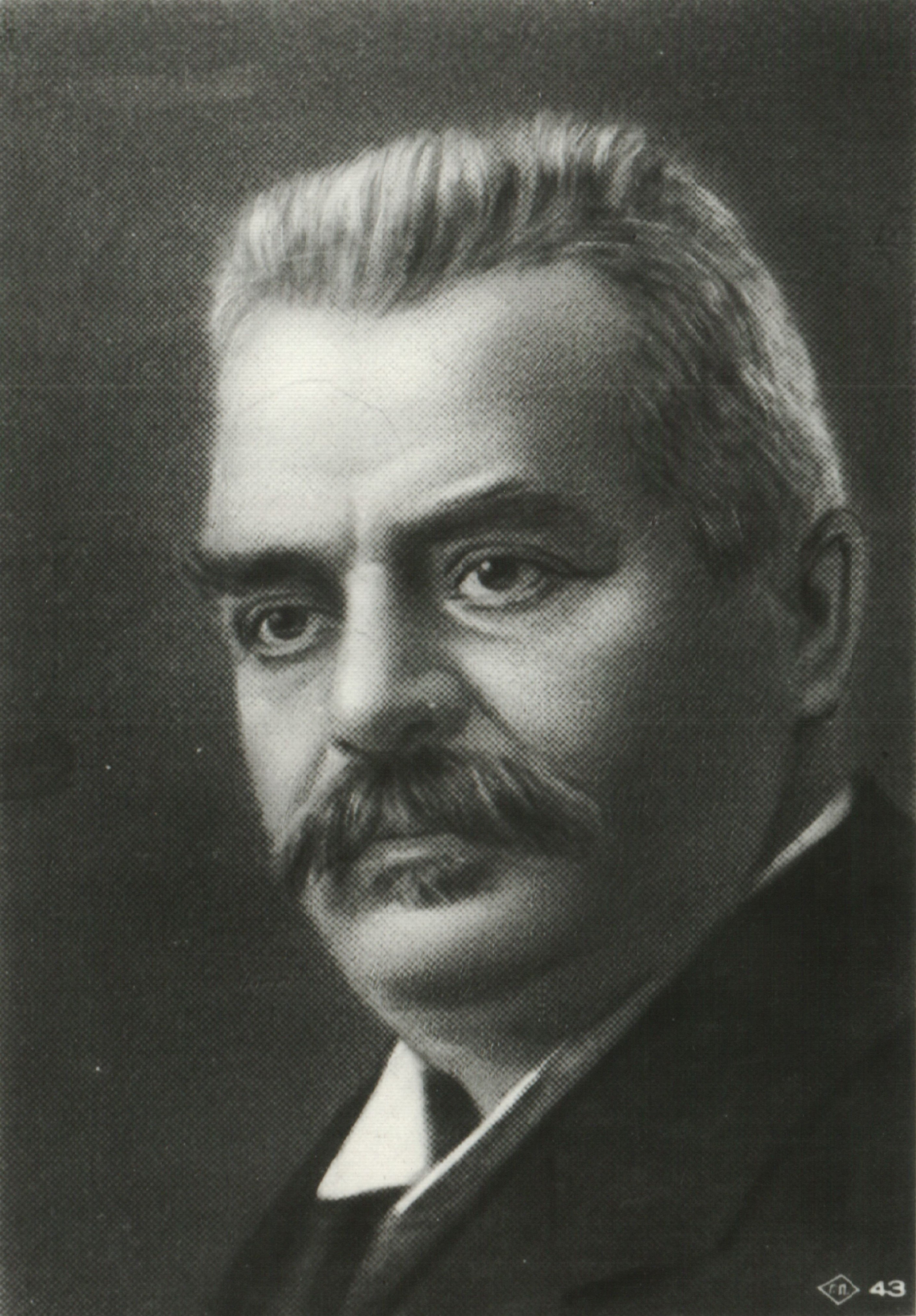
Photo of Mihalaki Georgiev by Grigor Paskov, unknown date

Mihalaki Georgiev (Bulgarian: Михалаки Георгиев, August 11, 1854 – February 14, 1916) was a Bulgarian writer, diplomat, and social figure. He was born in Vidin and died in Sofia. He attended the Tabor Industrial-Agricultural School from 1872 to 1874, and in 1880 was one of the founding members of the Slavic Tribune. He served as ambassador in Belgrade and Vienna, beginning on 14 November 1896 and lasting until 1899. From 1906 to 1908 he served as the chief editors of the Balkan Tribune.

His writing was influenced by the Russian Narodnik movement.

== Works ==
- Така се лъже човек. Хумореска (1899)
- „Три срещи. Спомени от миналото (1899)
- „От късмета е всичко на този свят (1904)
- „Разкази и хуморески. т. I, т. II, with preface by Ivan Vazov (1919, 1921)
