= Elena Alexieva =

Bulgarian writer

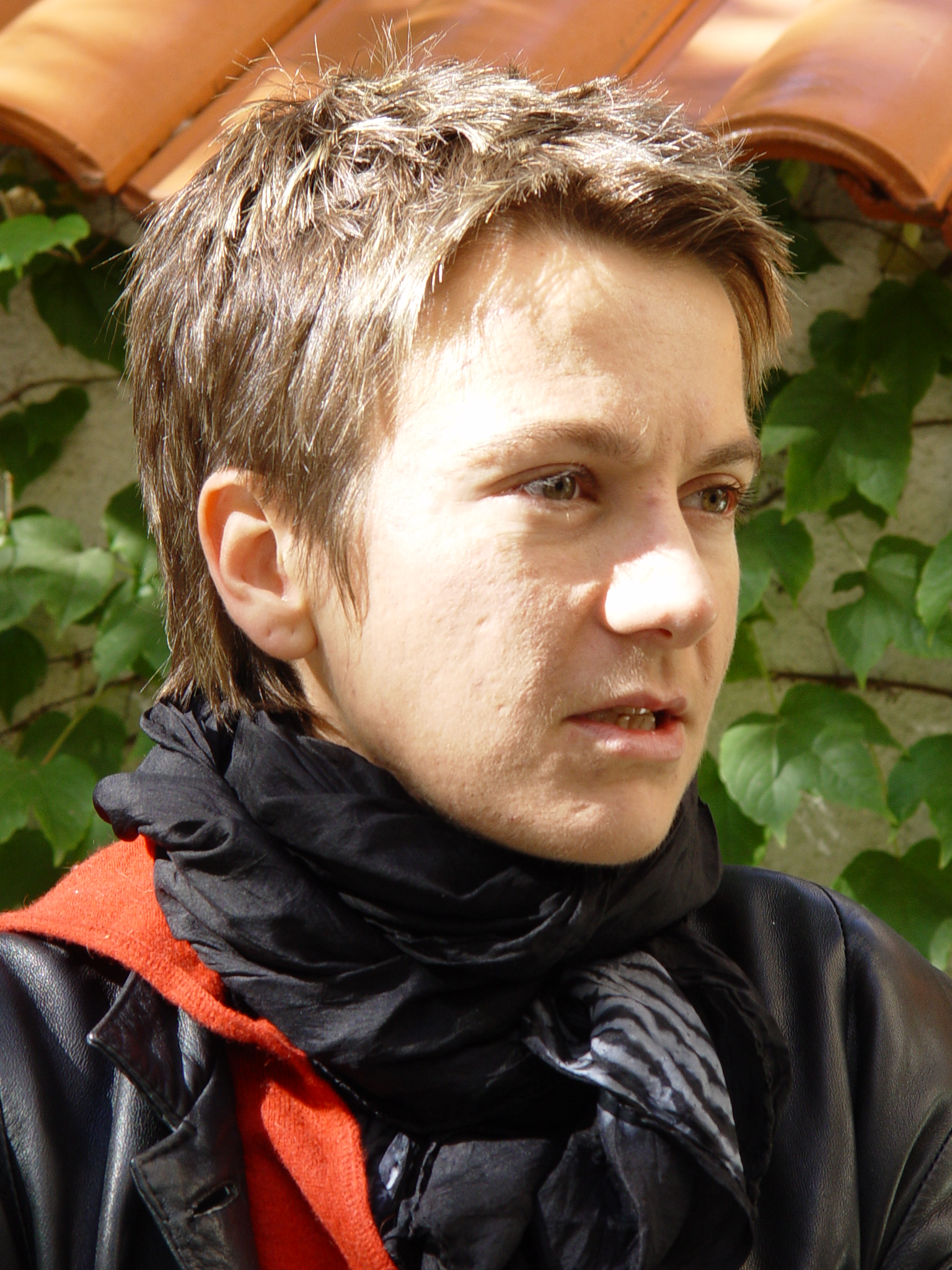
Elena Alexieva

Elena Alexieva (Bulgarian: Елена Алексиева born 12 April 1975) is a Bulgarian writer.

== Life ==
Alexieva at the First English Language School in Sofia. She majored in International Economic Relations at the University of National and World Economics in Sofia, and continued her studies in the Doctoral Program in Semiotics at New Bulgarian University, Sofia. She has taught translation from English into Bulgarian and from Bulgarian into English at New Bulgarian University since 2007.

In 2016, she appeared at the New Literature from Europe Festival..

== Books ==
Poetry

- Бримка на сърцето (Ladder on the Heart), 1994.
- Лице на ангел-екзекутор (Face of Killer Angel), 1996.

Novel

- Синята стълба (The Blue Stairway), 2000.
- Рицарят, дяволът, смъртта (Knight, Devil, and Death), 2007.
- Тя е тук (She Is Here), 2009.
- Нобелистът (Novel Prize), 2012.

Short stories,

- Читателска група 31 (Readers’ Group 31), 2005.
- Кой? (Who), 2006.
- Синдикатът на домашните любимци (Pets Syndicated), 2010.
