= List of Bulgarian women writers =

This is a list of women writers who were born in Bulgaria or whose writings are closely associated with that country.

== A ==
- Elena Alexieva (born 1975), poet, short story writer, novelist, translator

== B ==
- Elisaveta Bagriana (1893–1991), early poet, magazine editor, poems translated into English
- Miryana Ivanova Basheva (1947–2020), poet
- Iana Boukova (born 1968) Bulgarian poet, novelist, playwright and literary translator

== D ==
- Svetla Damyanovska, contemporary poet, novelist
- Alexenia Dimitrova (born 1960s), investigative journalist
- Blaga Dimitrova (1922–2003), poet, Vice-President of Bulgaria
- Kristin Dimitrova (born 1963), widely published poet, short story writer, editor, columnist, translator
- Theodora Dimova (born 1960), novelist, playwright
- Guerguina Dvoretzka (born 1954), poet, novelist, journalist
- Emiliya Dvoryanova (born 1958), novelist, musician

== E ==
- Zdravka Evtimova (born 1959), short story writer, novelist

== F ==
- Lyudmila Filipova (born 1977), best selling novelist, journalist

== G ==
- Dora Gabe (1886–1983), poet, magazine editor, columnist, travel writer, children's writer, translator

== I ==
- Mirela Ivanova (born 1962), acclaimed poet, essayist, critic, poems translated into English

== K ==
- Tsvetta Kaleynska (born 1988), author, marketing consultant and model
- Ekaterina Karabasheva (born 1989), poet, short story writer, works translated into English
- Anna Karima (1871–1949), translator, editor, journalist, women's rights activist
- Kapka Kassabova (born 1973), poet, essayist, writing in English
- Julia Kristeva (born 1941), philosopher, novelist, essayist, critic, feminist, living in France

== L ==
- Lora Lazar, pen-name of a Bulgarian crime writer
- Ruzha Lazarova (born 1968), novelist, short story writer, writing in Bulgarian and French

== M ==
- Aksinia Mihaylova (born 1963), widely translated poet, journal editor, translator, writing in Bulgarian and French
- Leda Mileva (1920–2013), prominent poet, children's writer
- Aleksandra Monedzhikova (1889–1959), geographer, author, travel writer

== N ==
- Milena Nikolova (born 1984), poet, prose writer

== O ==
- Nina Ognianova, investigative journalist since 2007, essayist

== P ==
- Milkana Palavurova (born 1974), yoga teacher, writings on yoga
- Maria Popova (born 1984), writes cultural articles on her blog BrainPickings.org, now lives in New York

== R ==
- Valentina Dimitrova Radinska (born 1951), poet, editor

== S ==
- Julia Spiridonova–Yulka (born 1972), short story writer, novelist, children's writer
- Albena Stambolova (born 1957), psychologist, columnist, novelist
- Tea Sugareva (born 1989), theatre director, poet

== V ==
- Svetla Vassileva (born 1964), non-fiction writer, columnist, blogger

== Y ==
- Yana Yazova, pen name of Lyuba Todorova Gancheva (1912–1974), poet, historical novelist
- Ekaterina Petrova Yosifova (1941–2022), journalist, essayist, poet

== See also ==
- List of women writers
- List of Bulgarian writers
