= Oleg Mandrykin =

Russian politician (born 1968)

- Олег Анатольевич Мандрыкин
- Born: Oleg Anatolyevich Mandrykin; 20 November 1968 (age 57); Tashkent, Uzbek SSR, Soviet Union
- Citizenship: Russia
- Education: Leningrad Shipbuilding Institute (Severodvinsk branch)
- Occupations: Businessman, environmental activist, politician
- Years active: 2009–2022
- Known for: Opposition to the Shiyes landfill, 2020 Arkhangelsk gubernatorial bid
- Movement: Stop Shiyes coalition, Clean North 29

Oleg Anatolyevich Mandrykin (Russian: Оле́г Анато́льевич Мандры́кин; born 20 November 1968) is an Arkhangelsk Oblast (Russia) opposition politician, environmental activist and real estate businessman from Severodvinsk. He was one of the leaders of the protests against the construction of a landfill near the Shies railway station and sought to run in the 2020 Arkhangelsk Oblast gubernatorial election, but was denied registration for the formal reasons often deemed as repression against independent candidates. In the 2021 Russian legislative election he ran in the Arkhangelsk constituency (No. 72) as the Yabloko candidate and, backed by environmental activists and Smart Voting, and finished second with 17.63% of the vote.

== Early life and career ==
Mandrykin was born on 20 November 1968 in Tashkent. He moved to Severodvinsk, then a closed city, at the age of 16 and trained as a welder. After the dissolution of the Soviet Union he went into real estate and became head of the Variant real estate agency in Severodvinsk.

== Environmental activism ==
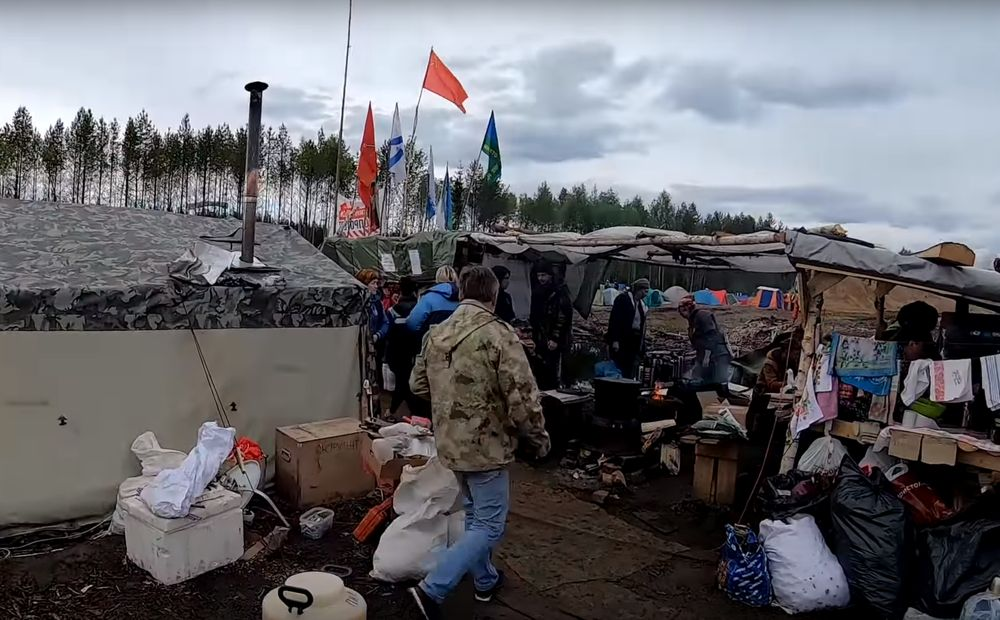
Protest camp at the Shies station

Mandrykin entered public life through a local protest against a planned landfill near summer-cottage settlements outside Severodvinsk. He became the head of the public movement Clean North 29 (Чистый Север 29) and joined the Stop Shies coalition, an alliance of environmental groups opposing a landfill for Moscow waste near the Shies railway station. On 4 June 2019 he was among nine activists detained after clashes with police at the Shies construction site.

The protests became one of the few successful anti-government protest movements in Russia: the landfill project was halted, and in April 2020 Governor Igor Orlov resigned under pressure from the protests.

In 2021 a court in Severodvinsk fined Mandrykin 10,000 rubles for not wearing a mask at a street meeting against the development of a city park.

== Political career ==
=== 2020 gubernatorial campaign ===
In February 2020 Mandrykin won an online "people's governor" vote organised by the Stop Shies coalition, after which the coalition backed him as its candidate. As a non-party candidate, he was nominated by the liberal party Yabloko. Under the municipal filter he needed the signatures of 189 municipal deputies in Arkhangelsk oblast, and he submitted 198. The regional election commission rejected 23 signatures from deputies who had already signed for another candidate and ruled that he had collected signatures in only 20 of the 21 required districts, and on 7 August 2020 refused to register him. The Arkhangelsk Regional Court and the Second Court of Appeal in Saint Petersburg upheld the decision.

The election monitoring group Golos described the case as one deserving attention and noted that candidates supported by the Shiyes movement were unable to register in both Arkhangelsk Oblast and the Komi Republic, a neighbor region. After he was barred, some activists called for a boycott of the election. The election was won by acting governor Alexander Tsybulsky, member of the United Russia party.

=== 2021 State Duma election ===
On 6 May 2021 Mandrykin was detained by police in Velsk while travelling to an online congress of the Stop Shiyes coalition dedicated to the upcoming State Duma election. He was released two hours later.

In the 2021 election he ran in the Arkhangelsk constituency (nu. 72) as the Yabloko candidate, with the support of local environmental groups, and said he faced constant hostility from the authorities. He finished second with 17.63 % of the vote, behind Alexander Spiridonov of United Russia (28.88%).

=== Later events ===
In February 2022 police searched four offices of Mandrykin's real estate agency as part of a tax evasion investigation. Mandrykin linked the searches to the upcoming municipal election in Severodvinsk.
