= Kotlas constituency =

Legislative constituency in Russia

Kotlas single-member constituency
- Constituency of the Russian State Duma

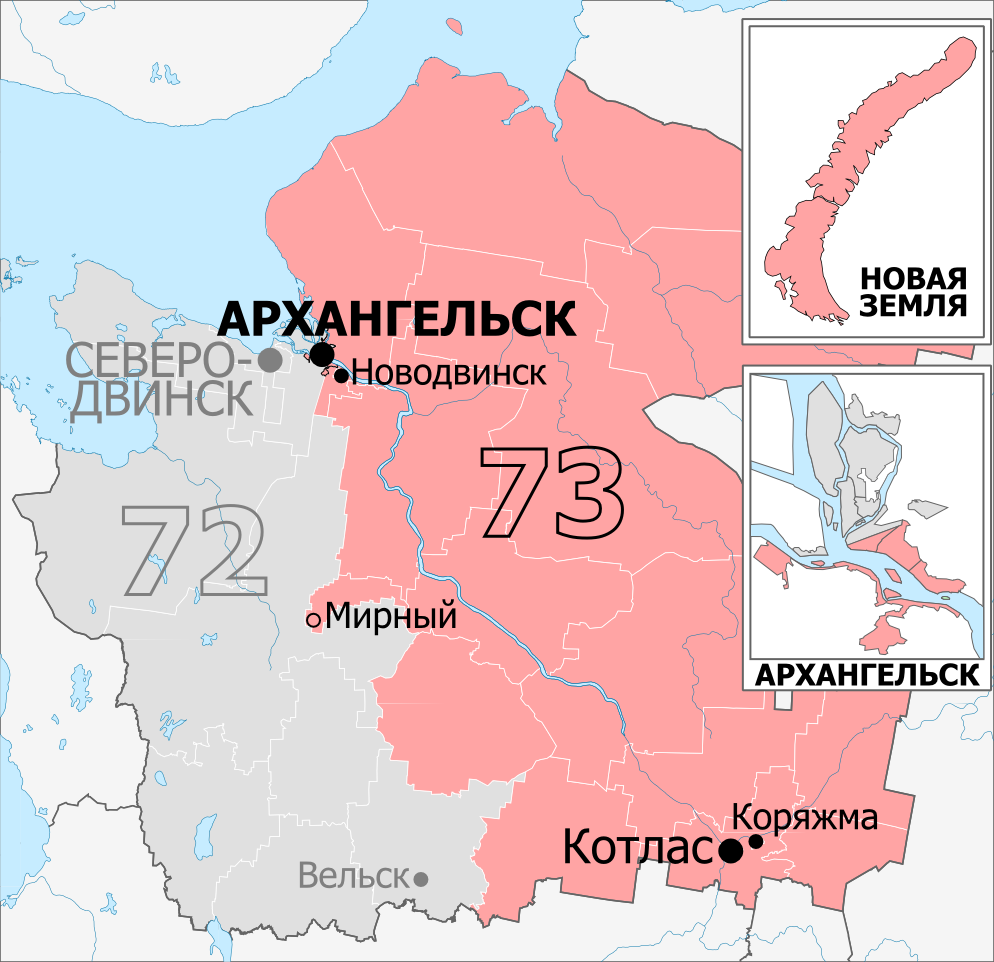
- Constituency boundaries since 2016
- Deputy: Maria Kharchenko; Liberal Democratic Party
- Federal subject: Arkhangelsk Oblast
- Districts: Arkhangelsk (Isakogorsky, Lomonosovsky, Mayskaya Gorka, Tsiglomensky, Varavino-Faktoriya), Kholmogorsky, Koryazhma, Kotlas, Kotlassky, Krasnoborsky, Lensky, Leshukonsky, Mezensky ZATO Mirny, Novaya Zemlya, Novodvinsk, Pinezhsky, Primorsky (Bobrovo-Lyavlenskoye, Katuninskoye, Lisestrovskoye, Talazhskoye, Uyemskoye), Shenkursky, Ustyansky, Verkhnetoyemsky, Vilegodsky, Vinogradovsky
- Voters: 427,552 (2026)

The Kotlas constituency (No.77 (Note: No.61 in 1993-1995, No.60 in 1995-2003, No.62 in 2003-2007, No.73 in 2016–2026)) is a Russian legislative constituency in Arkhangelsk Oblast. The constituency covers southern half of Arkhangelsk and eastern and northern Arkhangelsk Oblast.

The constituency has been represented since 2026 by Liberal Democratic deputy Maria Kharchenko, two-term State Duma member and party activist, who won the open seat, succeeding four-term United Russia incumbent Elena Vtorygina.

== Boundaries ==
1993–2003: Kargopolsky District, Kholmogorsky District, Konoshsky District, Koryazhma, Kotlas, Kotlassky District, Krasnoborsky District, Lensky District, Mirny, Novodvinsk, Nyandomsky District, Onega, Russia, Onezhsky District, Plesetsky District, Shenkursky District, Ustyansky District, Velsky District, Verkhnetoyemsky District, Vilegodsky District, Vinogradovsky
The constituency covered most of Arkhangelsk Oblast to the south of Arkhangelsk (roughly 2/3 of the region), including the cities of Koryazhma, Kotlas, Novodvinsk and Onega, Russia.

2003–2007: Kargopolsky District, Kholmogorsky District, Konoshsky District, Koryazhma, Kotlas, Kotlassky District, Krasnoborsky District, Lensky District, Mirny, Nyandomsky District, Onega, Russia, Onezhsky District, Plesetsky District, Shenkursky District, Ustyansky District, Velsky District, Verkhnetoyemsky District, Vilegodsky District, Vinogradovsky
After 2003 the constituency was slightly changes as it lost the industrial city of Novodvinsk to Arkhangelsk constituency.

2016–present: Arkhangelsk (Isakogorsky, Lomonosovsky, Mayskaya Gorka, Tsiglomensky, Varavino-Faktoriya), Kholmogorsky District, Koryazhma, Kotlas, Kotlassky District, Krasnoborsky District, Lensky District, Leshukonsky District, Mezensky District Mirny, Novaya Zemlya, Novodvinsk, Pinezhsky District, Primorsky District (Bobrovo-Lyavlenskoye, Katuninskoye, Lisestrovskoye, Talazhskoye, Uyemskoye), Shenkursky District, Ustyansky District, Verkhnetoyemsky District, Vilegodsky District, Vinogradovsky District
The constituency was re-created for the 2016 election and it retained central and eastern Arkhangelsk Oblast, losing its western portion to Arkhangelsk constituency. This seat gained southern Arkhangelsk and most of northern Arkhangelsk Oblast from the former Arkhangelsk constituency.

== Members elected ==
Election	Member	Party
1993	Aleksandr Piskunov	Independent
1995	Yury Guskov	Communist Party
1999	Vitaly Predybaylov	Independent
2003	Valery Malchikhin	United Russia
2007	Proportional representation - no election by constituency	
2011	Proportional representation - no election by constituency	
2016	Andrey Palkin	United Russia
2021	Elena Vtorygina	United Russia
2026	Maria Kharchenko	Liberal Democratic Party

== Election results ==
=== 1993 ===
Summary of the 12 December 1993 Russian legislative election in the Kotlas constituency
Candidate	Party	Votes	%
Aleksandr Piskunov	Independent	118,677	40.89%
Gennady Klepikovsky	Democratic Party	98,243	33.85%
against all		55,984	19.29%
Total		290,215	100%

=== 1995 ===
Summary of the 17 December 1995 Russian legislative election in the Kotlas constituency
Candidate	Party	Votes	%
Yury Guskov	Communist Party	65,028	19.36%
Vsevolod Bogdanov	Independent	46,168	13.74%
Vladimir Fedorov	Independent	36,171	10.77%
Yevgeny Ukhin	Liberal Democratic Party	33,073	9.85%
Sergey Gorshkov	Independent	22,999	6.85%
Sergey Kolotilov	Agrarian Party	22,624	6.74%
Vyacheslav Kalyamin	Political Movement of Transport Workers	20,285	6.04%
Vladimir Yenyagin	Independent	19,113	5.69%
Viktor Danichkin	Independent	15,060	4.48%
Valery Kabanov	Independent	9,150	2.72%
against all		40,604	12.09%
Total		335,908	100%

=== 1999 ===
Summary of the 19 December 1999 Russian legislative election in the Kotlas constituency
Candidate	Party	Votes	%
Vitaly Predybaylov	Independent	49,797	15.65%
Aleksandr Korygin	Independent	48,430	15.22%
Yury Guskov (incumbent)	Communist Party	36,842	11.58%
Vladimir Yenyagin	Independent	36,749	11.55%
Vyacheslav Kalyamin	Fatherland – All Russia	35,101	11.03%
Aleksey Grishkov	Yabloko	22,706	7.14%
Tamara Gudima	Independent	18,938	5.95%
Valery Tarayko	Independent	10,089	3.17%
Aleksandr Beletsky	Our Home – Russia	5,428	1.71%
against all		45,637	14.34%
Total		318,208	100%

=== 2003 ===
Summary of the 7 December 2003 Russian legislative election in the Kotlas constituency
Candidate	Party	Votes	%
Valery Malchikhin	United Russia	98,950	34.75%
Andrey Smantser	Independent	45,555	16.00%
Vladimir Yenyagin	Rodina	30,946	10.87%
Viktor Zverev	Independent	29,377	10.32%
Yevgeny Guryev	Communist Party	16,939	5.95%
Galina Likhanova	United Russian Party Rus'	14,510	5.10%
Aleksandr Korygin	People's Party	9,714	3.41%
against all		34,966	12.28%
Total		285,064	100%

=== 2016 ===
Summary of the 18 September 2016 Russian legislative election in the Kotlas constituency
Candidate	Party	Votes	%
Andrey Palkin	United Russia	76,004	43.25%
Irina Chirkova	A Just Russia	40,135	22.84%
Igor Arsentyev	Liberal Democratic Party	20,865	11.87%
Vasily Pavlov	Communist Party	18,581	10.57%
Yury Chesnokov	Yabloko	5,260	2.99%
Aleksey Guryev	Rodina	4,558	2.59%
Roman Fedulov	Communists of Russia	2,705	1.54%
Andrey Zhadchenko	Patriots of Russia	1,801	1.02%
Total		175,712	100%

=== 2021 ===
Summary of the 17-19 September 2021 Russian legislative election in the Kotlas constituency
Candidate	Party	Votes	%
Elena Vtorygina	United Russia	53,524	29.40%
Irina Chirkova	A Just Russia — For Truth	35,356	19.42%
Aleksandr Grevtsov	Communist Party	24,070	13.22%
Roman Novikov	New People	15,217	8.36%
Yekaterina Alekhintseva	Liberal Democratic Party	14,583	8.01%
Aleksandr Kozenkov	Yabloko	13,560	7.45%
Sergey Orekhanov	Party of Pensioners	6,628	3.64%
Oleg Mishukov	Rodina	4,651	2.55%
Oksana Kopteva	Russian Party of Freedom and Justice	3,899	2.14%
Aiman Tyukina	The Greens	3,331	1.83%
Total		182,040	100%

=== 2026 ===
Summary of the 18-20 September 2026 Russian legislative election in the Kotlas constituency
Candidate	Party	Votes	%
Maria Kharchenko	Liberal Democratic Party	48,015	26.55%
Natalya Ivashina	Communist Party	36,952	20.43%
Oleg Chernenko	A Just Russia	32,255	17.84%
Vladimir Kislov	Party of Pensioners	27,603	15.26%
Andrey Karakin	New People	17,920	9.91%
Maksim Piskunov	Yabloko	8,000	4.42%
Aleksandra Kudzagova	The Greens	4,101	2.27%
Total		180,847	100%
