= Eunice Olumide =

Model

Eunice Olumide MBE
- Born: Edinburgh, Scotland
- Occupations: Model, fashion designer, actor, presenter
- Years active: 2010–present
- Spouse: Steve Frew (m. 2018; div. 2021)
- Modeling information
- Height: 5 ft 9 in (175 cm)
- Hair color: Black
- Eye color: Brown
- Agency: Modelteam, Ford, AMQ, Select, Doveteam, VIVA, IMM, Mega
- Website: www.euniceolumide.com

Eunice Olumide is a Scottish fashion model and actor.

== Early life ==
Born in Edinburgh, Scotland, Olumide has dual British and Nigerian nationality. The name "Olumide" means "God has come" or "My Hero has come" in the Yoruba language. She grew up in Wester Hailes, on the outskirts of Edinburgh.

At Glasgow Caledonian University she graduated in communication and mass media with a first-class Bachelor of Arts. She then studied to Maters Degree Level and Queen Mary University of London and University Pennsylvania.

== Modelling career ==
At 15, Olumide was spotted shopping in Sauchiehall Street, Glasgow, and later scouted by Select models while visiting family in London. At the time she knew nothing about the fashion industry. She took a break from modelling to go to university. She has been signed with Model Team, KOKO, Nemesis, Mega, La Agenica, VIVA, AMQ, Ford and IMM Düsseldorf. She is recognised as Scotland's first black supermodel.

She has walked in fashion weeks and shoot in Japan, Paris, Milan, Barcelona, Poland, Germany, UAE, USA, Africa and the UK. She was the first black Scottish model to appear on the cover of Vogue.

Olumide has shot editorials for Dazed & Confused, Dry, London Fashion Week Daily, Dansk, Tank, I.D., Grazia, Luire Magazine Japan, Harpers Bazaar, Hunger, Oyster, Papercut, New York, Bahrain Confidential, WAD Magazine, Retro, InStyle, Fabulous, Italian Vogue and British Vogue. She has worked with Zandra Rhodes, Myleen Klass, Gio Pomodoro, Caryn Franklin, NKWO, JJ Noki, and designers including Swarovski, Christopher Kane, Jil Sander, Adidas, Evisu, Kswiss, Henry Holland, Jacob Kimmie, Prada, Georgina Harding, Gucci, Jean Paul Gaultier, Tom Ford, Alexander Wang and Jacob Birge. Olumide has modelled for Top Shop, Mulberry, Tommy Hilfiger, Ugg, Lee Jeans, Toms, The Body Shop, Alexander Wang, Vivienne Westwood, Bunmi Koko, New Look and Harris Tweed. She is also as an ambassador for Fashion Targets, Adopt an Intern, FAD and worked with Climate Revolution.

In 2018, she published her first book How To Get into Fashion, focusing on exploitation in the industry and the impact of Fast fashion She delivered a sold out tour of the UK including the Edinburgh International Book Festival, interviewed by Elizabeth Payton at The New York Times. As an equal rights campaigner and sustainability consultant she deliver a speech at the Houses of Commons and contributed to Equity's policy and etiquette to protect models in the work place.

== Fashion design ==
Olumide's debut spring summer collection was inspired by her Afro-Scottish background and ancestry, a balance of European and British style tailoring and traditionally African fabric and patterns. In 2016, she collaborated with Puma, Top Shop and Evisu on selected pieces, and produced her own accessories collection in 2017, consisting of spring summer and autumn winter sunglasses for men and women. In 2018, some of this was included in a permanent exhibition at National Museum of Scotland.

In 2019, Olumide produced an On-Schedule show for the British Fashion Council at London Fashion Week. NGRGFW included question and answer sessions featuring Dennis Calpone, Afuah Hirsch, Emma Dabiri and Nish Kumar as well as a fashion show, commissioned by Lambeth Council at Lambeth Town Hall. Olumide used the event to draw attention to the plight of the Windrush Generation illegally deported from the United Kingdom in 2018, after a mistake by the then Prime Minister Theresa May and Amber Rudd.

== Music career ==
Eunice Olumide is also Scotland first female rapper. She kept her life as a musician hidden using various pseudo names. It was brought to public attention by a journalist at the Independent in 2024. In 2026, she released her album Lovetree under her real name. She toured the UK, USA and EU. She has produced three albums and four EP's with multiple singles including a hip hop album in 2009 becoming the first Scottish rapper to be recognised by the MOBO awards. She has charted both in the UK and the Reggae Charts. She has toured the EU, UK, USA with Mos Def, The Roots, Talib Kweli, Lauryn Hill, The Game, Damien Marley, Nas, Skepta, Kano, Skinnyman as well as Jamican heavyweights including Yellowman, John Holt, The Skatellites,The Mighty Diamonds to mention a few. Over the years she has been part of Mud Family, Ruff Ryder's and Roots Manuva's Banana Klan.

In 2018, Olumide was involved in a charity Christmas song called "Rock With Rudolph", written and produced by Grahame and Jack Corbyn. Recorded by 26 personalities in aid of Great Ormond Street Hospital and released digitally on Saga Entertainment on 30 November 2018 under the artist name The Celebs. The song reached number two on the iTunes pop chart.

In 2020, amid the COVID-19 pandemic in the United Kingdom, Olumide returned to join The Celebs which now included Frank Bruno and X Factor winner Sam Bailey to raise money for both Alzheimer's Society and Action for Children. They recorded a new rendition of "Merry Christmas Everyone" by Shakin' Stevens and it was released digitally on 11 December 2020, on independent record label Saga Entertainment. The music video debuted exclusively on Good Morning Britain the day before release. The song peaked at number two on the iTunes pop chart.

In 2021, Olumide re-joined The Celebs to record a cover of The Beatles classic "Let It Be", in support of the Mind charity, released on 3 December 2021. Olumide was part of a choir of celebrities including Georgia Hirst, Anne Hegerty and Ivan Kaye, who were backing EastEnders actress Shona McGarty.

== Acting career ==
Olumide was the second Assistant Director and played a role in the BAFTA award winning feature film called Trouble Sleeping. In 2017, she also played Rosie in After Louise, and appeared in the short film "Some Sweet Oblivious Antidote" alongside Wunmi Mosaku and Lenny Henry. Other roles include Star Wars Rogue One, The Last Jedi and Absolutely Fabulous.

Olumide produced and directed a show Metamorph through Open Art Surgery at the Traverse Theatre and founded the brief existence of The Official Youth on the Fringe at the Edinburgh Festival Fringe, and starred in The Chicken Trial at the Pleasance courtyard. In 2017, she produced and directed A Work in Progress live at The Stand Comedy club. Stephen K Amos, Katheryn Ryan, Trevor Noah and Dane Baptiste also appeared.

Olumide made online comedy shorts titled "Afrish" for the BBC off the back of her Fringe show, "Afropoliticool," with Verona Rose and Ricardo P Lloyd as supporting leads. In 2024, she directed and produced Secret Lives: The Untold Story of British Hip Hop. The film was screened by BAFTA London and distributed by Picture House Cinemas which sold out across the United Kingdom.

== Television and broadcasting career ==
Olumide received an MBE for Broadcasting Arts and Charity and is BAFTA and ARIAS nominated. She has worked for BBC, Channel 5, ITV and Sky television. In 2025, she was selected as a celebrity judge on the Amazon TV series Restyle alongside Clara Amfo, Emma Willis, Stacey Dooley, Henry Holland and Laura Whitmore. She has also presented at the BAFTA Awards. In 2026 she launched her podcast "Level Up". interviewing guests including the First Minister of Scotland John Swinney, the previous First Minister of Scotland Humza Yousaf, Green Party's Ross Greer, Supermodel Veronica Webb and Outlander Star Richard Rankin and Kukab Stewart.

She has presented for BBC Radio 4 Pick of The Week, and has appeared on John Bishop's Britain and BBC Learning Zone. She produced an online interview for Vice on Reincarnated starring Snoop Dogg (also known as Snoop Lion).

She has appeared on numerous programmes including the Victoria Derbyshire Show, Secrets of The Royal Wardrobe, Lorraine, Good Morning Britain and BBC One's "Scotland's Treasures". She is the first supermodel to appear on BBC Question Time, trending worldwide for her contributions. In 2021, she made her Netflix debut starring in The Outsiders alongside Mo Gilligan, Ncuti Gatwa, Leigh-Anne Pinnock. In 2019, she interviewed Adrian Lester and Josie Rourke at the premier of the film Mary Queen of Scots for MOBO.

She presented BBC Radio Scotland's late night music show Music Match. She was a presenter and producer for the UK's first all black female show called The Sista Collective on BBC Radio 5 Live interviewing Director Amma Asante and Singer Jamelia

== Other activities ==
Olumide has written and contributed to four books including How to Get into Fashion, focusing on sustainability, diversity as well as protecting people from exploitation. Growing up Black in Britain with Stuart Lawrence, The Loud Black Girls Anthology edited by Bernardine Evaristo, Style and Substance with other authors including Charlotte Tilbury, Stanley Tucci, Zadie Smith, Bella Freud, Chloe Sevigny, Rachael Weisz and The Universal Cultural Declaration for UNESCO.

She is an ambassador for Zero Waste Scotland, for issues of conservation and sustainability, as well as for Fashion Targets. She has fund raised for charities including Children's Hospice Association Scotland, The Well Foundation, Love Music Hate Racism and is a global ambassador for Graduate Fashion Week. Olumide is a patron for Best Beginnings, and Adopt an Intern, helping to get women who have had a career break back into work.

In 2015, Olumide became the first black woman in Scotland to found her own art gallery representing artists including Richard Wilson, Tim Nobel, and Nick Walker. In 2019, she also became the first Scottish model to produce an on-schedule London Fashion Week show Next Generation Regeneration to raise awareness on the Windrush scandal. She delivered a key note speech at the Houses of Parliament which lead to an investigation on the impact of the textile industry on the environment. She instigated an initiative with the union called Equity to develop a framework and strategy to support fashion models in the UK. She also founded Enigmatic Production and Promotion, through the Prince's Business Youth Trust,.

== Awards and nominations ==
Olumide was nominated for the Model of the Year in the Scottish Fashion Awards, sponsored by Vogue in 2011, 2013, 2015. She won Model of the Year in 2018 at the BBE Awards. In 2017, she was featured alongside supermodels Stella Tennant, Winnie Harlow and Brenda Finn as one of the new breed of supermodels.

In November 2017, Olumide was awarded Member of the Order of the British Empire (MBE) in the 2017 Birthday Honours for services to broadcasting, the arts, and charity. The investiture ceremony was held at Buckingham Palace, with Prince Charles presenting the award.

In 2018, she was named as a Design Champion by V&A Dundee highlighting established names in design related industries in Scotland.

== Personal life ==
Olumide married Steve Frew in July 2018. They divorced in 2021.
