= Spiridonov =

Spiridonov (masculine) or Spiridonova (feminine) is a Slavic surname. Notable people with the surname include:

- Aleksey Spiridonov (athlete) (1951–1998), Soviet Russian hammer thrower
- Aleksey Spiridonov (born 1988), Russian volleyball player
- Alexander Spiridonov (born 1989), Russian politician
- Andrei Spiridonov (born 1982), Kazakhstani ice hockey player
- Emil Spiridonov (1925–1981), Soviet naval officer
- Ilia Spiridonov (born 1998), Russian pairs figure skater
- Julia Spiridonova – Yulka (born 1972), Bulgarian novelist and screenwriter
- Leonid Spiridonov (born 1980), Kazakhstani sport wrestler
- Maria Spiridonova (1884–1941), Russian revolutionary and assassin
- Maxim Spiridonov (born 1978), Russian ice hockey player
- Nikola Spiridonov (1938–2021), Bulgarian chess master
- Vadim Spiridonov (1944–1989), Russian film actor
