= Arkhangelsk constituency =

Constituency of the State Duma of the Russian Federation

Arkhangelsk single-member constituency
- Constituency of the Russian State Duma

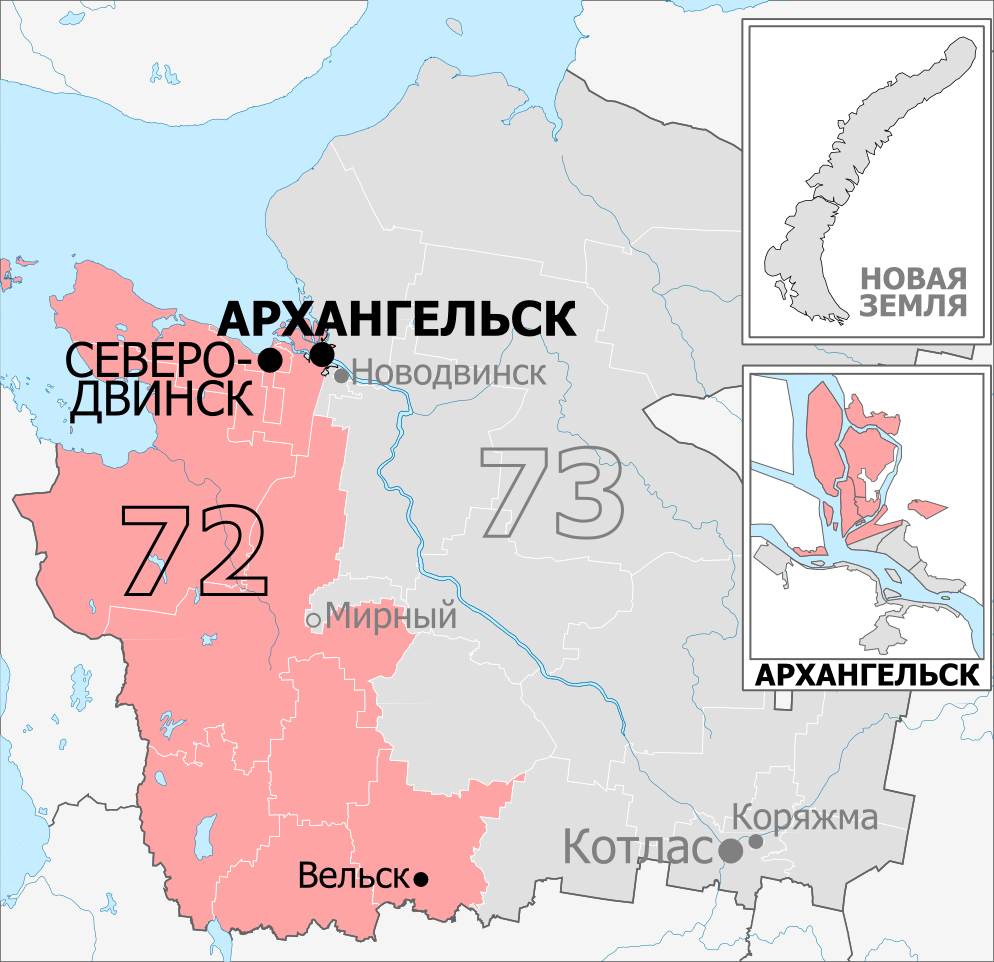
- Constituency boundaries since 2016
- Deputy: Igor Arsentyev; United Russia
- Federal subject: Arkhangelsk Oblast
- Districts: Arkhangelsk (Maymaksansky, Oktyabrsky, Severny, Solombalsky), Kargopolsky, Konoshsky, Nyandomsky, Onezhsky, Plesetsky, Primorsky (Ostrovnoye, Pertominskoye, Primorskoye, Solovetskoye, Zaostrovskoye), Severodvinsk, Velsky
- Voters: 404,341 (2026)

The Arkhangelsk constituency (No.76 (Note: No.60 in 1993-1995, No.59 in 1995-2003, No.61 in 2003-2007, No.72 in 2016–2026)) is a Russian legislative constituency in Arkhangelsk Oblast. The constituency covers northern half of Arkhangelsk and western Arkhangelsk Oblast.

The constituency has been represented since 2026 by United Russia deputy Igor Arsentyev, former Severodvinsk mayor and Member of Arkhangelsk Oblast Assembly of Deputies, who won the open seat after defeating one-term United Russia incumbent Aleksandr Spiridonov in the primary.

== Boundaries ==
1993–2003: Arkhangelsk, Leshukonsky District, Mezensky District, Pinezhsky District, Primorsky District, Severodvinsk, Solovetsky District, Arctic Ocean islands
The constituency covered the entirety of Arkhangelsk, major shipyard Severodvinsk and northern Arkhangelsk Oblast, including all of Arctic Ocean islands.

2003–2007: Arkhangelsk, Leshukonsky District, Mezensky District, Novodvinsk, Pinezhsky District, Primorsky District, Severodvinsk, Solovetsky District, Arctic Ocean islands
After 2003 the constituency was slightly changes as it gained the industrial city of Novodvinsk from Kotlas constituency.

2016–present: Arkhangelsk (Maymaksansky, Oktyabrsky, Severny, Solombalsky), Kargopolsky District, Konoshsky District, Nyandomsky District, Onezhsky District, Plesetsky District, Primorsky District (Ostrovnoye, Pertominskoye, Primorskoye, Solovetsky District, Zaostrovskoye), Severodvinsk, Velsky District
The constituency was re-created for the 2016 election and it retained northern half of Arkhangelsk, Severodvinsk and Solovetsky Islands, losing the rest to Kotlas constituency. This seat gained western Arkhangelsk Oblast from the former Kotlas constituency.

== Members elected ==
Election	Member	Party
1993	Sergey Shulgin	Civic Union
1995	Vasily Grishin	Independent
1999	Aleksandr Piskunov (Note: appointed Auditor of the Accounts Chamber of Russia in April 2001)	Fatherland – All Russia
2003	Vladimir Krupchak	Independent
2007	Proportional representation - no election by constituency	
2011	Proportional representation - no election by constituency	
2016	Dmitry Yurkov	United Russia
2021	Aleksandr Spiridonov	United Russia
2026	Igor Arsentyev	United Russia

== Election results ==
=== 1993 ===
Summary of the 12 December 1993 Russian legislative election in the Arkhangelsk constituency
Candidate	Party	Votes	%
Sergey Shulgin	Civic Union	133,809	47.75%
Valentina Konovalova	Independent	71,226	25.42%
Ivan Degtyaryov	Independent	15,466	5.52%
against all		43,596	15.56%
Total		280,205	100%

=== 1995 ===
Summary of the 17 December 1995 Russian legislative election in the Arkhangelsk constituency
Candidate	Party	Votes	%
Vasily Grishin	Independent	95,818	27.53%
Pavel Pozdeyev	Independent	65,187	18.73%
Galina Anisimova	Independent	26,702	6.76%
Yury Grishin	Independent	25,333	7.28%
Mikhail Danilov	Democratic Choice of Russia – United Democrats	21,393	6.15%
Yury Shcherbachev	Stanislav Govorukhin Bloc	13,845	3.98%
Nikolay Zalyvsky	Social Democrats	13,465	3.87%
Sergey Kurochkin	Liberal Democratic Party	12,483	3.59%
Anatoly Koltunov	Power to the People	9,457	2.72%
Igor Zaborsky	Independent	7,799	2.24%
Vladimir Lushin	Independent	3,021	0.87%
against all		46,106	13.24%
Total		348,103	100%

=== 1999 ===
Summary of the 19 December 1999 Russian legislative election in the Arkhangelsk constituency
Candidate	Party	Votes	%
Aleksandr Piskunov	Fatherland – All Russia	75,497	23.30%
Vasily Grishin (incumbent)	Independent	50,978	15.74%
Tatyana Podyakova	Independent	38,770	11.97%
Pyotr Skidan	Independent	28,990	8.95%
Mikhail Silantyev	Liberal Democratic Party	17,558	5.42%
Viktor Shiryayev	Russian Socialist Party	15,519	4.79%
Igor Zaborsky	Kedr	12,389	3.82%
Viktor Shershnev	Independent	8,909	2.75%
Ivan Bentsa	Independent	8,542	2.64%
Aleksandr Krasnoshtan	Independent	7,122	2.20%
Sergey Perervus	Independent	4,767	1.47%
Vladislav Goldin	Spiritual Heritage	4,380	1.35%
Sergey Startsev	Independent	3,830	1.18%
against all		42,231	13.04%
Total		323,963	100%

=== 2001 ===
The results of the by-election were annulled due to low turnout (22.13%).

Summary of the 7 October 2001 by-election in the Arkhangelsk constituency
Candidate	Party	Votes	%
Tamara Rumyantseva	Independent	58,811	50.86%
Nikolay Malakov	Independent	13,517	11.69%
Aleksandr Novikov	Independent	10,420	9.01%
Aleksandr Chaplinsky	Independent	5,983	5.17%
Yelena Pozhidayeva	Independent	4,186	3.62%
Mikhail Silantyev	Independent	3,200	2.77%
Valentin Gintov	Independent	2,715	2.35%
Pavel Nozhnin	Independent	1,022	0.88%
against all		13,834	11.96%
Total		115,637	100%

=== 2003 ===
Summary of the 7 December 2003 Russian legislative election in the Arkhangelsk constituency
Candidate	Party	Votes	%
Vladimir Krupchak	Independent	115,176	37.27%
Tamara Rumyantseva	United Russia	63,086	20.41%
Yury Guskov	Communist Party	21,793	7.05%
Mikhail Silantyev	Liberal Democratic Party	14,051	4.55%
Mikhail Sokolov	Yabloko	10,098	3.27%
Galina Zhuravleva	Independent	9,342	3.02%
Natalya Korzhinevskaya	Agrarian Party	5,151	1.67%
Andrey Georgiyev	Independent	3,977	1.29%
Alfiya Grishko	Independent	2,740	0.89%
Pavel Nozhnin	People's Republican Party of Russia	2,401	0.78%
Yevgeny Kislov	Party of Russia's Rebirth-Russian Party of Life	1,874	0.61%
Aleksandr Selyagin	Great Russia – Eurasian Union	1,344	0.43%
against all		54,361	17.59%
Total		309,463	100%

=== 2016 ===
Summary of the 18 September 2016 Russian legislative election in the Arkhangelsk constituency
Candidate	Party	Votes	%
Dmitry Yurkov	United Russia	55,025	34.43%
Olga Yepifanova	A Just Russia	38,742	24.24%
Aleksandr Novikov	Communist Party	22,576	14.13%
Sergey Pivkov	Liberal Democratic Party	20,709	12.96%
Mikhail Butorin	People's Freedom Party	4,645	2.91%
Mikhail Silantyev	Rodina	4,535	2.84%
Andrey Churakov	Yabloko	3,797	2.38%
Yury Rusakov	Communists of Russia	2,543	1.59%
Vyacheslav Yerykanov	Patriots of Russia	1,958	1.23%
Total		159,799	100%

=== 2021 ===
Summary of the 17-19 September 2021 Russian legislative election in the Arkhangelsk constituency
Candidate	Party	Votes	%
Aleksandr Spiridonov	United Russia	49,635	28.93%
Oleg Mandrykin	Yabloko	30,125	17.56%
Nadezhda Vinogradova	Communist Party	27,469	16.01%
Vladimir Sukharev	Liberal Democratic Party	15,685	9.14%
Igor Gubinskikh	New People	12,288	7.16%
Oleg Chernenko	A Just Russia — For Truth	11,576	6.75%
Sergey Filonov	Party of Pensioners	6,313	3.68%
Yaroslav Savichev	Rodina	4,031	2.35%
Dmitry Kargapoltsev	Communists of Russia	3,890	2.27%
Vladimir Kogut	Russian Party of Freedom and Justice	3,239	1.89%
Total		171,593	100%

=== 2026 ===
Summary of the 18-20 September 2026 Russian legislative election in the Arkhangelsk constituency
Candidate	Party	Votes	%
Igor Arsentyev	United Russia	66,064	37.94%
Aleksandr Grevtsov	Communist Party	28,247	16.22%
Kirill Aleskerov	Liberal Democratic Party	19,464	11.18%
Yulia Zhdanova	A Just Russia	15,353	8.82%
Vadim Laptev	Yabloko	14,398	8.27%
Vladislav Virivsky	New People	12,031	6.91%
Viktor Tikhonov	Party of Pensioners	9,918	5.70%
Inga Yatsenko	Rodina	2,176	1.25%
Stepan Solovyov	The Greens	1,819	1.04%
Total		174,132	100%
