= Honor Up =

- Film poster
- Directed by: Damon Dash
- Written by: Damon Dash; Kevin Bennett
- Produced by: Damon Dash; Carrie Leigh; Raquel M. Horn
- Starring: Damon Dash; Cam'ron; Daniel Jenkins; Murda Mook; Nicholas Turturro; Stacey Dash
- Distributed by: Lions Gate Entertainment
- Release date: February 16, 2018
- Running time: 84 minutes
- Country: United States
- Language: English

Honor Up is a 2018 action film directed and co-written by Damon Dash and executive produced by Kanye West. Starring Dash, Cam'ron, Daniel Jenkins, Murda Mook, Nicholas Turturro and Stacey Dash, the film was released on February 16, 2018 to generally negative reviews.

== Plot ==
A drug lord becomes embroiled in a fierce fight to maintain his honor after a deadly gun attack in Manhattan's neighborhood of Harlem.

== Cast ==
- Damon Dash as OG/Narrator
- Cam'ron as JR
- Nicholas Turturro as Detective Kean
- Daniel Jenkins as Primo
- Murda Mook as Mike
- Stacey Dash as Tara
- Smoke DZA as Dee
- Smokey Suarez as Flip

== Reception ==
Los Angeles Times critic Michael Rechtshaffen stated: "A criminally inept throwback to '90s urban gangsta movie posturing that plays like a stone-faced version of the 1996 Wayans brothers spoof, Don't Be a Menace to South Central While Drinking Your Juice in the Hood". According to Glenn Kenny of The New York Times, the movie "sometimes manages to bring a scary whiff of the street into its sounds and images".
