= Sugarev =

Sugarev (Bulgarian: Сугарев) is a Bulgarian masculine surname; its feminine counterpart is Sugareva. It may refer to the following notable people:

- Edvin Sugarev (born 1953), Bulgarian poet and politician
- Georgi Sugarev Bulgarian revolutionary
- Tea Sugareva (born 1989), Bulgarian theatre director, drama teacher, and poet
