= Sergei Shulgin =

Sergei Shulgin may refer to:

- Sergei Shulgin (footballer)
- Sergei Shulgin (politician)
