= Hudyma =

Hudyma (Ukrainian: Гудима), also transliterated Gudyma or Gudima, is a Ukrainian surname. Notable people with the surname include:

- Borys Hudyma (born 1941), Ukrainian diplomat and politician
- Lindsay Hudyma (born 1986), Canadian curler
- Olesya Hudyma (born 1980), Ukrainian painter
- Volodymyr Hudyma (born 1990), Ukrainian footballer
- Tamara Gudima (1936–2021), Russian politician
