= Maria Kharchenko =

Russian politician

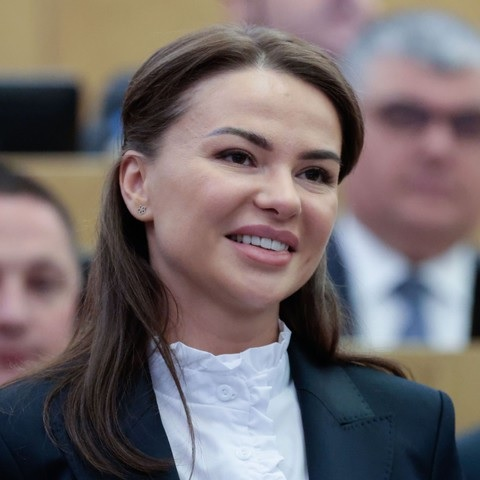

Member of the State Duma for Arkhangelsk Oblast
- Incumbent
- Assumed office 30 September 2026
- Preceded by: Elena Vtorygina
- Constituency: Kotlas (No. 77)

Member of the State Duma (party list seat)
- In office 15 April 2026 – 30 September 2026
- Preceded by: Vasilina Kuliyeva

Personal details
- Born: 23 November 1991 (age 34) Arkhangelsk, Arkhangelsk Oblast, Russian SFSR, Soviet Union
- Party: Liberal Democratic Party of Russia
- Education: Northern (Arctic) Federal University

Maria Borisovna Kharchenko (Russian: Мария Борисовна Харченко; born 23 November 1991) is a Russian politician who has been a member of the State Duma since 2026.

== See also ==
- 8th State Duma
