= Murda Mook =

American rapper

- Born: John Julius Ancrum; December 15, 1984 (age 41); Boston, Massachusetts, U.S.
- Origin: Manhattan, New York City, U.S.
- Genres: Hip hop
- Years active: 2002-present
- Labels: Conglomerate; Ruff Ryders Indy; Black Face Ent.(former)

John Julius Ancrum, better known by his stage names Murda Mookie and Mook, is an American rapper based out of Harlem, New York.

He is an East-Coast street rapper that is considered a pioneer of rap battles, and has influenced the majority of modern battle rappers today. Alongside Troy "Smack White" Mitchell, he grew in popularity among fans of street hip-hop DVDs due to his delivery, crowd control, bars, and consistency. He is considered a legend and a flag bearer for the primary era of battle rap

He is a founding member of the Harlem-based rap group Dot Mob, consisting of Mook, his cousin T-Rex, and Dutch Brown, affiliated with A&R Louie Da 13th. Trav Da Assasin. Former members included NymLo (known as NymDot at the time) and K-Shine. Associates include Watts rapper Daylyt, Pittsburgh rapper Real Deal, Baltimore rapper Tay Roc, and hype-man/producer Sho Gotti.

== Early life ==
John Ancrum was born in Boston, Massachusetts but raised in Harlem and Identifies as a New Yorker. He played basketball at Fordham Preparatory School in The Bronx.

=== College basketball career ===
After Fordham Prep, Ancrum attended Elms College in Chicopee, Massachusetts, where he majored in Marketing.

==== Career statistics ====
Year	Team	GP	GS	MPG	FG%	3P%	FT%	RPG	APG	SPG	BPG	PPG
2006–07	Elms Blazers	26	-	-	.383	.316	.678	2.3	4.8	1.3	0	8.7
Career		26	-	-	.383	.316	.678	2.3	4.8	1.3	0	8.7

== Career ==
Murda Mook began his career as a battle rapper, facing well-known Harlem rappers such as T-Rex and Loaded Lux. His breakthrough performance was featured on a 2002 S.M.A.C.K. DVD against Jae Millz, who had recently battled E. Ness and was broadcast on MTV's Making the Band. The combination of these two rappers, both with growing followings at the time, resulted in one of the most influential rap battles of that period. Mook later faced rappers such as Party Arty, Serius Jones, and Philly-native Young Hot in 2008. This was due to his original opponents Cassidy and Reed Dollaz backing out.

Mook is considered a living 'legend' in the modern-battle rap world, having influenced almost all of the Ultimate Rap League. Outside of S.M.A.C.K., he also made a brief appearance on MTV2's Monday Night Fight Klub where he battled against up-and-coming rappers such as Verse, Cardi aka. Deuce One, and most notably French Montana, who went under the name Young French at the time. His next battles were a return to SMACK/URL to battle Iron Solomon on the iconic Summer Madness 2, and a rematch against Loaded Lux on fuse TV's Total Slaughter battle event. Four years later, Mook returned to battle rap on R.B.E to face Aye Verb. His most recent battle was a 2on2 match against T-Top and Brizz Rawsteen (Mook paired up with Calicoe) at U.R.L’s Summer Impact Reloaded event. The battle ended during the first round due to altercations. Mook also called out Drake to a rap battle at a URL event. However, the two have claimed to have no problems with each other.

Mook's debut album Murder He Wrote was released under Black Face Ent. in late 2007. He has released and been featured on many New York mixtapes since.

In 2011, Mook signed to Ruff Ryders and recorded the anthem "You Know (Ruff Ryders Anthem 11)". However, after the record label became independent, Mook's music did not see a release. Instead, he re-signed to Busta Rhymes Conglomerate record label in 2016. His future album is still in the works. He was involved with a new Dot Mob mixtape titled "Voices" in 2016, hosted by DJ Whoo Kid.

In 2012, Mook appeared on the Ruff Ryders Cypher of the BET Hip Hop Awards.

In November 2022, Mook battled Compton legend Geechi Gotti at Homecoming event.

== Discography ==
Albums

- The Untouchable (2005)
- Murda He Wrote (2007)

Mixtapes

- Voices w/ Dot Mob (2016)
- Eazy Does It (2014)
- Street Smart (2012)
- Countdown to Murda (2010)
- 401K (2011)

Singles

- "Preach" (2012)
- "You Know" (2011)
- "Tech 9" w/ Remy Ma & T-Rex (2007)
