= Milena Nikolova =

Bulgarian writer (born 1984)

- Милена Николова
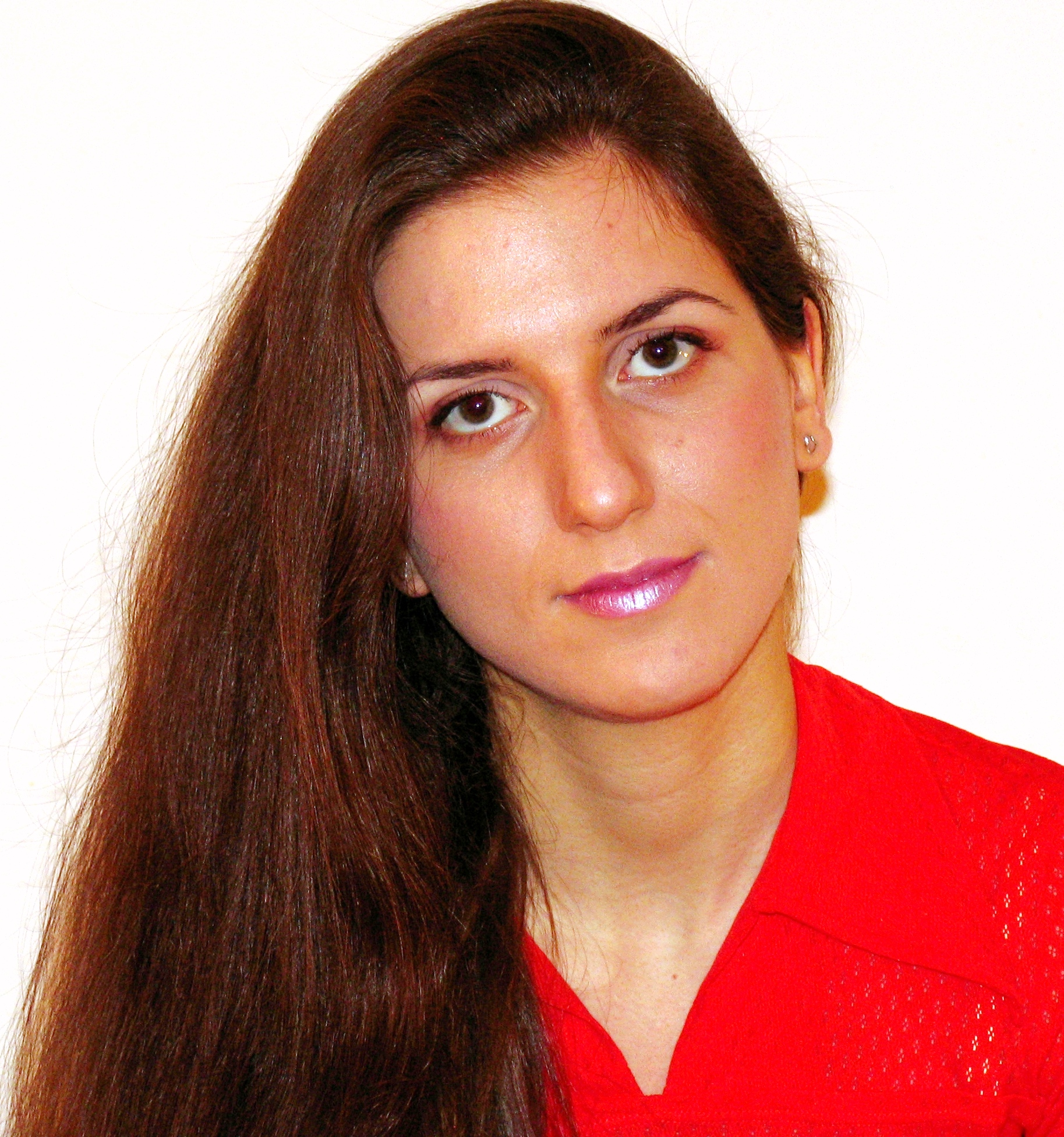
- Born: 31 October 1984 (age 41); Sliven, Bulgaria
- Occupation: Writer

Milena Nikolova (Bulgarian: Милена Николова; born 31 October 1984, in Sliven) is a Bulgarian writer.

== Life ==
Milena Nikolova attended the High school of foreign languages in her hometown Sliven where she studied the English and German languages. In 2003 she entered the University of National and World Economy in Sofia and in 2008 she obtained a bachelor's degree in International economic affairs. In the same year she applied for a Master's course in New Bulgarian University, also in Sofia. There, in 2009 she obtained a master's degree in "International Business". In the same year she also got post-graduate diplomas in Physiotherapy and in Spa-Therapy from the National Sports Academy "Vassil Levski" in Sofia.

In 2011, Milena Nikolova obtained her second master's degree in "English and methodology".

When she was a young student, Milena Nikolova spent 8 years as a member of a creative writing class in the United school of arts "Misho Todorov" in Sliven, which was led by the writer Evgenia Genova.

== Creative experience ==
She has won two times the international competition "Europe at School" (1999 und 2004), organised by the Council of Europe, the European Parliament and the European Cultural Foundation.

In the 51st International Schankar Competition Milena Nikolova has won a silver medal.

She has won first places for poetry and prose in the following national literature competitions: "Art against Drugs", "Petya Dubarova", "Dora Gabe", "Vitoshko lale" (A Tulip from Vitosha), "Yujni slantsa" (Southern Suns), "My child’s dreams", "We Live in the Land of Botev" and "The Love without Which We Cannot Exist".

A lot of her works are published in Bulgarian language in newspapers such as: "Dneven Trud", "Sega", "24 chasa" (Engl. "24 Hours")), in magazines such as: "Rodna Rech" (Bg. Родна реч), "Plamak" (Engl. "Flame"), "Jajda", "Slovoto dnes", "Noviyat puls", "Literaturen front"), on web pages ("Liternet", "Listopad", "Az-jenata") and emitted on the Radio and TV programmes.

She has translated poems written by American, English, German and Macedonian poets into Bulgarian.

Since 2008 she is a member of the Union of the Bulgarian writers.

In 2013 and 2014 she has won two times the Prize for a young author in the National Bulgarian poetry competition "Binio Ivanov"" in Kjustendil.

In 2014 she was a member of the jury of the International poetry competition "Write, share, get read" and a member of the jury of the National Bulgarian poetry competition "The Christian family – the perfect way to love the other one".

Poems of Milena Nikolova are published in the "XXI CENTURY WORLD LITERATURE" book (An International anthology of poetry and fiction), Publisher: Kafla Intercontinental; First edition (2016), Language: English, ISBN 978-9384023096.

=== PoemTherapy ===
In May 2012 she founded the blog PoemTherapy on Facebook. It is a free, financially independent online magazine for Bulgarian and international culture. Here she shares her works and the works of Bulgarian and foreign authors, as well.

In December 2014 Milena Nikolova founded the First international poetry competition in memory of her teacher Evgenia Genova which is called under two of her verses: "If my heart is set on fire, the Universe will get flooded into love."

== Books ==
- Любов по време на дъга. (Love in the Rainbow's Time) Plamak, Sofia, 2003. ISBN 954-8046-65-2.
- Сълзи в джобовете. (Teardrops in the Pockets) Bulgarski pisatel, Sofia, 2005. ISBN 954-443-520-4.
- Обяснение в благодарност. (Explanation in Thankfulness) Obnova, Sliven, 2015. ISBN 978-954-948-673-5.
- Eine Sonnenbrille für die Sonne (Sunglasses for the Sun), Books on Demand, Norderstedt, 2016. ISBN 978-383-911-027-0.
