= Milkana G. Palavurova =

Milkana Palavurova (Bulgarian: Милкана Палавурова) (born September 1974) is a Bulgarian writer, DVD producer, Ashtanga Yoga Practitioner, and former model. She produced, edited and distributed the first yoga practice home-guide DVD in the Kingdom of Bahrain, Middle East, which has also been translated into Bulgarian.

== Yoga ==
Milkana G. acquired her certification in traditional yoga practices in Tamil Nadu, India with Dr. Scintil Kumar. She became the first Bulgarian Experienced Yoga Teacher registered with USA Yoga Alliance, Bahrain Ministry of Health, and Ayurveda organization in India. She has written numerous articles for different publications and internet sites on yoga about its use for total stress relief. Some of the earnings of the articles have been donated to the National Autism Association, USA, to educate and empower individuals and families affected by autism and other neurological disorders. Her PhD work is in the field of Health Psychology, proving and discovering facts and information on body-mind connection theories. She contributed to the acceptance of yoga as a therapy in the Middle East.

In October, 2007, Milkana G. and her partner at the time Karina Gorska, established the first officially registered yoga practice in the Kingdom of Bahrain. It was called Lotus Yoga Studio. Milkana G. had become known for her article on yoga and religion, where she made a comparison between Muslim prayers and yoga positions.

== Modeling ==
Milkana's modeling work entailed photoshoots for organizations such as Batelco, American Express Saudi Arabia, Bank of Bahrain and Kuwait, National Bank of Bahrain, Woman This Month (a fashion media publication), Bahrain Confidential, and many others.
