= Steve Frew =

British artistic gymnast

- Full name: Steven Frew
- Born: 6 February 1973 (age 53) Falkirk, Scotland
- Height: 5 ft 8 in (173 cm)
- Spouse: Eunice Olumide (m. 2018; div. 2021)

Gymnastics career
- Discipline: Men's artistic gymnastics
- Country represented: (United Kingdom) Great Britain; Scotland; (20 years)
Medal record
Men's artistic gymnastics
Representing Scotland
Commonwealth Games
Gold medal – first place	2002 Manchester	Rings

Steven Frew (born 6 February 1973, in Falkirk) is a Scottish artistic gymnast. He has represented Scotland and Great Britain over 100 times at various international gymnastics competitions.

== Gymnastics career ==
He took gold in the men's rings at the 2002 Commonwealth Games in Manchester, England at the age of 28. This was the first Commonwealth Games gold medal in gymnastics for Scotland.

He competed in his fifth Commonwealth Games in Melbourne in 2006, where he qualified for the men's rings final.

His 2002 victory was significant as he had only been able to devote himself to gymnastics on a part-time basis, owing to limited funding for the sport in Scotland at that time, and had not been considered as a possible medallist. Prior to his 2002 success, Steve worked as a fitness instructor at the Livingwell Health Club in Maida-Vale, London.

== Post-gymnastics career ==
Frew has also worked as an athlete mentor for the Sky Sports Living for Sport Programme, run by the Youth Sport Trust.

Frew has also appeared as a competitor on television in the BBC Three series Hercules, and was a member of the team representing Glasgow in the ITV game show Simply the Best.

Steve Frew opened Auchterarder Gymnastics Club in Perthshire, and as a patron he passes on his coaching skills on a regular basis.

During the London 2012 Olympic Games, he served as a gymnastics commentator at the North Greenwich Arena.

As of 2 February 2017 Steve helps out in Aberdeen for active schools, helping children improve their sports and inspiring them, He works at schools such as Dyce Academy in Aberdeen, Scotland, and many schools and organisations throughout the world.

Frew was a competitor on the 2017 ITV show 'Ninja Warrior UK' achieving a place in the final. (top 15 competitors), finishing 11th place overall.

Frew married Eunice Olumide in July 2018. They divorced in 2021.
