= Alexenia Dimitrova =

Bulgarian journalist and author

Alexenia Dimitrova (Bulgarian: Алексения Димитрова) is a Bulgarian journalist and author who started her career in the late 1980s. She works for 24 chasa, the second largest Bulgarian daily. Her favorite topics are secret archives of the Cold War era, shadow affairs and corruption, money laundering, suspicious ownership and property, and secret societies. She profiled finding and reuniting lost people all over the world. For her series of publications about missing persons that started in July 2002, she received Chernorizets Hrabar (Bulgaria's most prestigious award for investigative journalism) in November 2004. She was nominated for the same award in 2003.

Dimitrova has published more than 4,000 stories in 40 media in Bulgaria, the USA, Russia, and Great Britain. Her book The Iron Fist - Inside the Bulgarian and American Secret Archives was published in March 2005 in London and in English by Artnik Publishing. The same book (under the title The War of the Spies) was published in Bulgaria in October 2005.

== Early life ==
Dimitrova graduated from Sofia University in 1986 and has specializations on journalism in the World Press Institute, the University of Missouri, Reuters, European Center for Journalism (Netherlands), and Danish School of Journalism. Dimitrova is a licensed lecturer in journalistic investigations in Bulgaria within the framework of SouthEast European Network for Professionalism in the Media.

== Career ==
She worked as a local trainer for the BBC on investigative journalism during a 3-year project implementing the Self-regulation and Code of Ethics of Bulgarian Media. She is one of 12 members of the Press Complaint Commission in Bulgaria.

She has spoken at seminars and other events of investigative journalism in Bulgaria, Denmark, Croatia, Netherlands, Austria, Moldavia, Armenia, Slovenia, Germany, Bosnia, Albania, Azerbaijan and Turkey.

She is a member of the union of Bulgarian journalists, the Investigative Journalists Association; International Federation of Journalists (IFJ); and is a founding member of South East Europe Media Organisation (SEEMO).

== Affiliations with former communist secret service agencies ==
In December 2009 Dimitrova (agent “Vladimir”) was exposed as one of the Bulgarian print journalists who were operatives of the Committee for State Security – the secret police and intelligence of the former communist regime. Others included the former Editor-in-Chief of 24 Chasa Daily, Valeri Naydenov, (under the name “Sasho”) and fellow journalist Pencho Kovachev (agent “Maxim”), who also worked for 24 Chasa Daily.

Dmitrova contributed from June 15, 1988, to January 21, 1990 - a department whose main goal was the ideological control over the intelligentsia, universities and clergy of communist Bulgaria.

== Controversies ==
Dimitrova's communist past remains controversial to Bulgarian independent media because of her continued cooperation with independent Western European media organizations, whose core values do not require their members to avoid collaboration with former communist secret services.
