= Svetla Vassileva (publicist) =

Bulgarian publicist and blogger (born 1964)

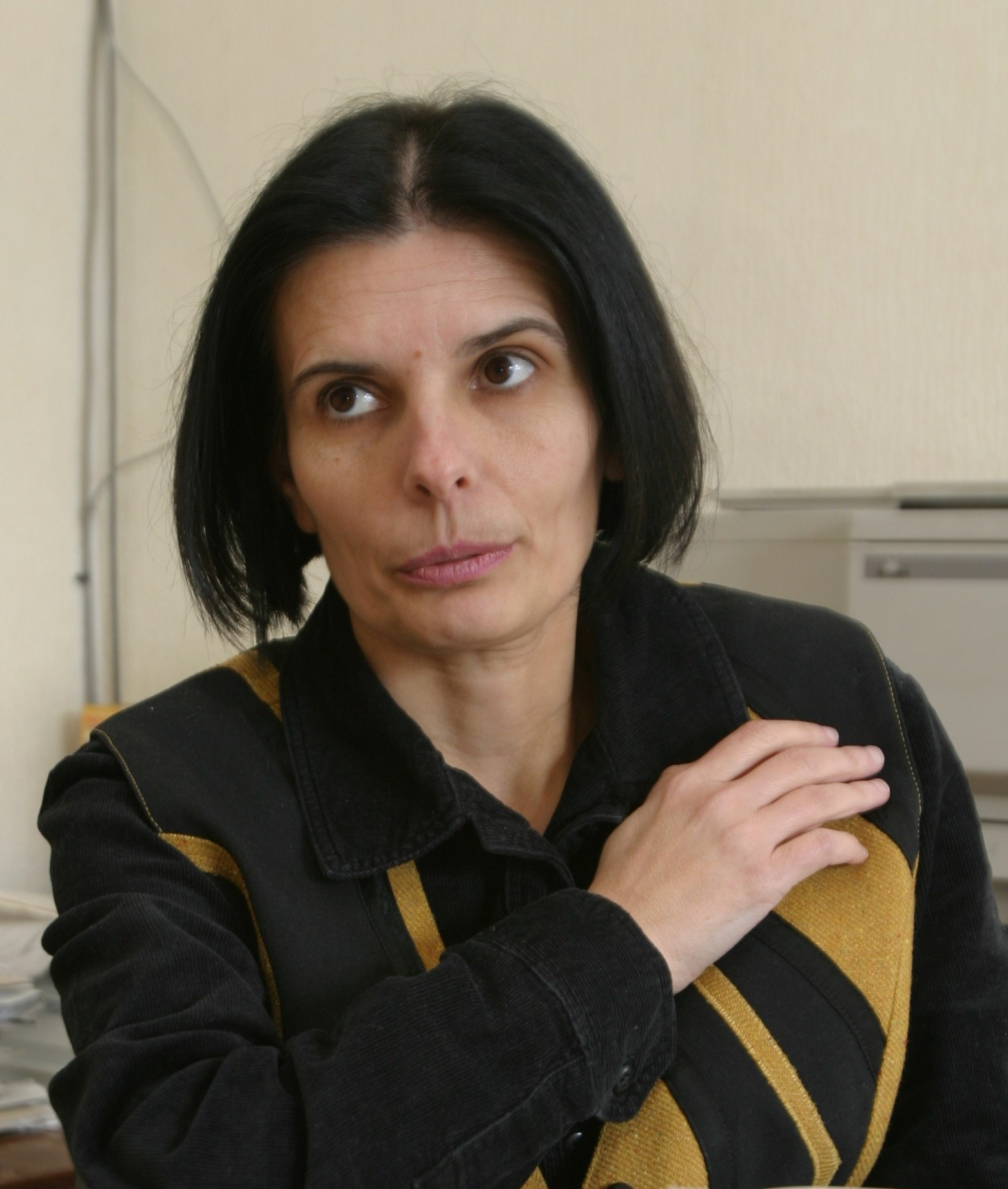
- Bulgarian publicist and blogger
- Born: April 1, 1964 (age 62); Pleven, Bulgaria
- Occupation: Publicist

Svetla Vassileva (or "Vasileva", Bulgarian: Светла Василева, born 1 April 1964) is a Bulgarian publicist and blogger.

Born in Pleven, she graduated from the Sofia University "St. Kliment Ohridski" and the Herzen University in Saint Petersburg, she worked briefly at the Bulgarian Scientific Research Institute of Education in Sofia.

She wrote a dissertation on "Inclusion of children from preschool to universal moral values." Vassileva is co-author of "Concept for the development of public preschool education in Bulgaria", "Concept for the socialization of socially disadvantaged Romani children" (under the auspices of UNICEF), "White Paper on Pravets" (2010) and the book Pravets. Chronicles of the private city (2011).

She is author of dozens of articles on topical issues of public life in the years of Bulgaria's transition to democracy and market economy, published in Bulgarian and foreign Internet and print media (including publications of the European Union) as well as her personal blog.

Information from her essay "The private cities of Bulgaria" (2008) has become part of the book The New Bulgarian Demons by the German investigative journalist Jürgen Roth.

As a guest of the morning show Hello, Bulgaria on NOVA television on November 14, 2008, she asserted Pravets as "the first private city", owned by the representative of the oil giant Lukoil in Bulgaria, Valentin Zlatev, prompting a flagrant dismissal of high-ranking journalist Georgi Koritarov.

Vassileva is co-founder of several non-profit associations.

She was awarded the "Golden Key" for 2014 in the category "journalism" of the Access to Information Programme.

Since 2017 she has been an expert in the team of the President of the Republic of Bulgaria Rumen Radev.

== Works ==
- Koleva, Irina. Koncepcija za socializacija na deca ot romski proischod v neravnostojno socialno položenie : v uslovijata na detskata gradina [Concept socialization of Roma children in socially disadvantaged], S., 1994, ISBN 954-8525-02-X, co-author
- Tsvetkov, Pavlin; Vasileva, Svetla; Nikolova, Proletina (2011). Правец. Хрониките на частния град [Pravets. Chronicles of the private city] (in Bulgarian). Сдружение за насърчаване на гражданска активност. ISBN 978-954-92718-1-2.
