= Elena Vtorygina =

Russian politician

- Елена Вторыгина
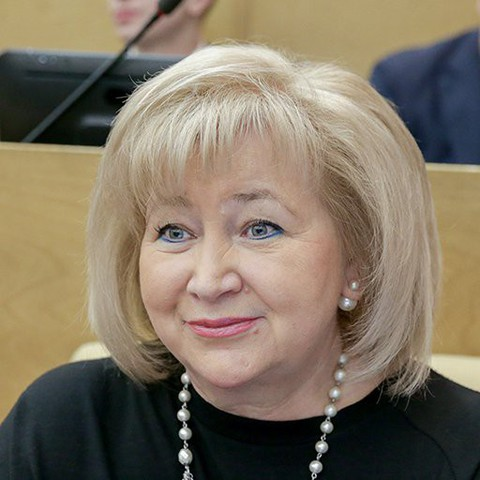
- Vtorygina in 2016

Member of the State Duma for Arkhangelsk Oblast
- Incumbent
- Assumed office 12 October 2021
- Preceded by: Andrey Palkin
- Constituency: Kotlas (No. 73)

Member of the State Duma (Party List Seat)
- In office 3 April 2013 – 12 October 2021
- In office 24 December 2007 – 24 May 2011

Personal details
- Born: 17 August 1957 (age 68) Arkhangelsk, RSFSR, USSR
- Party: United Russia (from 2011); A Just Russia (until 2011)
- Education: RANEPA

Elena Andreyevna Vtorygina (v-toh-REE-gee-nah; Russian: Елена Андреевна Вторыгина; born 17 August 1957) is a Russian political figure and a deputy of the 5th, 6th, 7th, and 8th State Dumas.

In 1979, Vtorygina started working as the Chairman of the trade union committee of the specialized school 15. From 1982 to 1986, she was the methodologist in the trade union committee of the Solombala Pulp and Paper Mill. In the 1990s, Vtorygina became the head of the regional public organization "Union of Business Women". In 1999, she started working at the administration of the Arkhangelsk Oblast. In December 2004, she was elected deputy of the Arkhangelsk Oblast Assembly of Deputies of the 4th convocation. In 2007, she was elected deputy of the 5th. On May 18, 2011, she voluntarily resigned the mandate in favor of Sergey Mironov after he lost his place at the Federation Council. In 2012, she was appointed Advisor to the Governor of the Arkhangelsk Oblast Igor Orlov. In March 2013, Vladimir Pekhtin resigned his deputy powers ahead of schedule, and on April 3, Elena Vtorigina received a vacated mandate and became a member of the 6th State Duma. In 2016 and 2021, she was elected deputy of the 7th, and 8th State Dumas, respectively.

== Sanctions ==
She was sanctioned by the UK government in 2022 in relation to the Russo-Ukrainian War.
