= Albena Stambolova =

Bulgarian psychologist, writer

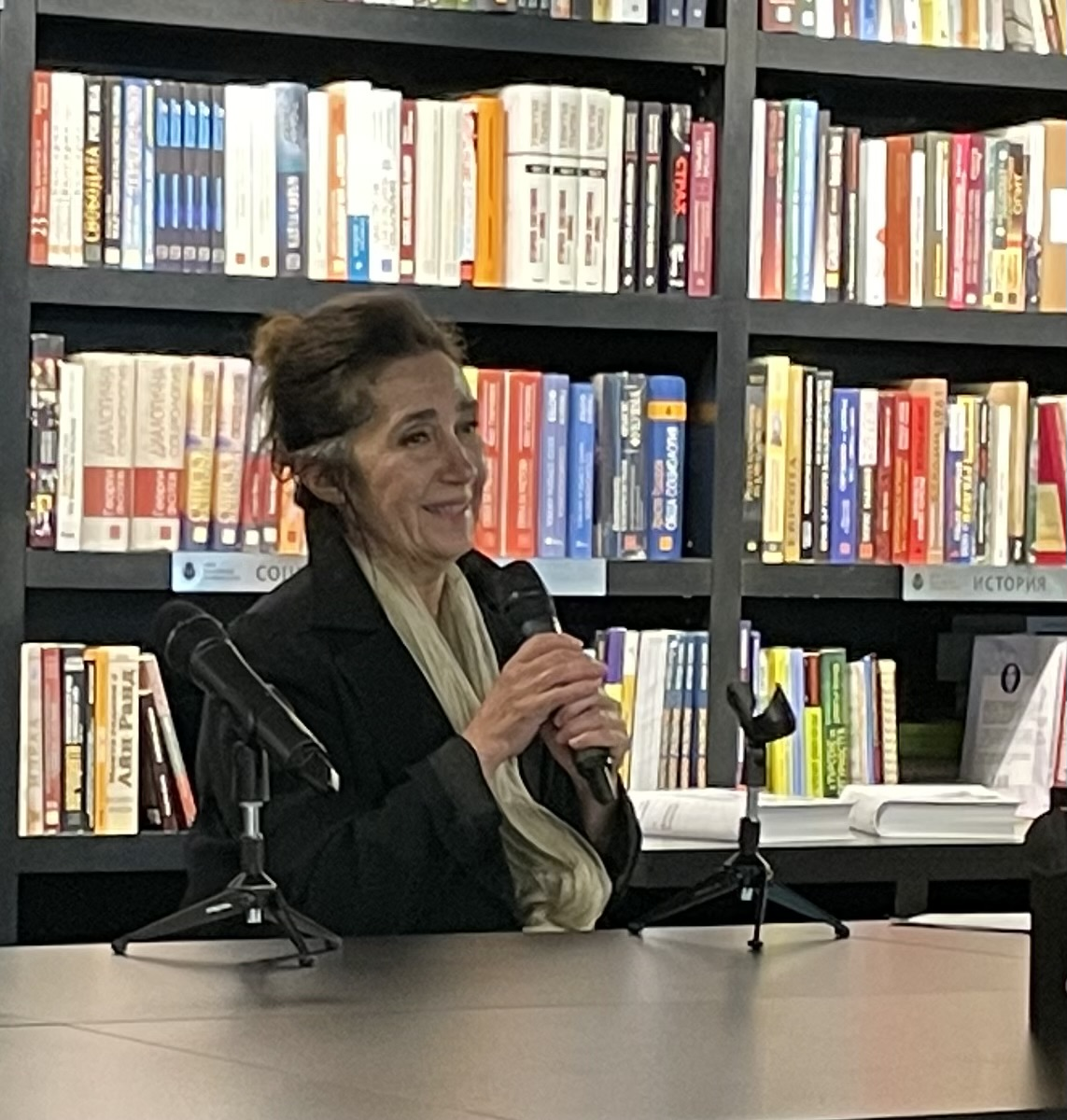

Albena Stambolova (Bulgarian: Албена Стамболова; born 1957) is a Bulgarian psychoanalyst and Freudian psychologist, literature columnist and novelist. She became known with her lectures on psychoanalysis that she gave to Bulgarian philology program and Slavic and Western philologies in Sofia University after her return from France where she studied to Bulgarian literary critic, semiotician and psychoanalyst Julia Kristeva.

She is also prominent with her article "Write(ing) about her (the economic crisis)" in Bulgarian newspaper Capital in 2012. The article denotes her talks on Kristeva psychoanalysis for which she was asked and further (the need) to talk about the World economic crisis of 2009–2011, need that she felt with her article and that also advice's (her students and follow ups) to talk(write) on economic crisis and economic crisis solving.

She also gained fame with her novel Everything Happens as it Does.

== Biography ==
Albena Stambolova is born in Sofia, Bulgaria, she studied French literature and language at Sofia University. Later she moved to France where living in Paris in the 1990s, she studied psychoanalysis to Bulgarian literary f?itic and semiotician Julia Kristeva, and she graduated in psychology at Paris Diderot University and taught at Dauphine University and at Sorbonne Nouvelle. She has in 2001 returned to Bulgaria where gave her prominent lectures in psychoanalysis, and started working also as a psychotherapist.

Her first novel after her return to Bulgaria was somehow warmly accepted by public and acclaimed by the critics, that is Stambolova 2002 novel Това е както става (translated as (Everything)It Happens as it Does) is a book on seven love stories showing how everything will turn out exactly as intended. The next novel she writes Хип-хоп звездите (Hip-Hop Stars, 2003), was followed by Авантюра, за да мине времето, (An Adventure to Spend Some Time, 2007). She has also published a collection of short stories and a psychoanalytical analysis and harsh criticism of Marguerite Duras: Боледуване в смъртта – психоаналитичен прочит на Маргарит Дюрас (1994). She made translations into English works by Tzvetan Todorov, Claude Lévi-Strauss and Julia Kristeva.

== Works ==
=== Prose ===
- 1995: Многоточия (Ellipses), lyrical prose
- 2002: Това е както става, novel, 2002, translated as Everything Happens as it Does (2013)
- 2003: Хоп-хоп звездите, (Hip-Hop Stars), novel
- 2007: Авантюра, за да мине времето, (Adventure to Pass the Time), novel

=== Monographs ===
- 1994: Боледуване в смъртта – психоаналитичен прочит на Маргарит Дюрас, (Illness in Death – a psychoanalytical analysis of Marguerite Duras)

=== Translations ===
- Tzvetan Todorov, The Poetry of Prose, National Culture, 1985
- Claude Lévi-Strauss, The Savage Mind, EA 2002
- Julia Kristeva, Murder in Byzantium, 2005
