= Gergina Dvoretzka =

Bulgarian journalist and poet

Gergina Dvoretzka (Bulgarian: Гергина Дворецка) is a Bulgarian journalist and poet.

== Life ==
Born in Sofia, Dvoretzka finished the French Language School in Sofia, and graduated in Bulgarian Philology from Sofia University. Dvoretzka was a journalist at the Bulgarian National Radio. As early as 1990, Dvoretzka started the first radioshow in Bulgaria dedicated to European integration. This show, called European Projects, was broadcast weekly on the airwaves of the Hristo Botev programme. Since 2014 Dvoretzka is the President of the "Europe and the World" Foundation.

Dvoretzka has published four books of poetry. At the end of 2009 she wrote a book of prose in Bulgarian and Polish, Славянско Танго/Slowianskie tango, which was published by Paper Tiger. In 2012 she published another novel, Otkrivaneto na Dagoberta ("The Discovery of Dagoberta"). Her new book of poems, Balada za Ptitsata Feniks ("Ballad of the Phoenix Bird") was published in 2014.

In February 2007, Dvoretzka received the French Ordre des Palmes académiques.
