= Alexander Spiridonov =

Russian politician

- Александр Спиридонов
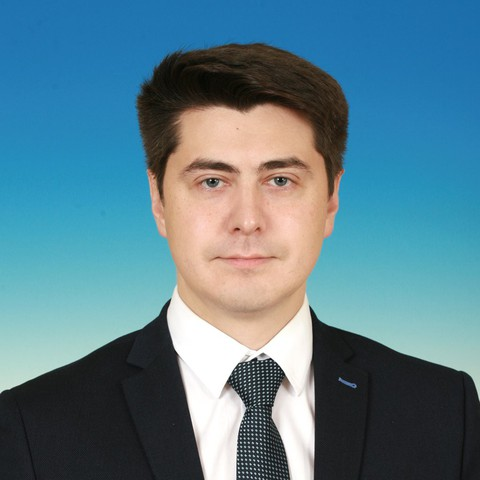

Member of the State Duma for Arkhangelsk Oblast
- Incumbent
- Assumed office 12 October 2021
- Preceded by: Dmitry Yurkov
- Constituency: Arkhangelsk (No. 72)

Personal details
- Born: 3 January 1989 (age 37) Severodvinsk, RSFSR, USSR
- Party: United Russia
- Education: Saint Petersburg State Marine Technical University

Alexander Yurievich Spiridonov (Russian: Александр Юрьевич Спиридонов; 3 January 1989, Severodvinsk) is a Russian politician who served as a deputy of the 8th State Duma.

While studying at the Saint Petersburg State Marine Technical University, Spiridonov started working at the Sevmash. In 2010, he was recognized as the best young worker at the enterprise. In 2019, Spiridonov won in The Leaders of Russia contest. He was engaged in various local social initiatives. Since September 2021, he has served as deputy of the 8th State Duma.
