= Sergei Shulgin (politician) =

Russian politician (1956–2021)

Member of the State Duma
- In office 11 January 1994 – 22 December 1995
- Constituency: Arkhangelsk

Personal details
- Born: 14 January 1956 Minusinsk, Krasnoyarsk Krai, Russian SFSR, Soviet Union
- Died: 11 November 2021 (aged 65) Moscow, Russia
- Party: PRES

Sergei Nikolayevich Shulgin (Russian: Сергей Николаевич Шульгин; 14 January 1956 – 11 November 2021) was a Russian politician. A member of the Party of Russian Unity and Accord, he served in the State Duma from 1994 to 1995.
