= Vladimir Krupchak =

Russian entrepreneur

Vladimir Yaroslavovich Krupchak
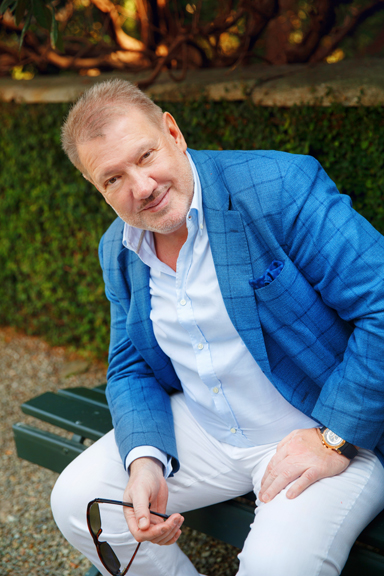
- Born: 29 January 1958 (age 68); Bykovo, Vilegodsky District, Arkhangelsk Oblast, RSFSR, Soviet Union
- Citizenship: Cyprus
- Education: Arkhangelsk State Medical Institute
- Children: 7

Vladimir Yaroslavovich Krupchak (Russian: Владимир Ярославович Крупчак) (born January 29, 1958) is a Russian entrepreneur and a former member of the State Duma (2004 to 2007).

== Biography ==
Born on January 29, 1958, in the village of Bykovo (Vilegodsky District, Arkhangelsk Region).

Graduated from the Arkhangelsk State Medical Institute in 1980 (Faculty of Dentistry).

From 1990 to 2000 - Director General of the commercial manufacturing enterprise OOO Titan. In 1994 he graduated from the School of Business of the University of Portland in USA.

From 1996 to 2004 - Chairman of the Board of Directors of OAO Arkhangelsk PPM, ZAO Sawmill 25 and President of the Titan Group. Also, from 1997 to 2000 - Director General of OOO Arkhbum. In 1998 he graduated from the All-Russian Distance Institute of Finance and Economics.

== Political activity ==
From 2004 to 2007 - Deputy of the State Duma of the Federal Assembly of the Russian Federation of the IV convocation, chairman of the Subcommittee on Forest Resources forming part of the Committee on Natural Resources and Environmental Management.

Since 2008, Krupchak has not been involved in political activities.

== Family ==
Married, 7 children.

== Scientific degrees ==
- June 13, 2000 - PhD in Economics.
- December 23, 2004 - Doctor of Economics.

== Awards ==
- Medal of the Order "For Merit to the Fatherland" II class (May 21, 1999) - for successful preparation and active participation in the XXI Bandy World Championship in the city of Arkhangelsk.
- Order of Merit III class (October 29, 2003, Ukraine) - for a significant personal contribution to the preservation of the national and cultural traditions of Ukrainians in Russia.
- Laureate of the Peter the Great national prize, nominated "Leader of Russian Business in Timber Industry-2002".
- Order of Benefit.
