= Ekaterina Karabasheva =

Bulgarian writer

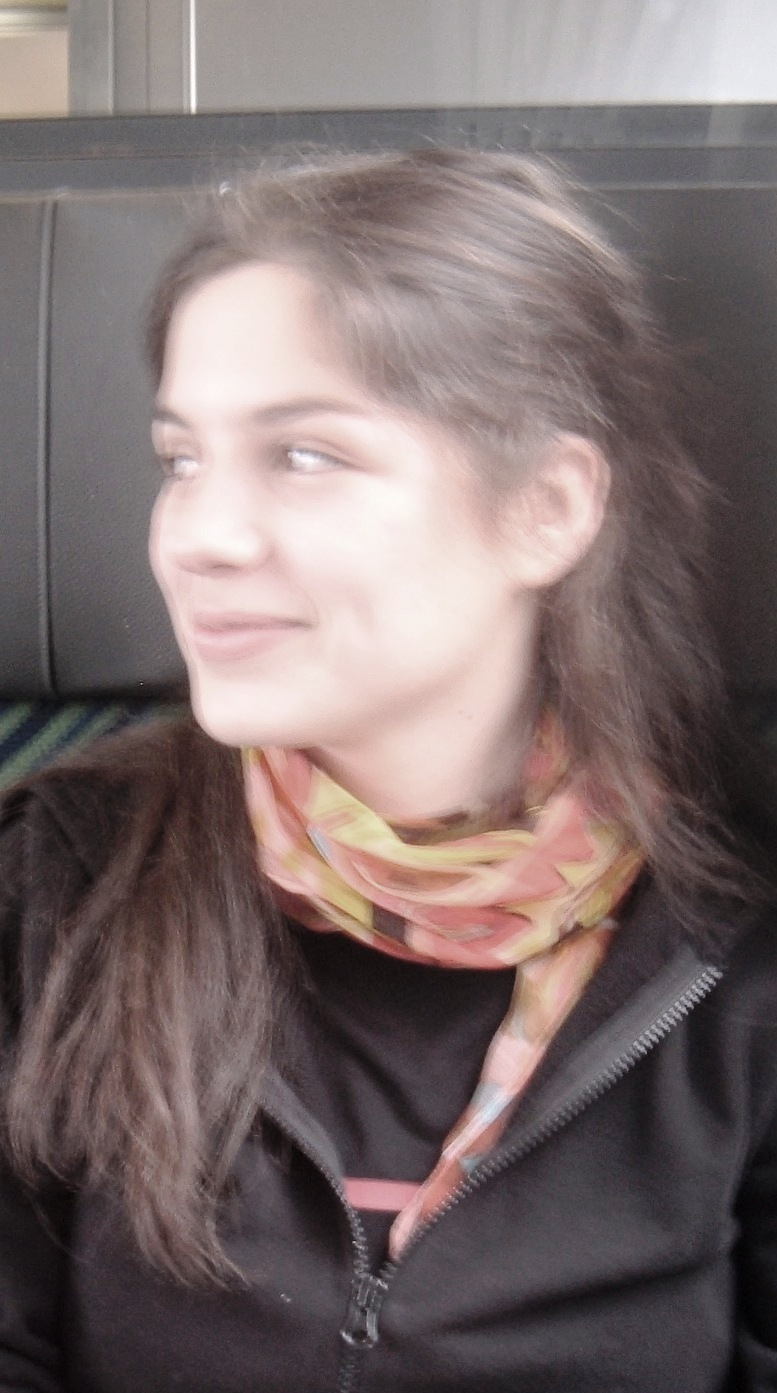
- Born: 19 August 1989 (age 36); Sofia, Bulgaria
- Occupation: Poet

Ekaterina Karabasheva (Bulgarian: Екатерина Карабашева) was born on 19 August 1989 in Sofia, Bulgaria. She is a prizewinner of Children competition “Space” 1999, International Children Haiku- competition – 2003, National children literature competition “Sparkles – 2004” and of Annual competition “Without Smoke” – 2004.

== Published works ==
She has published in numerous Bulgarian literature magazines, as well as in the Romanian literature magazine “Dunặrea de Jos”, in the German and English culture magazines “Paraguas”, “Junge Literatur” and “The MAG”..

"On the Edge of the Earth” is her first book, with which she won an award at the National annual Competition for Debut Literature “South Spring” 2005.

Her short stories and poems have been translated into English, German, Russian, Romanian, Italian and French.

== Honours and awards ==
In 2006 she was awarded the first prize at the National literature competitions “My new five poems”, “The Soul of the Spring” and “Dora Gabe”. She received awards in National competitions like “Petya Dubarova”, “My idea of Europe”, “Hristo Fotev”, “Veselin Hanchev” and at Britain's most prestigious poetry prize for young writers “The Foyle Young Poets of the Year Award”.

She was admitted to the English Poetry Society at a solemn ceremony at London’s Royal Shakespeare Theater. Ekaterina Karabasheva is the first Bulgarian to be awarded in the contest and to become member of the English Poetry Society.

In 2007 she received the first prize in the International contest for young writers “Literatur überwindet Grenzen” and in the "WordFlight Young People’s Written & Verbal Arts Project".
