= Aleksandra Monedzhikova =

Bulgarian geographer (1889–1959)

Aleksandra Mihailova Monedzhikova
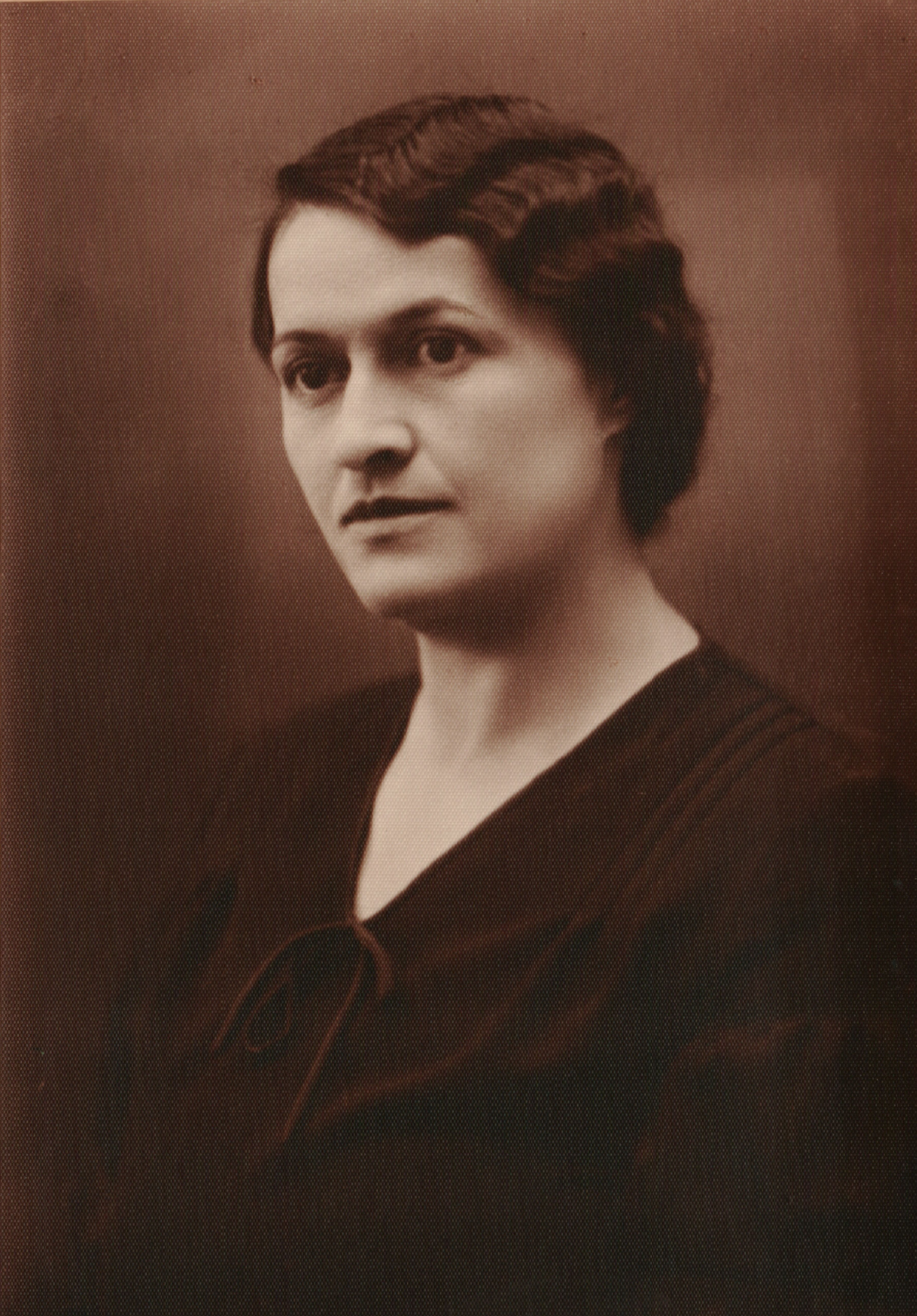
- Monedzhikova in 1932
- Born: Александра Монеджикова; 24 January 1889; Plovdiv, Bulgaria
- Died: 2 July 1959 (aged 70); Sofia, Bulgaria
- Education: Sofia University
- Occupations: Geographer, writer
- Known for: Sofia through the centuries (1946)
- Spouse: Naiden Nikolov
- Children: Milena (daughter)

Aleksandra Mihailova Monedzhikova (24 January 1889 – 2 July 1959) (also spelled Monedžikova or Monedjikova) was a Bulgarian geographer, historian, writer and teacher.

== Biography ==
Aleksandra Monedzhikova (in Bulgarian, Александра Монеджикова) was born 24 January 1889 in Plovdiv, Bulgaria; her parents were a judge and a teacher. Her grandmother and grandfather had been refugees from the region of Bansko, Bulgaria, who settled in Plovdiv after the brutal suppression of the Kresna-Razlog uprising of 1878.

In 1906 her parents moved to the country's capital city of Sofia to work. Monedzhikova graduated from the Second Sofia Girls' High School in 1907, after which she became a teacher in the village of Transka Klisura (Transka district, Western suburbs). There she married Naiden Nikolov, a teacher at the same school, and from that time she was sometimes known as Aleksandra Monedzhikova-Nikolova. During the academic year 1908-1909 she was also a student of history and geography at Sofia University, but "due to motherhood, wars, uprisings and other events," she didn't graduate until 1924 from the history and philology department.

During the First World War, Monedzhikova translated and published the book The Teacher of the Workers by Edmondo de Amichis. During the years between 1927 and 1930, she published books titled Romania, Yugoslavia, Albania, European Turkey, Greece, Macedonia and Dobrudja. In 1928, the Polish Mutual Aid Society in Bulgaria published her book about Poland.

=== Teacher ===
After graduating from the university, she worked for seven years until 1931, as a teacher of geography, history and Bulgarian language at the French College in Sofia. During the academic year 1931-1932 she taught at the Third Sofia Boys' High School, and in 1932–1933 she was a teacher at the First Sofia Boys' High School. She also worked for three years at the private "St. Maria" German school in Sofia.

=== Writer ===
Monedzhikova left teaching to devote herself to active journalistic, social, scientific and promotional activities with the goal of spreading science among the masses. To do so, she engaged in lectures, talks and fairy tales, and often accompanied them with additional activities such as screenings and research presentations. She also co-authored, geography textbooks for schools, articles in newspapers and magazines, and editorial work. She gave several geographical lectures at the Thessaloniki cinema, in Greece.

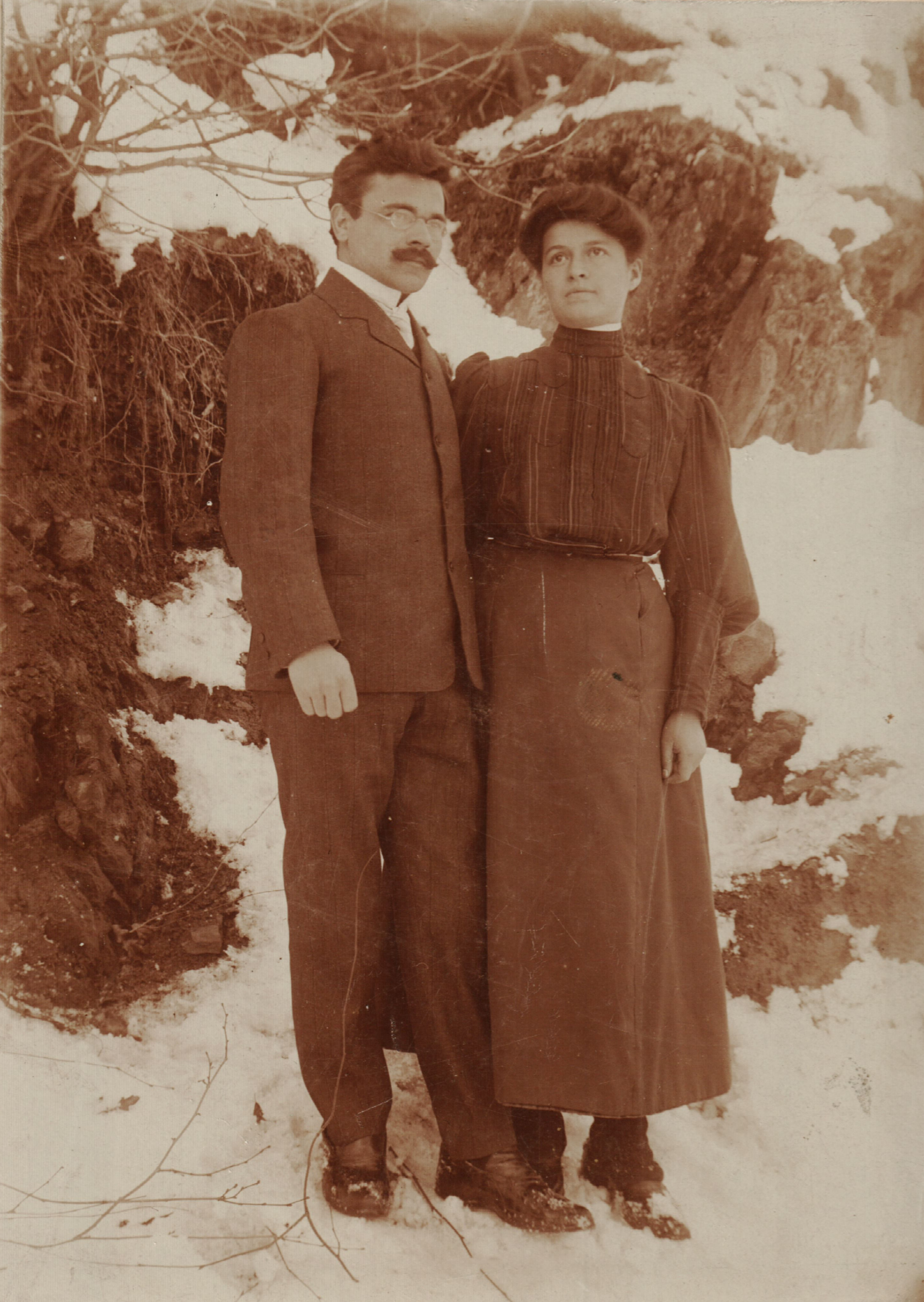
Bulgarian geographer Aleksandra Monedzhikova with her husband Nayden Nikolov in 1908.

She also worked at the Union of French Alumni in Sofia, giving a number of lectures, accompanied by screenings in the capital and in the country about Paris, the French Revolutions, the Museums of Paris and other topics of interest. She was also chosen as the cultural leader of her visit to the World's Fair in Paris in 1937, and the following year, she published her book Paris through the Centuries (1938).

She published a wide variety of original, popular science and translated articles in the newspapers Zarya, Mir, Anvil, etc. She also collaborated with the magazines Bulgarian Tourist, Youth Tourist, Our Village and Fight against Alcoholism.

At the same time, Monedzhikova was an active member of the management of the Bulgarian Geographical Society (BGD), and starting on 9 September 1944, she served as its chairman until 1948. Until the end of her life she remained an honorary member of the BGD as well as the All-Union Geographical Society in Leningrad.

=== Published author ===
Monedzhikova was the author and co-author of textbooks on the geography of Bulgaria and historical-geographical essays, including the Geography of Bulgaria (1941) and Geography of Bulgaria in its present borders (co-authored, 1942). For seven years she was the only editor of the newspaper Trezvache.

Her most significant work is considered the book Sofia through the centuries, published in 1946, which recreates the life of the capital from its ancient inception as a settlement through 1944. The book is richly illustrated and was awarded a prize by the Bulgarian Academy of Sciences and the Sofia Municipality.

While Monedzhikova was in Moscow, 1947–1950, she sent articles to a number of newspapers and magazines such as "Geographical Review." In 1949 several of her books were published including The Moscow Kremlin, Leningrad, Journey through the Caucasus.

=== Archivist ===
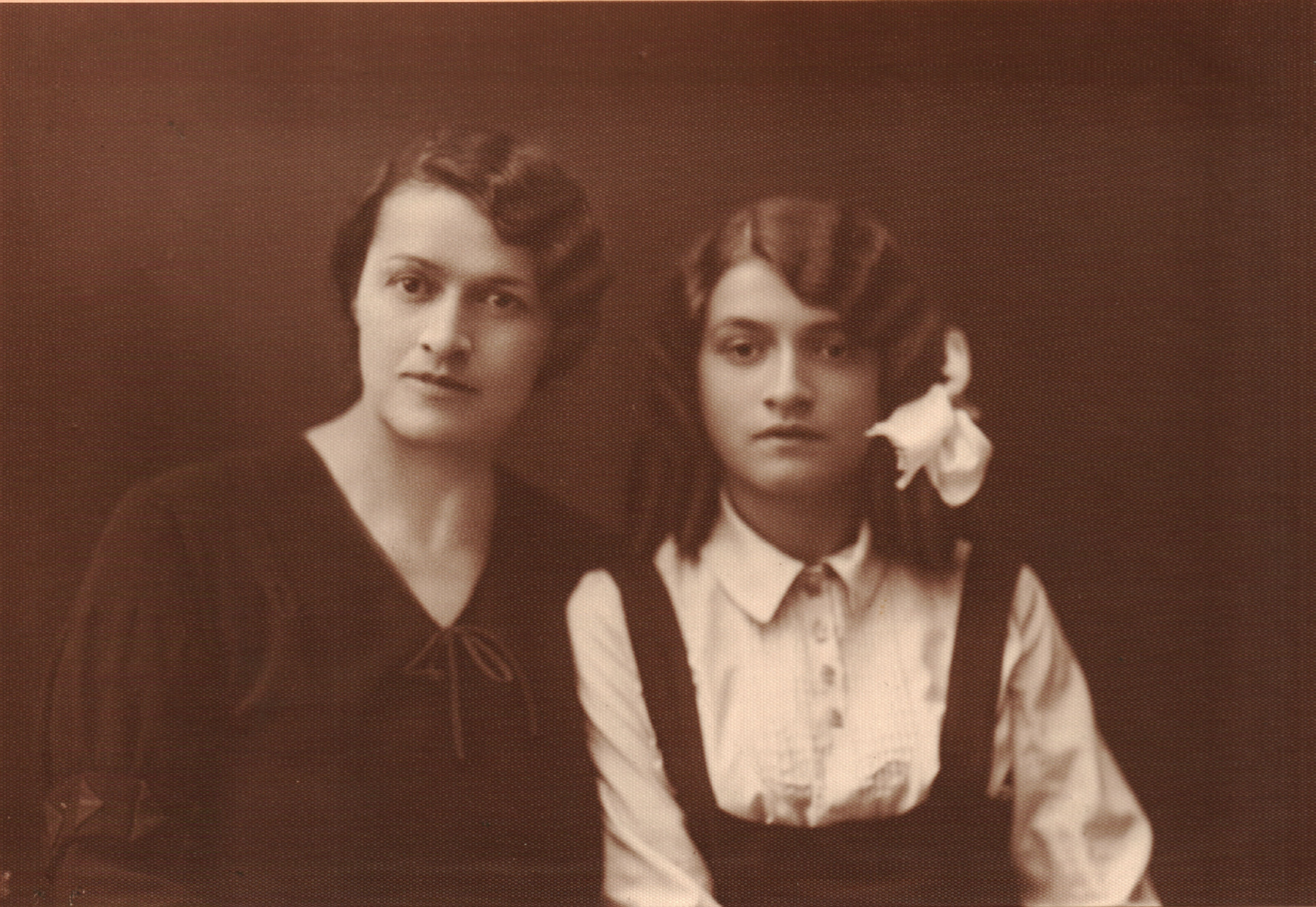
Aleksandra Monedzhikova with her daughter Milena in 1932.

From 1950 to 1953 she lived and worked in London, where her husband, Naiden Nikolov, served as Bulgarian ambassador to Britain. While she lived there, she carried out research at the British Museum and in the diplomatic archives of the British Foreign Office. There, she searched for, printed and hand-wrote diplomatic materials related to Bulgarian history in the 19th century. She passed the many materials she collected from these archives to the Institute of Bulgarian History at the Bulgarian Academy of Sciences in 1953. Based on some of them, she wrote a number of articles, such as: "Documents on the Kresna Uprising, Reflection of the April Uprising in England, France and Italy," and "On the issue of national liberation movements in Bulgaria from 1863 to 1869."

Her personal archive from her research is stored in "fund 1064K" (in Bulgarian) in the Central State Archive consisting of 69 archival items including documents and photographs dating from 1861 to 1956.

=== Death ===
Monedzhikova died on 2 July 1959, in Sofia.

== Memberships ==
She was an honorary member of the Bulgarian Geographical Society, the All-Union Geographical Society/Leningrad, and a part-time associate at the Botev-Levski Institute at the Bulgarian Academy of Sciences.

== Selected publications ==
According to WorldCat.org, as of 2020, ten works by Monedzhikova's work can be found in 12 publications in the Bulgarian language and 13 library holdings.

- Monedjikova, Alexandra. Polša. Sofiâ: Pol. G-vo za Vzaimna Pomoŝ v B"lgariâ, 1928. (in Bulgarian)
- Monedjikova, Alexandra. Dobrudža. Sofiâ: Hemus, 1928. (in Bulgarian)
- Monedjikova, Alexandra. Makedoniâ. Sofiâ: Hemus, 1929. (in Bulgarian)
- Monedjikova, A, and St Petrov. Geografija Na Bălgarija V Dnešnitě: I Granici S Mnogo Četiva; Pomagalo Za Učenici Ot Gimnaziitě I Za Samoobrazovanie. Sofija: Fakel, 1942. (in Bulgarian)
- Monedjikova, A. Sofija Prez Vekovete (Sofia through the centuries). Sofija: Fakel, 1946. (in Bulgarian)
- Monedjikova, A. Leningrad. Sofija: Dăržavno Izdat. "Narodna Prosveta," 1949. (in Bulgarian)
- Monedjikova, A. Pŭtuvane Iz Kavkaz. Sofija: Dăržavno Izdat. "Nauka i izkustvo," 1949. (in Bulgarian)
