= Tea Sugareva =

Bulgarian poet (born 1989)

Associate professor Dr. Teya Edvinova Sugareva (born December 5, 1989, Sofia, Bulgaria) is a Bulgarian theatre director, drama teacher, and poet.

== Education ==
- 2014 – 2017: PhD student at the Department of Acting and Directing for Drama Theatre at the National Academy of Theatre and Film Arts. Dissertation topic: "Directing practice in Bulgaria in the 1980s and 1990s - between the dramaturgy of the absurd and the aesthetics of modernism."
- 2012 – 2013: Theatre Art master’s program at the National Academy of Theatre and Film Arts "Krustyo Sarafov". Graduated with a master's thesis on "Aspects of the collaboration between the director and the playwright in contemporary Bulgarian Theatre"
- 2008 – 2012: Studied Directing for Drama Theatre at the National Academy of Theatre and Film Arts "Krustyo Sarafov" in the class of Prof. Snezhina Tankovska. Graduated with a graduation performance of "Dead Souls" by Mikhail Bulgakov after N.V. Gogol.
- 2003 – 2008: studied at the National High School of Ancient Languages and Cultures, Konstantin Cyril Philosopher, Humanities profile. Graduated with a thesis on "Poetics of fairytale in Alexander Vutimsky's prose".

== Participation in international projects ==
- 2009 "Teacher's Academy", organized by the European League of Institutes of the Arts (ELIA) - coordinator of student groups
- 2010 The first meeting of GATS (Global Alliance of the Theatre Schools) - coordinator of student groups
- 2014 Drama League Directors Project - Drama League Fellow

== Participation in workshops ==
- 2009 The Body Tells the Story - Amanda Brennan
- 2009 Like a Puppet on a String - Francesca Trevzer and May Fryuh
- 2009 Street Theatre - a Case Study - Ger Clancy and Monica Binek
- 2010 Dialogues with Your Voice - Kristin Linklater
- 2011 Movement Elements of Classical Chinese Beijing Opera - Jian Xu
- 2012 From Page to Stage – Roger Danforth and Lydia Starck
- 2013 Viewpoints – Barbara Lanciers, Juanita Rockwell, Gabriel Shanks
- 2014 Physical Theatre and Clown Acting – Steve Pacek
- 2014 Acting the Song – Zi Alikhan
- 2014 Vocal Viewpoints - Jen Waldman

== Professional performances ==
- December 2023: WHAT IS VIRGINIA WOOLF AFRAID OF?, original work produced by "Enso" company and I AM studio
- September 2022: THE BOY IN THE LAST RAW by Juan Mayorga, production of Theatre "Nikola Vaptsarov", Blagoevgrad, Bulgaria
- October 2020: AT SPEED after Harold Pinter, production of “Multicult” company and National Palace of Culture, Sofia, Bulgaria
- February 2020: THE PRIVATE EAR by Peter Shafer and BULL by Mike Bartlett, production of Theatre "Sofia", Sofia, Bulgaria
- October 2019: VAPTSAROV: SONGS FOR THE MAN, production of Theatre "Nikola Vaptsarov", Blagoevgrad, Bulgaria
- November 2017: LEVEL 506 by Yassen Vasilvev, Radio play at the Bulgarian National Radio, Sofia, Bulgaria
- October 2017: I'M GOING TO TELL YOU A STORY, production of the “In Pulse” company at the Red House Center for Culture and Debate, Sofia, Bulgaria
- March 2017: THE STORM by Kiril Buhovski, Radio play at the Bulgarian National Radio, Sofia, Bulgaria
- November 2016: PROBATION PERIOD by Nikolay Gunderov, production of Theatre 199 "Valentin Stoychev", Sofia, Bulgaria
- June 2016: THE ETERNAL RETURN from Ivan Dimitrov, Radio play at the Bulgarian National Radio, Sofia, Bulgaria
- March 2015: TWELFTH NIGHT by William Shakespeare, production of Small Town Theatre Behind the Channel, Sofia, Bulgaria
- February 2015: GASTARBEITER by Rainer Fasbinder, Training theatre, National Academy of Theatre and Film Arts, Sofia, Bulgaria
- July 2014: THE LITTLE PRINCE (after Antoine de Saint-Exupery), produced by The Hangar Theatre, Ithaca, United States
- June 2014: THIS PROPERTY IS CONDEMNED by Tennessee Williams, produced by The Hangar Theatre, Ithaca, United States
- March 2014: INVITATION FOR DINNER by Olya Stoyanova, production of Theatre Sofia, Sofia, Bulgaria
- September 2013: ROBIN by Anna Topaldzhikova, production of the "Antrakt" Association and the Vazrajdane Theatre, Sofia, Bulgaria
- June 2013: WELCOME, AMERICA! by Matthew Vishniek, production of Theatre Sofia, Sofia
- December 2012: DEAD SOULS by M. Bulgakov, by N.V. Gogol, production of Satirical Thearte “Aleko Konstantinov”, Sofia, Bulgaria
- October 2012: WALLED IN ONES by Yassen Vassilev, production of Youth Theatre "Nikolay Binev", Sofia, Bulgaria
- September 2012: THE MISER by Moliere, Theatre "Nevena Kokanova" in Yambol, Bulgaria

== Teaching experience ==
- September 2017 - senior assistant professor at National Academy for Theatre and Film Arts
- September 2012 – until now, assistant of Prof. Tankovska; leads classes in "Directing for Drama Theatre" and "Acting for Drama Theatre" at The National Academy for Theatre and Film Arts
- March 2014 – co-leader of Stanislavski's System - Actors Training workshop at The National Academy for students from Toho, Japan
- July 2014 – leader of Actors Training in European Theatre workshop at The Hangar Theatre in Ithaca, NY, USA

== Research activity ==
- January 2014 is a PhD candidate in the Department "Acting and Directing for Drama Theatre" at the National Academy for Theatre and Film Arts

== Participated in the following festivals ==
- July 2011 GATS Theatre Festival in Beijing, China as director of "Fire Dragon" after Geo Milev, Ivan Radoev, Alexander Vutimski
- June 2012 International Theatre Festival "Varna Summer" in Varna, Bulgaria as a director of "Dead Souls" by Bulgakov after Gogol
- June 2013 International Theatre Festival "Varna Summer" in Varna, Bulgaria as a director of "Welkome America" by Matthew Vishniek
- June 2013 Theatrical Holidays "Nevena Kokanova" in Yambol, Bulgaria as a director of "The Miser" by Molière
- October 2013 Days of Young Theater in Lovech, Bulgaria as a director of “Walled in Ones" by Yassen Vassilev

== Awards and honors ==
- 2012 National Academy award “Most Most Most” in the category “Best Director for Drama Theatre" in the class of 2012
- 2013 "Golden Kukerikon" - Award in the category "Young Force" for the direction of "Dead Souls" by M. Bulgakov after Gogol
- 2014 “Icarus” – award in the category “Debut” for the direction of "Robin" by Anna Topaldjikova
- 2014 “Ascer” nomination in the category “Directing” for the direction of “Invitation for Dinner” by Olya Stoyanova
- 2014: Certificate of Excellence from the Ministry of Culture

=== Poetry awards ===
- 2005 to present - author of poetry, published in specialized magazines for poetry, award winner of national literary competitions:
- 2007, 2008 "Petya Dubarova" in Burgas, Bulgaria
- 2007 “Vazkresenie" (Resurrection) in Dobrich, Bulgaria
- 2007 "Dushata na edin izvor" (The Soul of a Source) in Yambol, Bulgaria
