= Saint Petersburg State Marine Technical University =

Public university in Saint Petersburg, Russia

- Санкт-Петербургский государственный морской технический университет
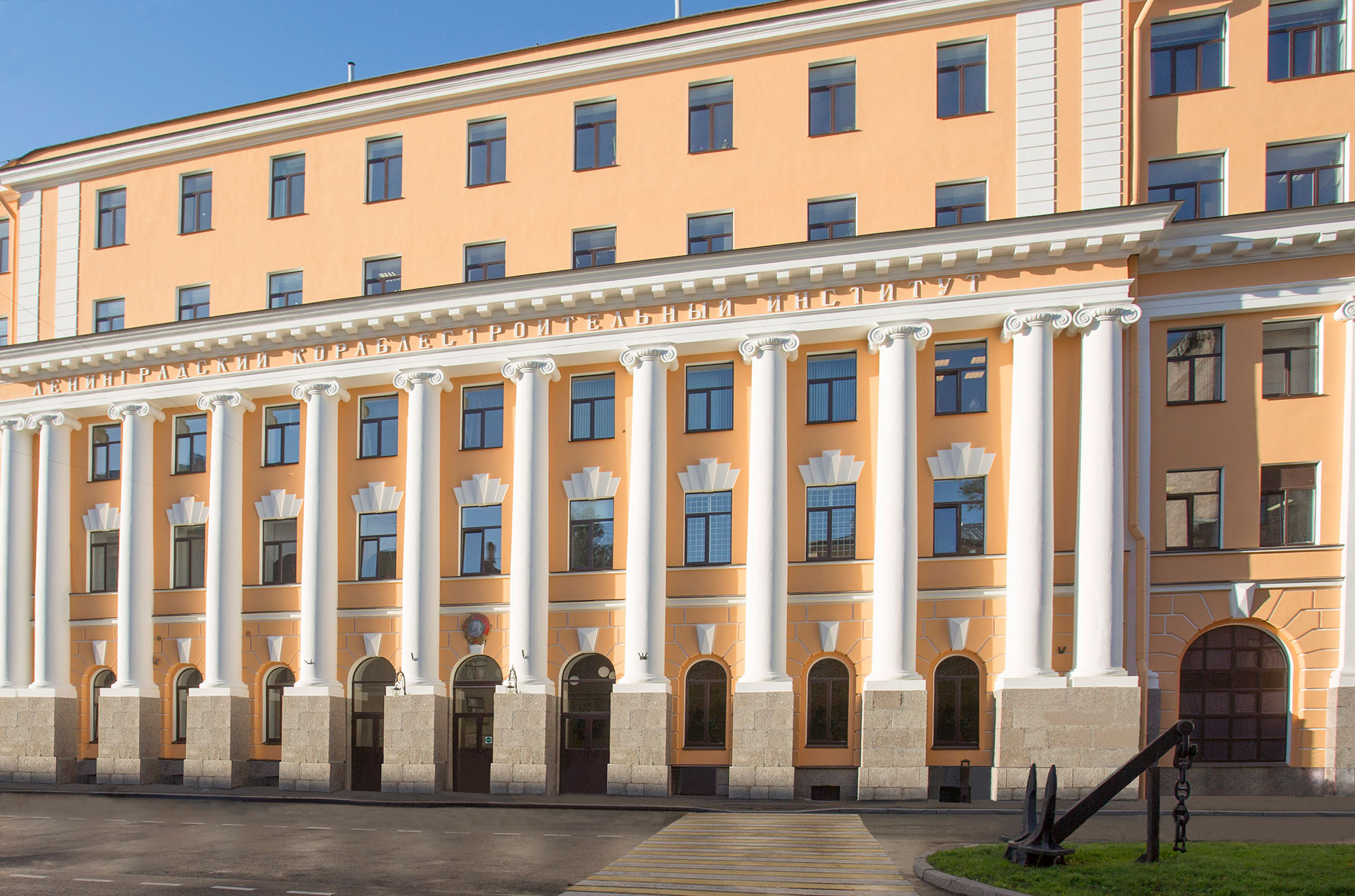
- Type: public
- Established: 1930
- Location: 3 Lotsmanskaya str., Saint Petersburg, Russia; 59°55′06″N 30°16′35″E
- Campus: urban
- Language: Russian
- Website: www.smtu.ru

Saint Petersburg State Marine Technical University (Russian: Санкт-Петербургский государственный морской технический университет) is a public university located in Saint Petersburg, Russia. It was founded in 1930.

== History ==
The Leningrad Shipbuilding Institute (LKI) was created in 1930 by introducing a shipbuilding department from the Leningrad Polytechnic Institute. The new institute had about 200 students after its formation. Gradually the number of students at the institute increased to 1,000 students.

In 1931 an evening department was created at the institute. In 1939 the Faculty of Engineering and Economics was created. In 1940, under the Department of Ship Theory was created experimental pool LKI.

During World War II, 450 students went off to war. During the blockade of Leningrad the institute stopped its activity, part of the faculty and students were evacuated to Przhevalsk, Kirgiz SSR. Training for shipbuilding continued in Przhevalsk, where students and lecturers of LKI joined the Nikolayev Shipbuilding Institute, which was also evacuated.

In 1945 the institute returned to Leningrad. In 1957 the student's design office (now the Ocean Design Bureau) was established as part of the student's scientific society.

In 1962 the correspondence faculty was created. In 1965 the institute's branch in Severodvinsk was opened. In 1978 general engineering faculty was organized.

In 1990 Leningrad Shipbuilding Institute was one of the first in the USSR to receive the status of a technical university and was called Leningrad State Marine Technical University. In 1992, in connection with the return of the name St. Petersburg to Leningrad, Leningrad State Naval Technical University was renamed St. Petersburg State Naval Technical University.

As of the beginning of the 2020s the university prepares engineers-specialists in the range of shipbuilding specialties. Its main areas of focus are the design, construction and technical operation of seagoing ships, surface ships and submarines, as well as technical facilities for exploration and production of oil, gas and other minerals on the seabed.

== Structure ==
- Faculty of Shipbuilding and Ocean Engineering
- Faculty of Ship Power Engineering and Automatics
- Facultyt of Marine Instrumentation
- Faculty of Digital Industrial Technologies
- Faculty of Economics
- Faculty of Natural Sciences and Humanities
- Military Training Center
- Faculty of vocational guidance and pre-university training (replaced by services)
- Secondary technical Faculty (the country's first shipbuilding college)
- Evening and Distance Faculty
- Faculty for Targeted Contractual Training and Additional Professional Education
