= Novodvinsk =

Town in Arkhangelsk Oblast, Russia

Novodvinsk Новодвинск
- Town
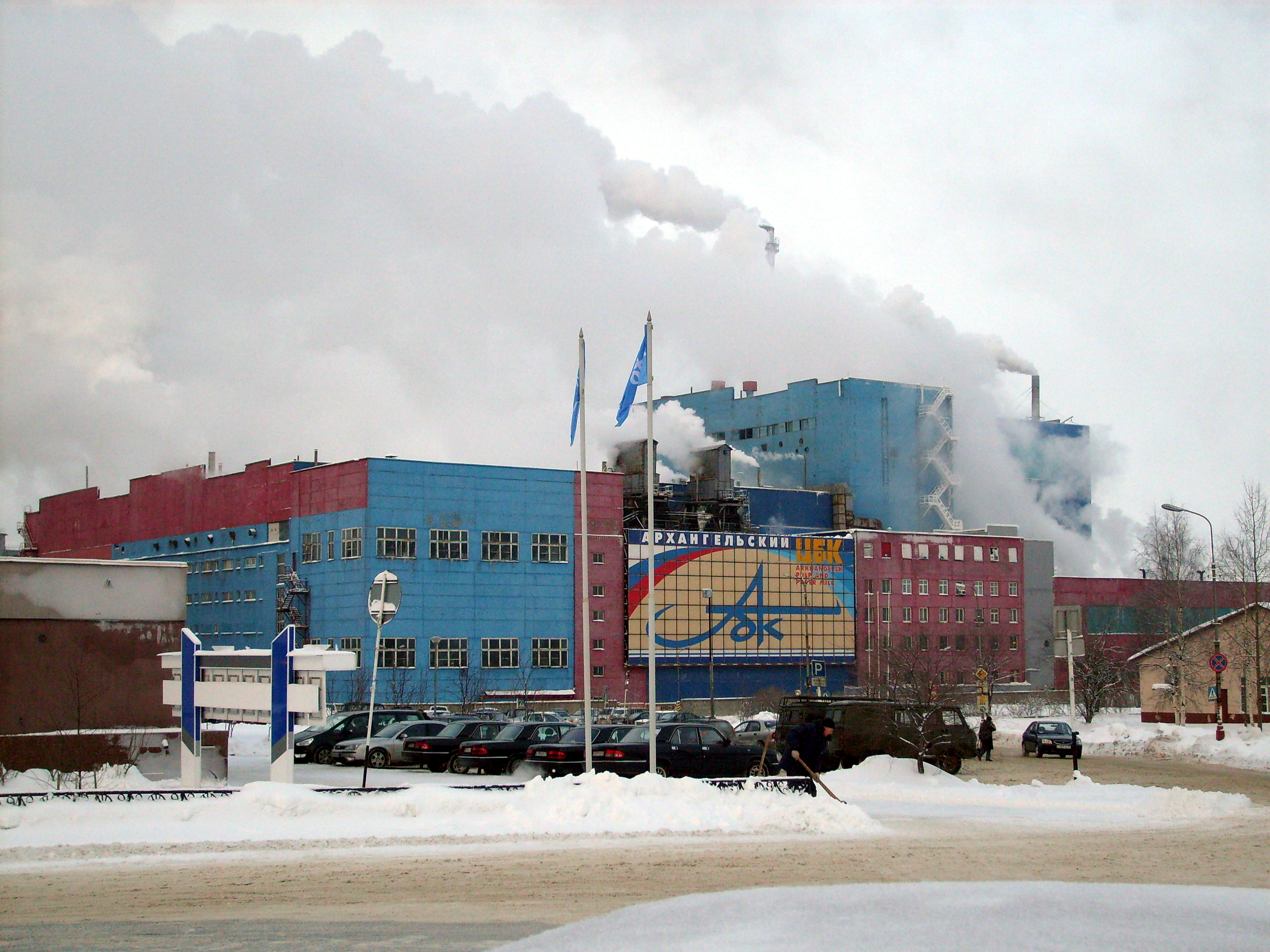
- Arkhangelsk Pulp and Paper Mill

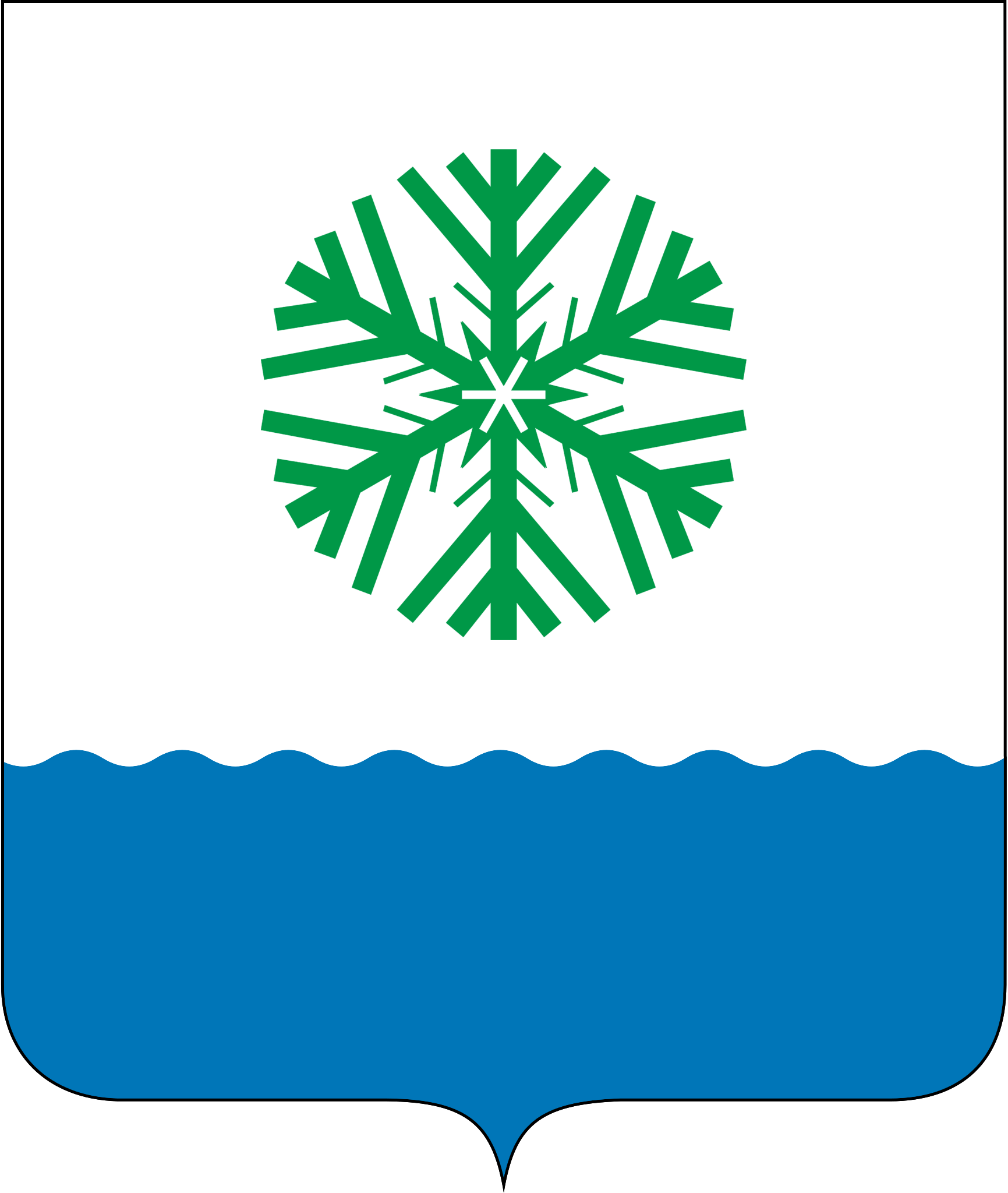
- Flag Coat of arms
- Interactive map of Novodvinsk
- Location of Novodvinsk Novodvinsk (Arkhangelsk Oblast)
- Coordinates: 64°25′N 40°50′E
- Country: Russia
- Federal subject: Arkhangelsk Oblast
- Founded: 1935
- Town status since: 1977

Government
  - Body: Council of City's Deputies
- Elevation: 20 m (66 ft)

Population (2010 Census)
  - Total: 40,615
  - Estimate (2025): 32,366 (−20.3%)

Administrative status
  - Subordinated to: town of oblast significance of Novodvinsk
  - Capital of: town of oblast significance of Novodvinsk

Municipal status
  - Urban okrug: Novodvinsk Urban Okrug
  - Capital of: Novodvinsk Urban Okrug
- Time zone: UTC+3 (MSK)
- Postal codes: 164900, 164901, 164902, 164903
- Dialing code: +7 81852
- OKTMO ID: 11715000001
- Website: www.novadmin.ru

Novodvinsk (Russian: Новодви́нск) is a town in the north of Arkhangelsk Oblast, Russia, located on the left bank of the Northern Dvina, 20 kilometers (12 mi) south of Arkhangelsk. Population: 40,615 (2010 census); 43,383 (2002 census); 50,183 (1989 Soviet census).

== History ==
It was founded in 1935 as the settlement of Voroshilovsky (Вороши́ловский) serving a pulp and paper mill. It was granted urban-type settlement status in 1941, renamed Pervomaysky in 1958, and was granted town status in 1977, at which time it also got its present name. Simultaneously, Novodvinsk was removed from Primorsky District of Arkhangelsk Oblast and became the town of oblast significance.

== Administrative and municipal status ==
Within the framework of administrative divisions, it is, together with one rural locality, incorporated as the town of oblast significance of Novodvinsk—an administrative unit with the status equal to that of the districts. As a municipal division, the town of oblast significance of Novodvinsk is incorporated as Novodvinsk Urban Okrug.

== Economy ==
=== Industry ===
The economy of Novodvinsk is based on the timber industry. The main employer in the town is Arkhangelsk Pulp and Paper Mill (Russian: Архангельский ЦБК). Additionally, there are a concrete construction plant and a plywood factory (which also produces furniture).

=== Transportation ===
The Northern Dvina is navigable in Novodvinsk, and there is some passenger navigation. There is also bus passenger service to Arkhangelsk. There is no passenger rail service.

== Education ==
Novodvinsk has 14 kindergartens, 7 high schools, Novodvinsk Industrial College, and two higher education schools associated with Saint-Petersburg Academy of Management and Economics, and with Arkhangelsk Technical University.

== Notable people ==
- Sergei Bykov (born 1983), Russian professional basketball player
- Leonid Yekimov (born 1987), Russian sport shooter
