= Julia Spiridonova – Yulka =

Bulgarian novelist and screenwriter (born 1972)

Julia Spiridonova
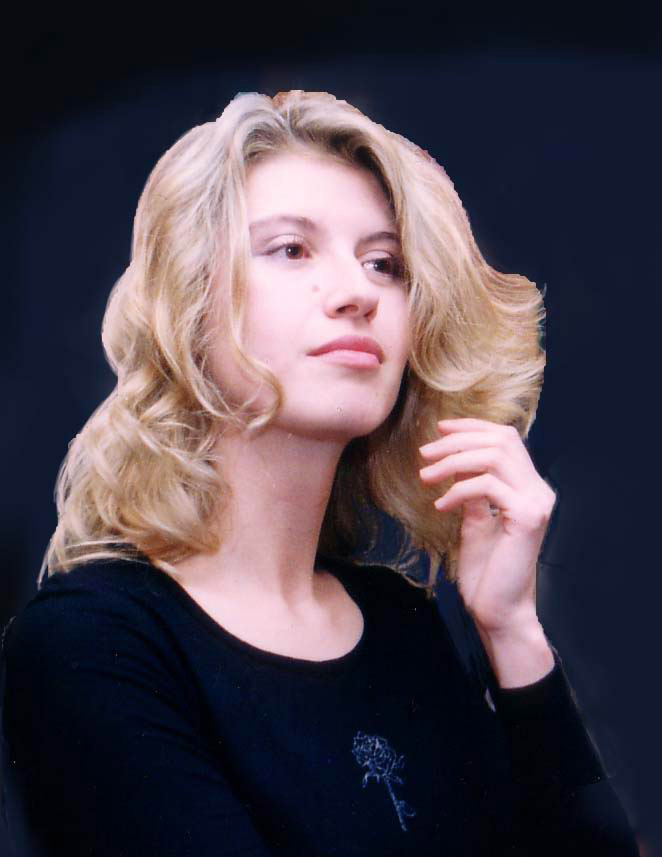
- Born: October 30, 1972; Sofia, Bulgaria
- Occupations: Author, screenwriter

Julia Spiridonova (Yulka) (Bulgarian: Юлия Спиридонова (Юлка); born October 30, 1972) is a Bulgarian novelist and a screenwriter. She was born in Sofia into a family of artists. She is the first Bulgarian nominated for the world's highest price for children’s literature, the Astrid Lindgren Memorial Award. Research by the I Read Foundation in 27 public libraries in Bulgaria showed that Spiridonova’s books are the most often asked-for and borrowed books. Spiridonova also works as a screenwriter. She is the creator and author of several TV shows and series for children and teenagers. Since 2021 she has lived in the United Kingdom.

== Books ==
- Baptiste, a Fantasy detective: Where is the baby (Fiut Publishing, 2026)
- A Girl or A Bird (Marmot Books, 2025)
- Димка, или Морская свинка (Мелик-Пашаев, 2025)
- Baptiste, a Fantasy detective: Goes to Downearth (Fiut Publishing, 2024)
- A Boy or a Guinea Pig (Marmot Books, 2023)
- The Scissors (Ciela Books, 2022) with Damyan Damyanov
- Sois Mon Ami (Elitchka, 2022)
- The Cricket's Shadow (Kragozor, 2022)
- Jigo's Adventures (Fiut Publishing, 2022)
- Voyage dans la Terre d'en Bas. Les Aventures de Baptiste, détective privé (Elitchka, 2022)
- GooGoo Birdies' Fairtails (Softpres, 2001)
- Kronos, toj nesrectnik! (Blesok, 2020)
- Kronos, acest nefericit! (Editura Aramis, 2019)
- Santa's secret agents (Kragozor, 2018)
- Milyen varázslatot rejt a hó? (Terézvárosi Bolgár Önkormányzat, 2017)
- Sun, Where Are You (Kragozor, 2017)
- Kronos, what a loser (Kragozor, 2016)
- What Sorcery Had Snow (Kragozor, 2015)
- Be My Friend (Kragozor, 2015)
- A Tale of the Magic Flute (Enthusiast, 2013)
- The Labakan's needle (Kragozor, 2013)
- Max (Kragozor, 2012)
- Blood of Kings (Kragozor, 2011)
- The Countess Bathory (Kragozor, 2010)
- My Sweet Pathwalker (Kragozor, 2009)
- Krustyo - the Private Eye's Adventures in the Downworld (Fiut Publishing, 2009)
- Big Deal Tina (Kragozor, 2008)
- Adventures with Djigo (Fiut Publishing, 2003)
- GooGoo Birdie's Stories (Damyan Yakov, 2000)
- The GooGoo Birdies (Interpress, 1999)

== Awards ==
- 2025 - The Astrid Lindgren Memorial Award (ALMA) Nominee
- 2024 - The annual Quill Award winner
- 2023 - PEP Lor’Est, France
- 2023 - The annual Hristo G. Danov Award winner
- 2023 - The Astrid Lindgren Memorial Award (ALMA) Nominee
- 2022 - The Astrid Lindgren Memorial Award (ALMA) Nominee
- 2021 - The Astrid Lindgren Memorial Award (ALMA) Nominee
- 2020 - The Astrid Lindgren Memorial Award (ALMA) Nominee
- 2019 - The Astrid Lindgren Memorial Award (ALMA) Nominee
- 2018 - The Astrid Lindgren Memorial Award (ALMA) Nominee
- 2017 - The Astrid Lindgren Memorial Award (ALMA) Nominee
- 2016 - The Magic Pearl National Children's Choice Award
- 2015 - The annual Quill Award winner, Children's Book of the Year category
- 2015 – The annual Hristo G. Danov Award nominee
- 2012 – The Child Honorary Diploma for lifetime contribution to the happy childhood of Bulgarian children
- 2012 - The annual Golden Apple Award nominee
- 2011 – The annual Hristo G. Danov Award nominee
- 2010 – The P.R. Slaveykov - Contribution to the Bulgarian Literature Award winner
- 2010 – The annual Konstantin Konstantinov Award winner, Author of the Year category
- 2010 – The annual Hristo G. Danov Award nominee
- 2006 - Children's book manuscript competition, held by the Bulgarian Writers Association for the My Sweet Pathwalker novel
- 2005 - Europe in a Fairytale competition third prize winner
- 1995 – The annual UNESCO award for The Pacifier short story

== Charity ==
From 2009 to the present Spiridonova has been the founder and organizer of the weekly Who Loves Fairytales initiative at the Children and Youth Department of the Sofia Capital Library.

From 2010 to the present she has been the founder and organizer of the Where Children Live, There Should Be Children's Books campaign. The campaign aims to set up libraries of newly published books for orphanages.

From 2015 to the present she has been the founder and organizer of the Flying Pig literary teen club initiative at the Children and Youth Department of the Sofia Capital Library.

== See also ==
- Petko Slaveykov
- Hristo G. Danov
