= Bahrain Confidential =

- Categories: Fashion magazine Lifestyle magazine
- Frequency: Monthly
- Publisher: Arabian Magazines
- Founded: 2001; 25 years ago
- Country: Bahrain
- Based in: Manama
- Language: English

Bahrain Confidential is an English language monthly lifestyle and luxury magazine published from Manama, Bahrain, by Arabian Magazines, a division of CG Arabia SPC. The magazine is based in Manama, the capital of Bahrain.

== History and profile ==
Launched in 2001, Bahrain Confidential is a luxury lifestyle magazine. It covers lifestyle, luxury, fashion and dining, as well as local events, art, society, fashion, beauty and travel.
