= 24 Chasa =

Periodical literature

- Type: Daily newspaper
- Format: Tabloid
- Owner(s): Media Group Bulgaria
- Editor: Borislav Zumbulev
- Founded: 1 April 1991; 34 years ago
- Language: Bulgarian
- Headquarters: Sofia
- City: Sofia
- Country: Bulgaria
- Circulation: 50 000 (daily)
- Website: www.24chasa.bg

24 Chasa (Bulgarian: 24 часа, lit. '24 hours') is a Bulgarian daily newspaper. Its headquarters are located in Sofia.

== History and profile ==
The newspaper, part of the 168 Chasa (meaning 168 Hours in English) Press Group founded by Petyo Blaskov, was launched in April 1991, a few months after the launch of the 168 Hours weekly newspaper.

The tabloid format and the colloquial, somewhat derisive, writing style of 24 Chasa quickly gained wide popularity.

One of the most popular features in the newspaper is the daily cartoon Ivancho i Mariyka, drawn by the well-known Bulgarian cartoonist Ivaylo Ninov, which also exists in animation version.

The newspaper was a part of the German WAZ media group until 2010 when it was acquired by the Media Group Bulgaria, LLC.

Its current editor-in-chief is Borislav Zumbulev.

The circulation of the paper is 50,000 copies during weekdays, up to 90,000 during weekends.
