= Tamara Gudima =

Russian politician (1936–2021)

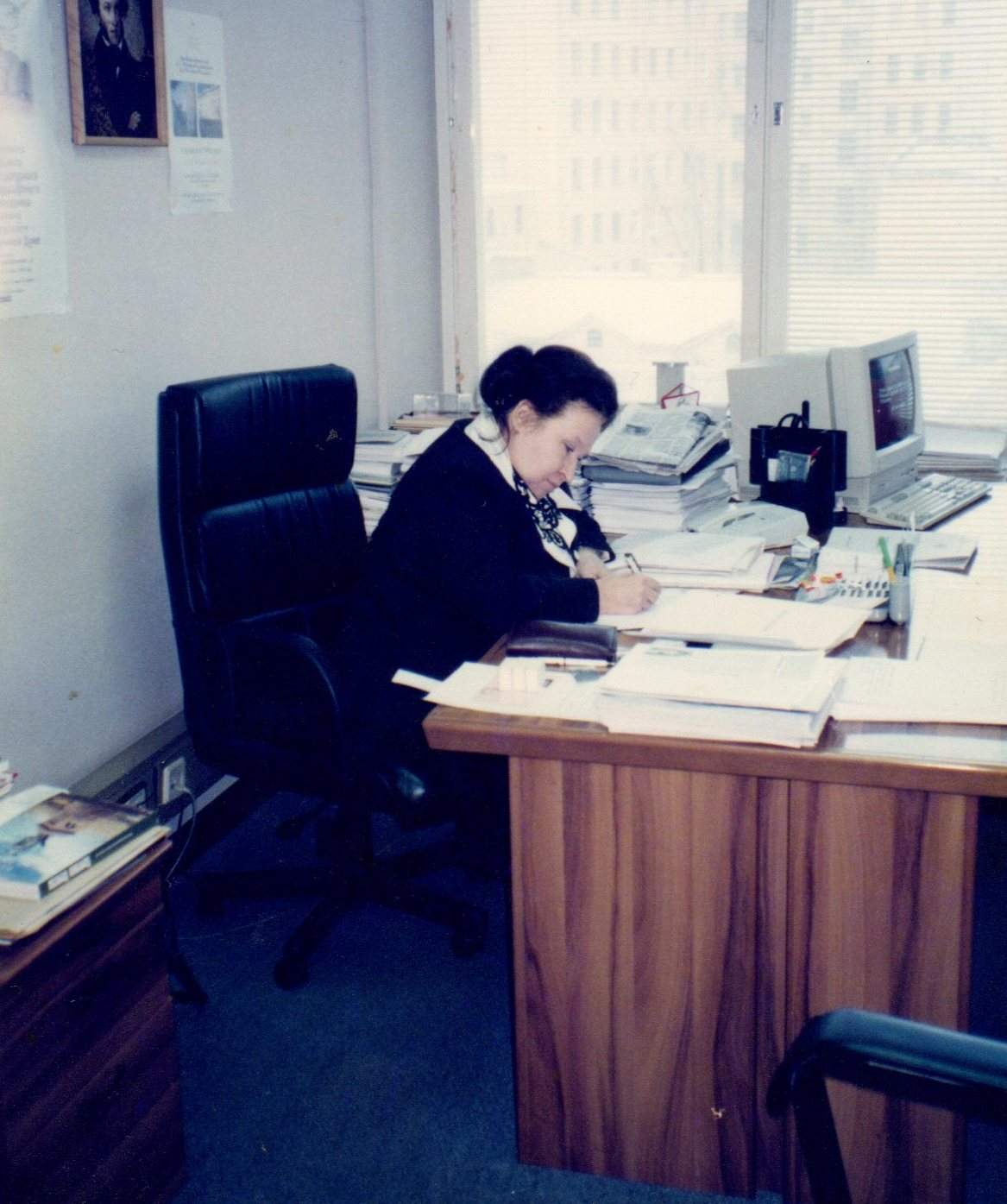

Member of the State Duma
- In office 12 December 1993 – 18 January 2000

Personal details
- Born: 5 June 1936 Arkhangelsk, Russian SFSR, Soviet Union
- Died: 19 October 2021 (aged 85) Moscow, Russia
- Party: CPSU; CPRF

Tamara Mikhaylovna Gudima (Russian: Тама́ра Миха́йловна Гуди́ма; 5 June 1936 – 19 October 2021) was a Russian politician.

In 1959 she graduated from the Arkhangelsk State Pedagogical Institute and received the specialty of a teacher of the Russian language, literature and history. In 1972 she graduated from the Academy of Social Sciences under the Central Committee of the CPSU with a degree in Marxist-Leninist philosophy, after which she worked at the Arkhangelsk Forestry Institute until 1989. From 1989 to 1991 she served as secretary of the Arkhangelsk Regional Committee of the CPSU. A member of the Communist Party of the Russian Federation, she served in the State Duma from 1993 to 2000. Member of the Duma committee for culture.

== Awards ==
- Jubilee Medal "In Commemoration of the 100th Anniversary of the Birth of Vladimir Ilyich Lenin"
- Medal "For Distinction in Guarding the State Border of the USSR"
