= Ruff Ryders Indy =

- Parent company: Universal Music Group
- Founded: 2010
- Founder: Darrin "Dee" Dean; Joaquin "Waah" Dean and T-Davis
- Distributor(s): Fontana Distribution (In the US); Universal Music Group (Outside the US)
- Genre: Various
- Country of origin: United States
- Location: New York City, New York

Ruff Ryders Indy is a record label founded by brothers Darrin Dean and Joaquin Dean. It focuses on "scouting and signing emerging talent" in hip-hop music, and in providing marketing, promotion, and consulting services to artists.

== History ==
In 2010, Joaquin and Darin Dean decided to revamp Ruff Ryders through a new venture known as Ruff Ryders Indy, as a Fontana/Universal affiliated distribution company that provides hands-on mentoring and consulting services to independent labels. Joaquin Dean has helped introduce artists like DMX, Eve, Swizz Beatz, The LOX, and others into pop culture, selling over 35 million records in the process.

Ruff Ryders Indy, Inc. has signed new artists to the label such as MOOK, Lil Waah (son of Joaquin Dean), Shella, and Hugo. The company is releasing its first new album a compilation that includes the established Ruff Ryders artists, DMX, Eve, LOX, Drag-On, Swizz Beatz, and Cassidy with the new artists entitled; Ruff Ryders Past, Present, Future on November 21, 2011, 2011. A third album by Drag-On will follow the release of the compilation, with additional music to be released by established and new artists of the label.

== Artists ==
=== Current acts ===
Act	Year signed	Albums released under Ruff Ryders Indy	Description
DMX	2011	1	DMX was signed to Ruff Ryders Indy in 2011 after his release from prison. Under Ruff Ryders Entertainment, he has released 7 albums.
Eve	2011	3	Eve signed to Ruff Ryders Indy and Re-signed to Swizz Beatz' Full Surface in 2011
Drag-On	2011	2	Drag-On was signed to Ruff Ryders Indy in 2010 as part of the management company but became an official artist when Joaquin and Darin Dean decided to revamp Ruff Ryders as Ruff Ryders Indy.
Mook	2011	—	Rapper from Harlem, New York. Waah signed Mook to his Ruff Ryder Indy label in 2011.
Lil Waah	2010	—	Joaquin Dean Jr. aka Lil Waah is the son of Joaquin Dean and signed to Ruff Ryders Indy in 2010 at the Powerhouse Studio.
Shella	2011	—	Rapper, singer, songwriter, producer, and engineer. Born and raised in Honolulu.
L.A.C. Goon	2011	—	Rapper from New York City. Signed to Ruff Ryders Indy.
El-Gwoppo	2011	—	Rapper from Brooklyn, New York. Signed to Ruff Ryders Indy through a joint venture with Fetti Boy Nation.
