= Bulgarian literature =

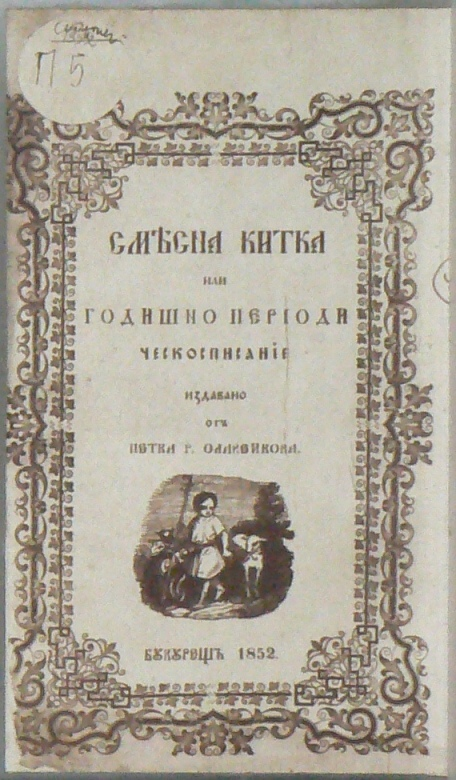
First edition of Smesena Kitka by Petko Slaveykov in 1852.

Bulgarian literature (Bulgarian: Българска литература, romanized: Bŭlgarska literatura) is literature written by Bulgarians or residents of Bulgaria, or written in the Bulgarian language; usually the latter is the defining feature. Bulgarian literature can be said to be one of the oldest among the Slavic peoples, having its roots during the late 9th century and the times of Simeon I of the First Bulgarian Empire.

Notable modern Bulgarian works of literature are The Peach Thief by Emiliyan Stanev, September by Geo Milev, Under The Yoke by Ivan Vazov, The Windmill by Elin Pelin, and Depths by Dora Gabe. The book Wild Stories (Диви разкази, Divi Razkazi) by Nikolay Haytov is included in the UNESCO Historical Collection.

== Middle Ages ==
With the Bulgarian Empire welcoming the disciples of Cyril and Methodius after they were expelled from Great Moravia, the country became a centre of rich literary activity during what is known as the Golden Age of medieval Bulgarian culture following centuries of oral tradition and epic singing in the region. In the late 9th, the 10th and early 11th century literature in Bulgaria prospered, with many books being translated from Byzantine Greek, but also new works being created. Many scholars worked in the Preslav and Ohrid Literary Schools, creating the Cyrillic script for their needs. Chernorizets Hrabar wrote his popular work An Account of Letters, Clement of Ohrid worked on translations from Greek and is credited with several important religious books, John Exarch wrote his Shestodnev and translated On Orthodox Christianity by John of Damascus, Naum of Preslav also had a significant contribution. Bulgarian scholars and works influenced most of the Slavic world, spreading Old Church Slavonic, the Cyrillic and the Glagolithic alphabet to Kievan Rus', medieval Serbia and medieval Croatia.

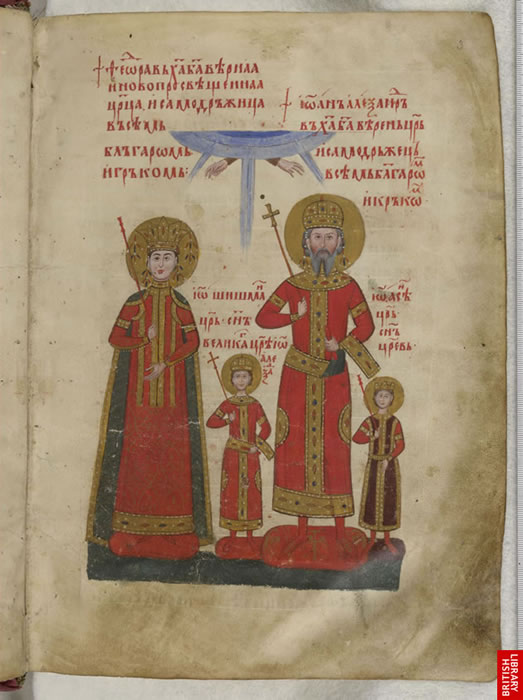
The Tetraevangelia of Ivan Alexander (1355–1356)

As the Bulgarian Empire was subjugated by the Byzantines in 1018, Bulgarian literary activity declined. However, after the establishment of the Second Bulgarian Empire followed another period of upsurge during the time of Patriarch Evtimiy in the 14th century. Evtimiy founded the Tarnovo Literary School that significantly affected the literature of Serbia and Muscovite Russia, as many writers fled abroad after the Ottoman conquest. Apart from Evtimiy, other established writers from the period were Constantine of Kostenets (1380-first half of the 15th century) and Gregory Tsamblak (1365–1420).

Medieval Bulgarian literature was dominated by religious themes, most works being hymns, treatises, religious miscellanies, apocrypha and hagiographies, most often heroic and instructive.

== Early Ottoman rule ==
The fall of the Second Bulgarian Empire to the Ottomans in 1396 was a serious blow for Bulgarian literature and culture in general. Literary activity largely ceased, being concentrated in the monasteries that established themselves as centres of Bulgarian culture in the foreign empire. The religious theme continued to be dominant in the few works that were produced.

The main literary form of the 17th and 18th century were instructive sermons, at first translated from Greek and then compiled by Bulgarians.

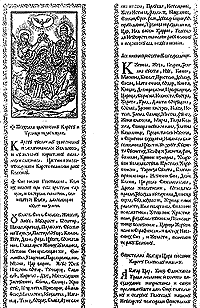
The title page of Abagar, the first printed book in modern Bulgarian (1651)

A literary tradition continued to exist relatively uninterrupted during the early Ottoman rule in northwestern Bulgaria up until the Chiprovtsi Uprising in end of the 17th century among the Bulgarian Catholics who were supported by the Catholic states of Central Europe. Many of these works were written in a mixture of vernacular Bulgarian, Church Slavonic and Serbo-Croatian and was called "Illyric". Among these was the first book printed in modern Bulgarian, the breviary Abagar published in Rome in 1651 by Filip Stanislavov, bishop of Nikopol.

The Illyrian movement for South Slavic unity affected the Bulgarian literature of the 18th and 19th century. Hristofor Zhefarovich's Stemmatographia of 1741 is thought of as the earliest example of modern Bulgarian secular poetry for its quatrains, although it was essentially a collection of engravings.

== Bulgarian National Revival ==
The nearly five centuries of Ottoman government of Bulgaria played a decisive role in the developing of the Bulgarian culture. The country was separated from the European Renaissance movements and higher forms of artistic expression and developed mostly its folklore songs and fairy-tales. A new revival of Bulgarian literature began in the 17th century with the historiographical writings of Petar Bogdan Bakshev, and in the 18th century by Paisius of Hilendar, Istoriya Slavyanobolgarskaya. Another influential work was Life and Sufferings of Sinful Sophronius by Sophronius of Vratsa.

In the period 1840–1875 the literature came alive with writings on mainly revolutionary, anti-Turkish themes. It was an earlier stage of the Bulgarian Renaissance and the most prominent poets at this time were: Vasil Drumev, Rayko Zhinzifov and Dobri Chintulov.

The noted poet and revolutionary Hristo Botev (1848–1876) worked in the late 19th century and is nowadays regarded as arguably the foremost Bulgarian poet of the period. He managed to use the living language of the folklore songs to give an expression of modern ideas, doubts and questions. His works are small in number, most of them with intensive dialogue form and strong emotional message.

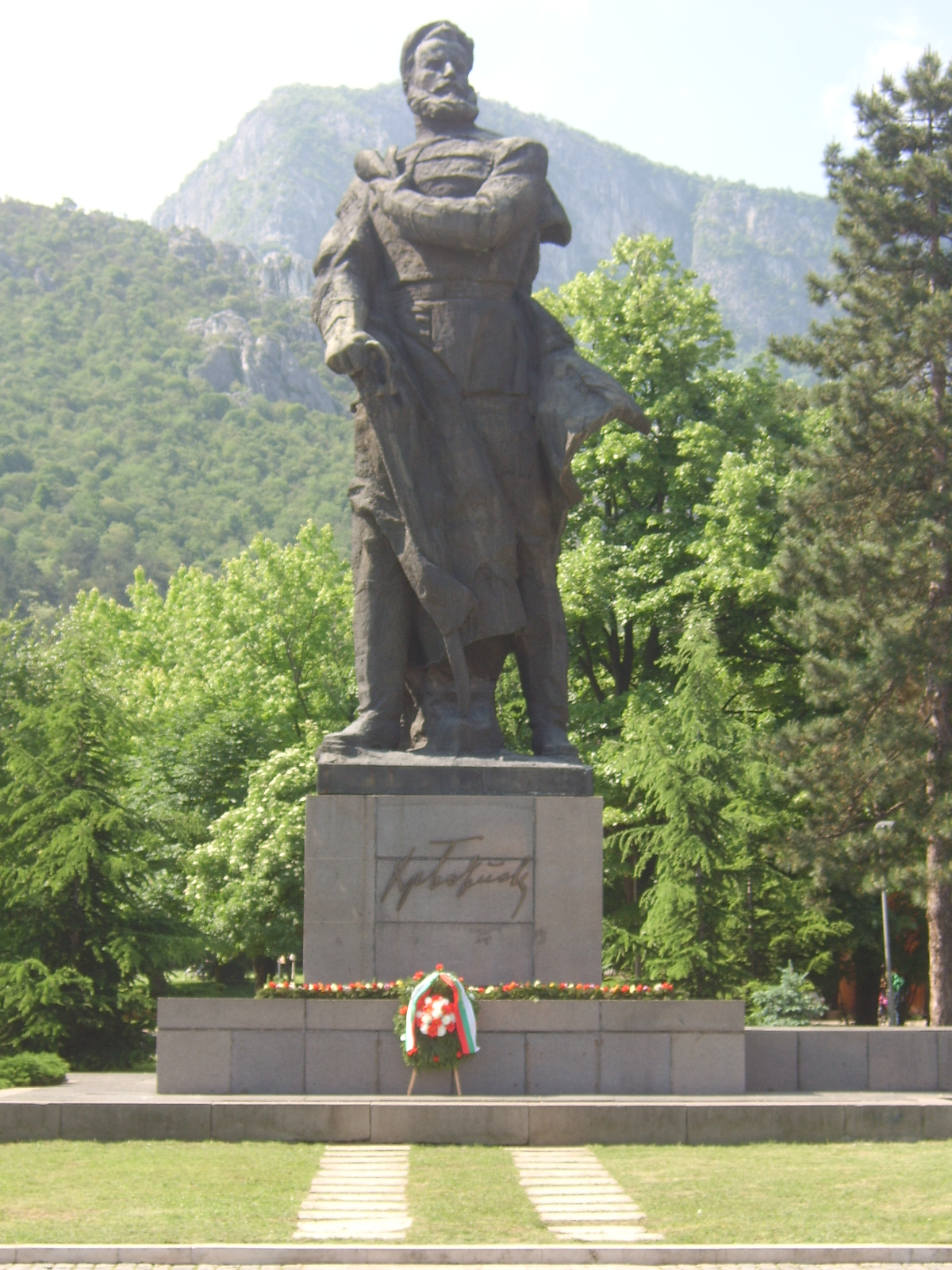
Hristo Botev monument

Among the writers who engaged in revolutionary activity were also Lyuben Karavelov and Georgi Sava Rakovski. Rakovski's best-known work, Gorski Patnik (translated as A Traveller in the Woods or Forest Wanderer) was penned during the Crimean War (1853–56) while hiding from Turkish authorities near the town of Kotel. Considered one of the first Bulgarian literary poems, it was not actually published until 1857.

A typical feature of the period was the increase of the interest in Bulgarian folklore, as figures like the Miladinov brothers and Kuzman Shapkarev made collections of folk songs and ethnographic studies. Another writer with works of great importance is Zahari Stoyanov (1850–1889) with his Memoirs of the Bulgarian Uprisings (1870–1876). His writings have historical, biographical and artistic value.

== Bulgarian literature after 1878 ==
Bulgaria received partial independence after the Russo-Turkish War (1877-1878). The recently established Bulgarian church, the developing national school system, the return of educated Bulgarians from abroad and the enthusiasm of a lately arrived Renaissance were among the factors which contributed to the forming of the new Bulgarian literature. It lost much of its revolutionary spirit, and writings of a pastoral and regional type became more common.

Ivan Vazov was the first professional Bulgarian man of letters and the founding father of the new Bulgarian literature. Vazov was very popular and productive and his works include both prose and poetry with equal virtuosity. His 1893 novel Under the Yoke, which depicts the Ottoman oppression of Bulgaria, is the most famous piece of classical Bulgarian literature and has been translated into over 30 languages. His most famous short novels include Nemili-nedragi, Chichovtzi and others; he also wrote a large number of short stories, travel writings, memoirs, essays, pieces of criticism, dramas, comedies etc. Some of the more famous collections include: Draski i sharki, Videno i chuto and others.

One of his most significant collections of poems is The Epopee of the Forgotten (1881–1884), consisting of 12 odes dedicated to the heroes of the Bulgarian history and the images and ideas which should be remembered. Other poetry collections include: Pryaporets i gusla, Tagite na Bulgaria, Gusla, Slivnitza, Luleka mi zamirisa and others.

A surprising example of early modern philosophical thought can be found in the poetic works of the renowned intellectual Stoyan Mihaylovski.

== Bulgarian modernist literature ==
The poet Pencho Slaveykov, the son of the prominent Bulgarian Renaissance poet and teacher Petko Slaveykov, is one of the most erudite writers of his time. He made a conscious effort to set the beginnings of modern literature and Modernism in the country introducing the European philosophical and metaphysical ideas, partly modified and rebuilt upon the traditional linguistic and imagery heritage.

Slaveykov is famous for his philosophical poems, his Epic Songs and the symbolist poetry collection Dream of Happiness. Among others, he wrote a mystifying anthology of poets titled On the Island of the Blissful where he gathered at one place all the traditional ideas of Bulgarian poetry at this time presenting them like belonging to an imaginary island. His epic unfinished Song of Blood (1911–13) dealt with the struggle against the Turks. In his quest, Slaveykov was supported by other prominent intellectuals – scientists, writers, poets and critics.

One of the most remarkable prose writers from the first years after the liberation is Aleko Konstantinov (1863–1897). His humorous and travel writings (Bay Ganyo; To Chicago and Back) are both shrewd and vivid. He is best remembered for his character Bay Ganyo, one of the most controversial and curious characters in the Bulgarian literature, with diverse layers and rich nuances. Similarly to Švejk of the Czechs, Tartarin of Tarascon of the French and Ostap Bender for the Russian peoples, Bay Ganyo is a collective image of many typical Bulgarian features. Although ridiculed, they could never receive a one-sided (positive or negative) evaluation and interpretation. The writer was killed accidentally just when his career was about to surge.

Along with Petko Todorov, Krastyo Krastev and Peyo Yavorov, Pencho Slaveykov established the modernist circle Misal (Thought). Krastyo Krastev is a respected literary critic and erudite. Petko Todorov (1879–1916) is one of the greatest stylists of that time. A person of European education and manners, he manages to modernize the Bulgarian drama and also wrote a series of powerful impressionist stories based on folklore motives, titled Idylls.

Peyo Yavorov (1878–1914) is considered a Symbolist poet, one of the finest poetic talents in the fin de siècle Kingdom of Bulgaria. The poems of Yavorov are diverse in topics but always with a strong impact – both emotional and intellectual. They have diverse and original forms, and rich and refined language; they are largely introspective, express the loneliness of the modern man, the impossibility to reach happiness and love in life, the constant threat and presentiment of death. They focus also on describing historical, mythological and visionary subjects with the same decadent emotional nuances.

Under the influence of the French and the Russian symbolist movements, there were other popular Bulgarian poets, quite a large number, who contributed to the fast-paced literary development in the country in the first decades of the 20th century. Among them were: Dimcho Debelyanov, Hristo Yasenov, Teodor Trayanov, Nikolay Liliev, Emanuil Popdimitrov, Dimitar Boyadjiev and many others. Symbolism turned into one of the most influential movements and it can be felt in all the poetry to come throughout the 20th century. In Bulgaria it remains close to the European one: it is again an effort to overcome reality, its burden, monotony and heaviness. The quest for meaning and foundation in a different dimension of reality: an outer, high, spiritual, mystic, unknown and unintelligible one; a new dreamlike reality which is closer to beauty and harmony. The answer is looked for not only in the images, but in the purity and beauty of language.

== Bulgarian literature between the world wars ==
Dimcho Debelyanov (1887–1916) was a poet whose death in the First World War cut off his promising literary career. His body of work was collected by friends following his death and became very popular in post-war Bulgaria. Hristo Smirnenski (1898–1923) is another talented symbolist poet with extremely melodious language whose early death could be mourned.

The interwar period in the Bulgarian literature will be remembered not only because of the dramatic social changes but also because of the reforms in the literary genres. A great part of them is associated with the figure and the activity of Geo Milev (1895–1925) who published the modernist magazine Vezni (Scale), in Sofia, contributing as a poet, translator, theatre reviewer, director, editor of anthologies and even as a painter. He experienced the influence of avant-garde movements like the German expressionism and the French surrealism. His skillful poems (The Cruel Ring (1920); The Icons Sleep (1922); September (1923)) and prose pieces (A Little Expressionist Calendar for the Year (1921)) combine traditional motives, modern ideas and experimental language. He was killed at the age of 30 and although his career did not span more than 6 years, he is greatly respected and regarded by many as one of the most influential modernist poets and translators.

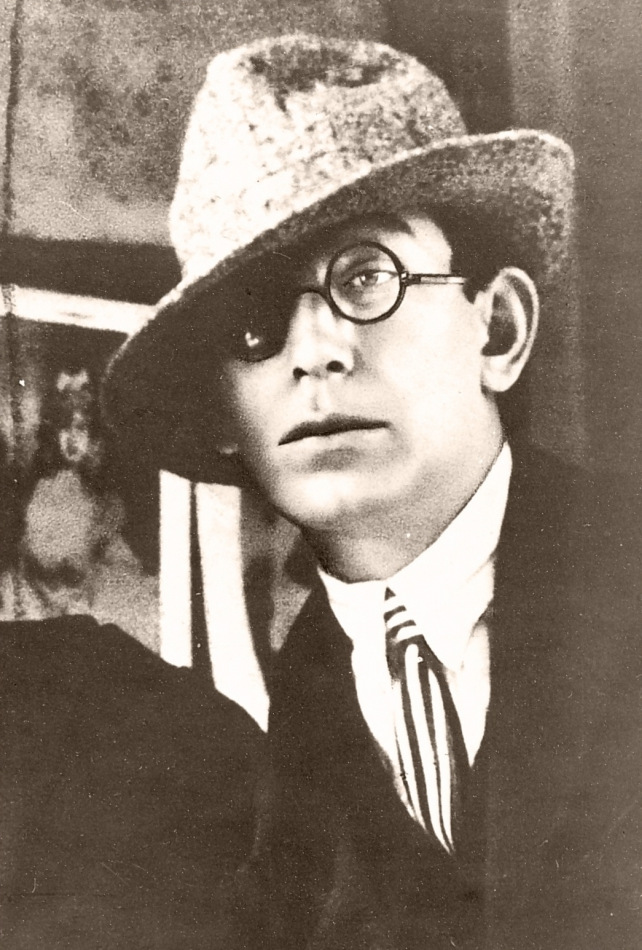
Geo Milev (1895–1925)

Bulgarian poetry will reach a new peak with another prematurely killed poet – Nikola Vaptsarov (1909–1942). He managed to publish only 1 book of poems during his lifetime (Motor Songs (1940)), in 1,500 copies. He was sentenced to death because of his underground communist activity against the Government.

Bulgarian prose flourished in the period between the world wars mainly because of the stories and the short novels of Elin Pelin (1877–1949) and Yordan Yovkov (1880–1937). Both of them were quite prolific and became popular not only in their home countries but also abroad. In their subjects, they stand close to the traditions of the realism. Both of them focus on the rural life, but Yordan Yovkov is known for his fondness of traditions and myths, while Elin Pelin is more light-hearted and witty; the latter is also a famous writer of children’s literature. Both of them used vivid, elaborate language and images.

A writer of historical novels, Fani Popova-Mutafova reached the peak of her popularity before the Second World War. However, despite her talent, she suffers repressions from the communist regime afterwards. Another significant figure from this period is the humorous writer and artist Chudomir (1890–1967) whose short stories (often no longer than 3–4 pages) are considered brilliant both in style and originality. The unique finesse of his writings has remained widely admired.

== Bulgarian literature after 1944 ==
After the Second World War Bulgarian literature fell under the control of the Communist Party and, particularly in the early years, was required to conform to the style called "Socialist realism". Dimitar Dimov (1909–1966) was forced to revise his best-selling novel Tobacco (1952), adapted for cinema as the 1962 film Tobacco, to make it acceptable from the viewpoint of socialist realism by adding Communists and working-class characters and storylines.

The writer Dimitar Talev (1898–1966) was also prevented for a time by the communist regime to publish his novels. Similarly to many other intellectuals, he was exiled to the province but continued to write. His best known work is The Iron Candlestick (1952).

Both Dimov and Talev were also renowned story-tellers with many story collections along with their novels. At the same time, even so early after the communists came to power, the development of their careers showed the ideological restrictions which writers had to face in the future.

Anton Donchev, Yordan Radichkov, Emiliyan Stanev, Stanislav Stratiev, Nikolay Haytov, Ivailo Petrov and Vera Mutafchieva are among the most talented and respected writers who managed to publish their books during the communist regime in the decades to come. Their works form the main novelesque body in the modern Bulgarian literature.

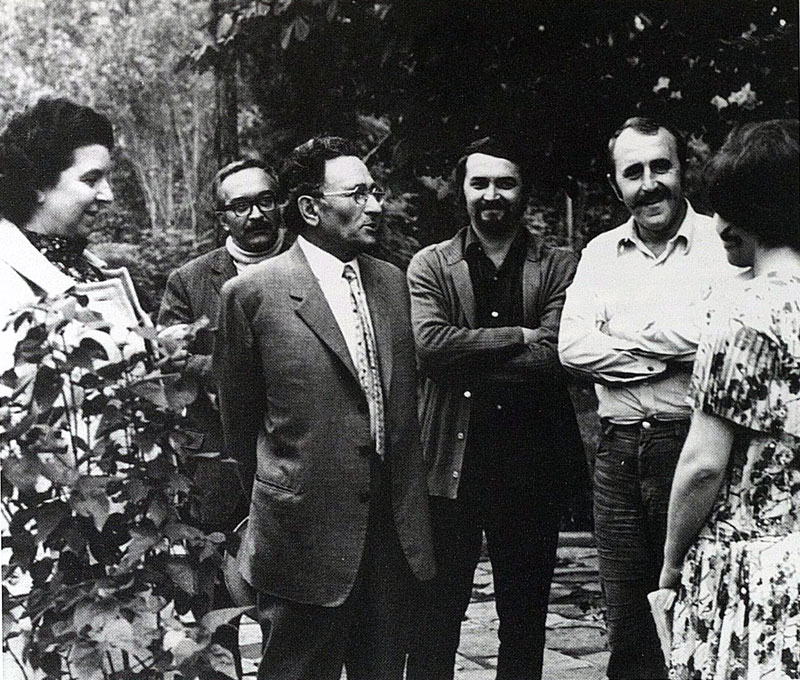
Writer Emiliyan Stanev with Directors Nikola Korabov and Rumen Surdzhiyski on the set of Ivan Kondarev

Some genres were almost sentenced to death like the crime fiction and the science fiction as very few writers cultivated them (Svetoslav Minkov, Pavel Vezhinov, Svetoslav Slavchev, Lyuben Dilov). Generally writers were tempted to turn to realist or historical subjects.

In fact, the Bulgarian national prose was not completely isolated from western literature and the ideas of surrealism, expressionism, existentialism, postmodernism, structuralism and the other theoretical paradigms. The avant-garde literature movements were scarcely and unsystematically represented until the 80s.

Nevertheless, the postwar period was the most plenteous for the still feeble modern Bulgarian poetry. Both after the political changes in 1944 and 1989, thousands of poetry collections were published.

Some of the poets who have won a stable respect with time are Atanas Dalchev (1904–1978) and Valeri Petrov. Dalchev is also remembered as one of the finest translators from a wide range of languages.

The general tendencies can be noticed there and further on. The poetry becomes more intimate and confessional, and requires more invention in order to influence or provoke; nevertheless sometimes originality turns into an end in itself; the free verse allowed higher intensity of language and diversity of forms; abstractness increased and started affecting the balance between philosophical depth and clearness; the search of lyricism is sometimes more evident than the meaning of the poems.

== After change to capitalism ==
The gradual change from communism to capitalism in the Eastern Bloc and the Fall of Berlin Wall in 1989 was followed by a considerable increase in the modern publishing both of state and private publications, as well as a complicated distribution at periods, and a consequent seemed as devaluation compared to communist status that was well established as part of the communist ideology and cultural praxis of the writer’s social status at middle 90s altogether.

However at this time strongly is felt both the presence and influence of Julia Kristeva and her novels, widely translated from French to Bulgarian. Kristeva assured the possibility of the modern written in capitalism Bulgarian novel together with many, mostly poets, Bulgarian writers who tried to define literature in her new modern ways.

Sometimes the lack state ideological dogmatism of national consensus and the emerging new ideas, novelist areas and writing styles were producing mainly experimental attitude without much need for literary criticism in Bulgaria or for overscope on literary topics, are yet other factors that make it difficult or near impossible to distinguish those more famous or influential experimenting authors, the genuine ones, or those who served the communist state ideology who only slightly changed their paradigmatic ways together with younger voices in literature and writing. Generally it is considered that some better established poets from the previous generation maintained their popularity but it scarcely reaches outside of the national borders. Some of them include: Konstantin Pavlov, Boris Hristov, Ekaterina Yosifova, Dobromir Tonev, Edvin Sugarev, Ani Ilkov, Georgi Gospodinov, Iana Boukova and Kristin Dimitrova.
