= Yana Yazova =

Bulgarian intellectual and writer (1912–1974)

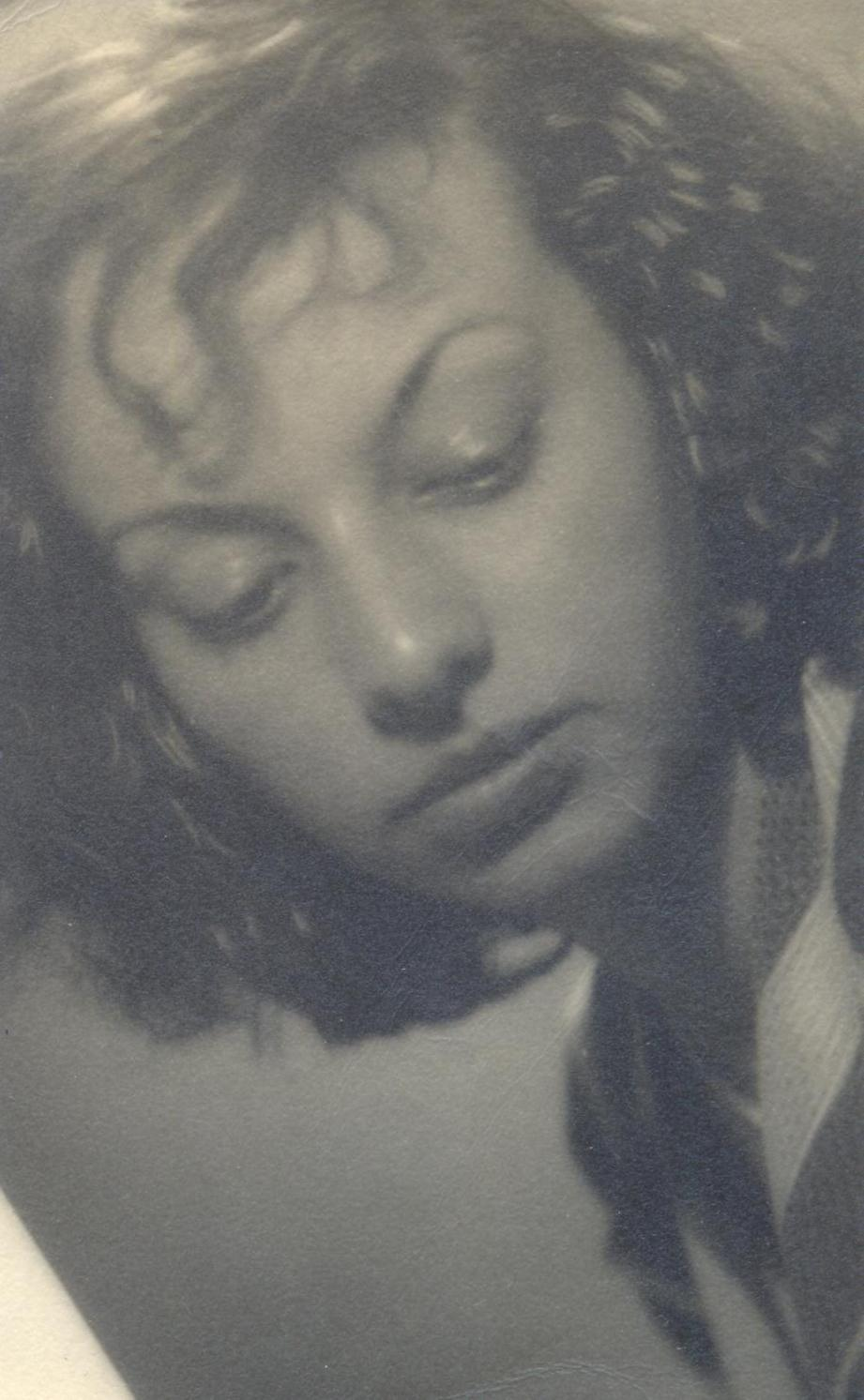
- Born: Lyuba Todorova Gancheva; 1912; Lom, Bulgaria
- Died: July 1974 (aged 61–62); Sofia, Bulgaria
- Writing career
- Pen name: Liuba Gantcheva
- Genres: Novel, poetry, travel writing

Liouba Todorova Gancheva, better known by her pen name Yana Yazova (in Bulgarian: Яна Язова), was a Bulgarian writer and intellectual born in 1912 who died in 1974.

== Life ==
Yana Yazova was born in 1912 in Lom, Bulgaria, during the Balkan Wars. Her father, Todor Ganchev, earned a doctorate in philosophy from Zurich, Switzerland, while her mother, Radka Beshiktashlieva, was the daughter of a prominent merchant from Tsargrad. Her mother worked as a teacher, and her father was a school inspector.

The family initially settled in Vidin, later moved to Plovdiv, and finally relocated to Sofia in 1930. That same year, Yana Yazova graduated from the First Girls’ High School in the capital. She pursued a master's degree in Slavic philology at St. Clement of Ohrid University of Sofia in 1935, later pursuing French philology at the Sorbonne in Paris.

Yana Yazova's life took a new turn when Professor Alexander Balabanov, 33 years her senior, became both her mentor and lover. With his support, she published her first poetry collection in 1931 at just 19 years old. The following year, she became a member of the Bulgarian Writers' Club, joining prominent literary figures like Evgenia Mars, Fani Popova-Mutafova, and Elisaveta Bagriana.

In 1940, she released a historical drama, The Last of the Pagans, and an adventure novel, The Captain, which became the first Bulgarian novel to explore drug trafficking. Both works were well received by critics. During World War II, she also co-edited the youth magazine Blok with Alexander Balabanov.

Despite her tumultuous relationship with Alexander Balabanov, which led to several public scandals, Yazova married engineer Hristo Yordanov in 1943. He died in 1959.

Yana Yazova traveled extensively through Europe and the Middle East, documenting her experiences. However, in 1944, with the communist takeover in Bulgaria, she was banned from traveling and publishing. She was pressured to write pro-communist poetry and to embrace the socialist realism movement, which she strongly rejected. As a result, she was marginalized in the literary world and chose to stop publishing in order to maintain her artistic integrity and intellectual independence. To support herself, she had to sell the items she had collected during her travels.

In the 1940s, while distanced from Bulgarian society, Yana Yazova began writing the Balkans Trilogy, which includes the novels Levski, Benkovski, and Shipka. This ambitious project, considered her most significant, involved years of in-depth research in libraries, archives, and monasteries to gather the necessary materials for her historical narrative. Though not the first historical novel in Bulgaria, the trilogy played a pivotal role in exploring the complex identities of the Balkan peoples. Through this work, Yazova sought to foster a sense of national unity and raise historical awareness among Bulgarians. However, her patriotic intent clashed with the communist regime's ideals, leading to the ban on her work's publication. It wasn't until the 1980s, long after her death, that the Balkans Trilogy was finally published, allowing her contribution to Bulgarian literature to be recognized and appreciated.

In July 1974, Yana Yazova, just 62 years old, was found murdered in her apartment in Sofia under mysterious circumstances. Her body, discovered in a state of advanced decomposition, sparked many questions. Key documents related to her state file were missing, and much of her manuscripts and personal writings vanished, with the remaining ones sold at auctions. She was buried on August 9 at the central cemetery in Sofia.

Some, including writer and literary historian Petar Velichkov, have speculated that Yana Yazova was killed by agents of the Bulgarian State Security (Държавна сигурност or ДС), who strangled her with the belt of her bathrobe and deliberately allowed her body to decompose in order to erase any evidence of the murder, motivated by her ideological opposition and refusal to conform to the communist regime. However, this theory has never been confirmed, and the case remains unresolved, with her death certificate listing only "heart attack".

The tragic end of Yana Yazova has only deepened the intrigue surrounding her life and work, particularly her commitment to Bulgarian culture and her rejection of the dogmas enforced by the regime. Her works, censored during her lifetime, were only published posthumously in the 1980s, after more than 40 years of suppression. Among them are her anti-communist novel The Salty Bay (in Bulgarian: Соленият залив) and the historical short story Alexander of Macedon (in Bulgarian: Александър Велики).

Yana Yazova was erased from the literary scene during the People's Republic of Bulgaria but has experienced a resurgence of interest in the past thirty years. While her works are not part of the official Bulgarian school curriculum, she is now acknowledged as one of the most important Bulgarian literary figures of the 20th century.

Her poetry was translated into Esperanto, Czech, Serbian and Ukrainian, which reflects the impact of her work beyond Bulgaria's borders.

== See also ==
- List of unsolved murders (1900–1979)

== Selected works ==
- Yazove, poetry (1931)
- Revolt, poetry (1934)
- Crosses, poetry (1935)
- Ana Dyulgerova, novel (1936)
- The Captain, novel (1940)
- Balkans, novel (1987–1989)
- Alexander of Macedon, novel (2002)
- Salt Gulf, novel (2003)
