= Yavorov =

Yavorov may refer to:

- Yavoriv, a city in Ukraine near the Polish border, previously named Jaworów in Polish, and Yavorov in Russian
- Peyo Yavorov (1878–1914), Bulgarian poet
- Yavorov Peak in Antarctica, named after Peyo Yavorov
- 24 SOU "P.K. Yavorov", a gymnasium in Sofia, Bulgaria, also named after Peyo Yavorov

== See also ==
- Jaworów (disambiguation)
