= Krastyo Krastev =

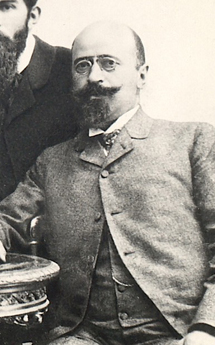
Krastyo Krastev (1866–1919), the first Bulgarian professional literary critic

Krastyo Kotev Krastev (Bulgarian: Кръстьо Котев Кръстев [ˈkrɤstjo ˈkɔtɛf ˈkrɤstɛf]; also transliterated as Krǎstjo Krǎstev, Krustyo Krustev, etc.) (31 May 1866 – 15 April 1919), popularly known as Dr. Krastev (д-р Кръстев), was a Bulgarian writer, translator, philosopher and public figure most notable as Bulgaria's first professional literary critic. Krastev was an influential member of the modernist Misal ("Thought") circle, a leading collaboration of writers that aimed to revolutionize Bulgarian literature and introduce the modern ideas of European literature and philosophy to the country.

== Biography ==
Krastyo Krastev was born in the Ottoman town of Pirot (then part of the empire's Niš district in Danube Province), today in eastern Serbia. He began his education in his hometown, where he finished a Bulgarian progymnasium (junior high school). Along with a wave of Bulgarian refugees, his family had to move to the newly established Principality of Bulgaria in 1878, as Pirot was ceded to the Principality of Serbia by the Treaty of Berlin. Krastev's family settled in the capital Sofia, where he enrolled at the First Sofia High School for Boys.

Owing to the high school curriculum's focus on classical languages, he studied Ancient Greek along with French, German, Russian, shorthand and other subjects. While still at high school, Krastev worked as a shorthand writer for the National Assembly of Bulgaria. Krastev finished high school in 1885, and in 1888 graduated in philosophy from the University of Leipzig in the German Empire, where he wrote a doctorate under Wilhelm Wundt, the father of experimental psychology. His doctorate discussed Hermann Lotze's metaphysical concept of the soul. Krastev was engaged in literary criticism while still in Leipzig, where he wrote a study on Ivan Vazov's poetical works.

After his graduation, Krastev returned to Bulgaria to become the headmaster of the Kazanlak pedagogical school (1888–1890) and then a teacher of logic, psychology and ethics at the First Sofia High School for Boys (1890–1891). In 1892, he was employed by the Bulgarian Ministry of Foreign Affairs as a translator. After the opening of Sofia University, Krastev was appointed as a lecturer of philosophy in 1895; he taught philosophy at the Sofia University in 1895–1896, 1899–1907, and 1908–1919. In 1899–1904, he was again a teacher at the First Sofia High School for Boys, and in 1907–1908 he was the headmaster of the Bulgarian pedagogical school in Skopje, Macedonia. Accepted by the Bulgarian Literary Society (today Bulgarian Academy of Sciences) as a correspondent member in 1898, he was made a full member in 1900. Krastev died in Sofia in 1919.

== Work ==
From 1888 on, Krastev gained prominence among the Bulgarian literary society with his regular publications of critics and reviews in the press. He was the editor of a literary magazine while still in Kazanlak, and in 1891 he published the Kritika ("Critic") magazine, the first Bulgarian magazine devoted to literary criticism. He is best remembered as the editor-in-chief of the literary magazine Misal ("Thought"), the leading literary magazine in Bulgaria before World War I, and as being an inseparable part of the eponymous circle formed around it. The circle, which consisted of Krastev, Pencho Slaveykov, Peyo Yavorov and Petko Todorov, aimed to introduce modernism to the Bulgarian public and to develop an aesthetic sense in the readers. Its goal was also to introduce European influences in Bulgarian literature while retaining its unique characteristics. Misal was issued between 1892 and 1907.

As a critic, Krastev contributed to a large number of Bulgarian magazines and newspapers, and had extensive studies on modern Bulgarian literature published in prominent foreign publications such as the Saint Petersburg-based Sovremennik and Vestnik Evropy and the Internationale Wochenschrift from Berlin. He was often critical towards the "old" representatives of Bulgarian literature, such as Vazov, Zahari Stoyanov, Elin Pelin, and Lyuben Karavelov, as he was more favourable towards the modern trends and "young" writers, the careers of some of which his reviews boosted. Krastev's philosophical views have been described as emphasizing subjective idealism while being nevertheless eclectic in nature. Krastev was a staunch opponent of Ludwig Büchner's materialism and his Bulgarian supporters, and his aesthetic views were influenced by neo-Kantianism. Krastev's work as a translator is also notable: he published Bulgarian translations of Lessing's Emilia Galotti, Henrik Ibsen's John Gabriel Borkman, When We Dead Awaken, Ghosts and An Enemy of the People and works by Descartes.
