= Ivan Vazov =

Bulgarian writer and poet (1850–1921)

- Иван Минчов Вазов
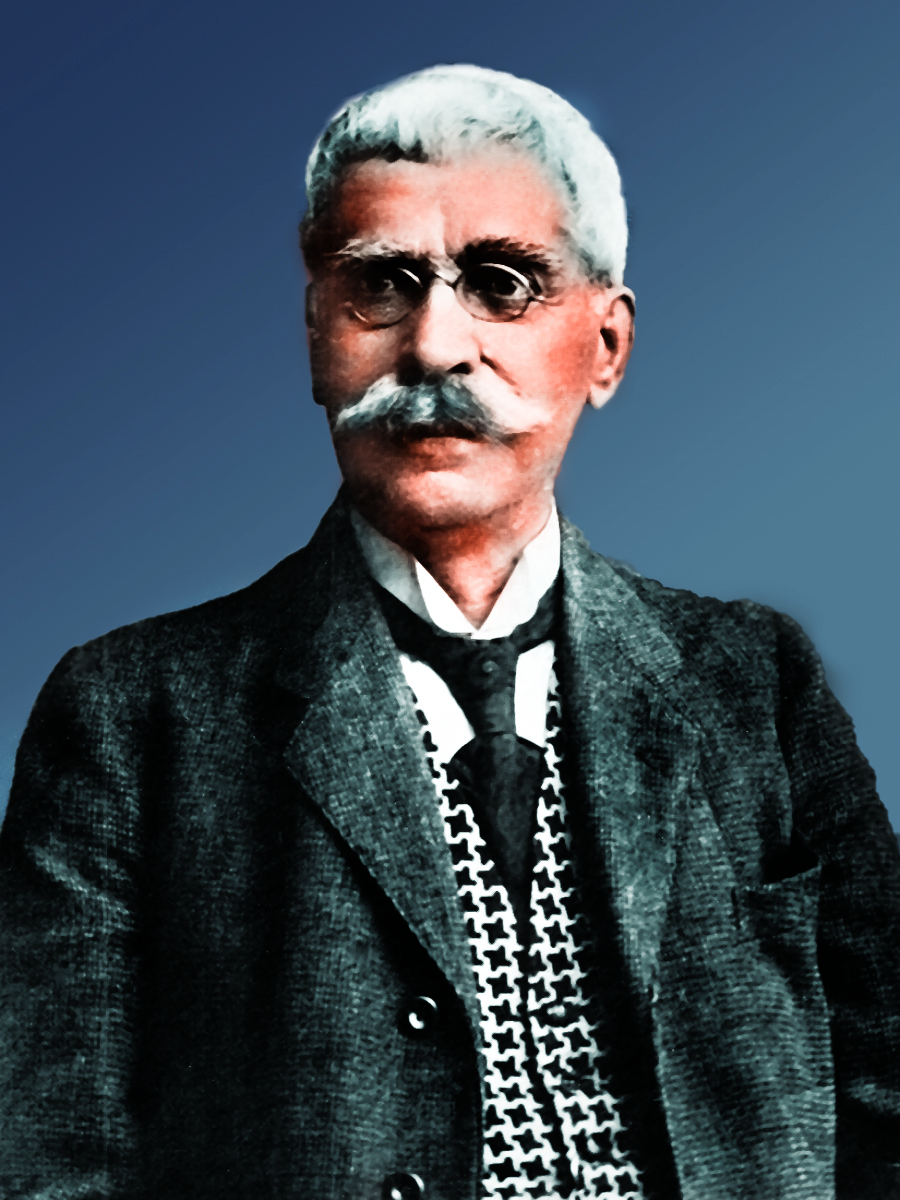
- Contemporary image of writer, Ivan Vazov
- Born: 9 July 1850; Sopot, Rose Valley, Bulgaria, Ottoman Empire
- Died: 22 September 1921 (aged 71)
- Occupations: poet, novelist, playwright
- Known for: Patriarch of Bulgarian literature
- Partner: Evgenia Mars
- Parent(s): Saba and Mincho Vazov

Ivan Minchov Vazov (Bulgarian: Иван Минчов Вазов; 9 July [O.S. 27 June] 1850 – 22 September 1921) was a Bulgarian poet, novelist, and playwright, often referred to as "the Patriarch of Bulgarian literature". He was born in Sopot, a town in the Rose Valley of Bulgaria (then part of the Ottoman Empire). The works of Ivan Vazov reveal two historical epochs - the Bulgarian Renaissance and the Post-Liberation (from Ottoman Empire rule) epoch. Ivan Vazov holds the highest honorary title of the Bulgarian Academy of Sciences - Academician. He acted as Education and People Enlightenment Minister from September 7, 1897, until January 30, 1899, representing the People's Party.

== Biography and major works ==
The exact date of Vazov's birth is disputed. His parents, Saba and Mincho Vazov, both had a lot of influence on the young poet.

After Ivan finished primary school in Sopot, Mincho sent him to Kalofer, appointing him assistant teacher. Having done his final exams in Kalofer, the young teacher returned to Sopot to help in his father's grocery. The following year his father sent him to Plovdiv to Naiden Gerov's school. There Vazov made his first steps as a poet.

He returned to Sopot only to leave for Oltenița in Romania, as his father wanted him to become an apprentice and study trade at his uncle's. Ivan Vazov showed no interest in the trade profession whatsoever. Instead he was immersed in literature. Soon he fled from his uncle's place and went to Brăila where he lived with the Bulgarian exiled revolutionaries and met Hristo Botev, a Bulgarian revolutionary and poet.

In 1874, he joined the struggle for his country's independence from the Ottoman Empire. He returned to Sopot in 1875, where he became a member of the local revolutionary committee. After the failure of the April Uprising of 1876, he had to flee the country, going back to Galaţi, where most of the surviving revolutionaries were exiled. There he was appointed a secretary of the committee.

Vazov was probably heavily influenced by Botev, who was the ideological leader of the Bulgarian revolutionary movement. He started writing his famous poems with Botev and some other Bulgarian emigrants in Romania. In 1876 he published his first work, Priaporetz and Gusla, followed by "Bulgaria's Sorrows" in 1877.

Bulgaria regained its independence in 1878 as a result of the Russo-Turkish War and Vazov wrote the famous Epic of the Forgotten. He became the editor of the political reviews Science and Dawn. He was, however, forced into exile once again, this time to Odesa, because of the persecution of the russophile political faction. Returning to Bulgaria with the help of his mother Saba Vazova, he started teaching. Vazov's next stay was in Svishtov, where he became a civil servant.

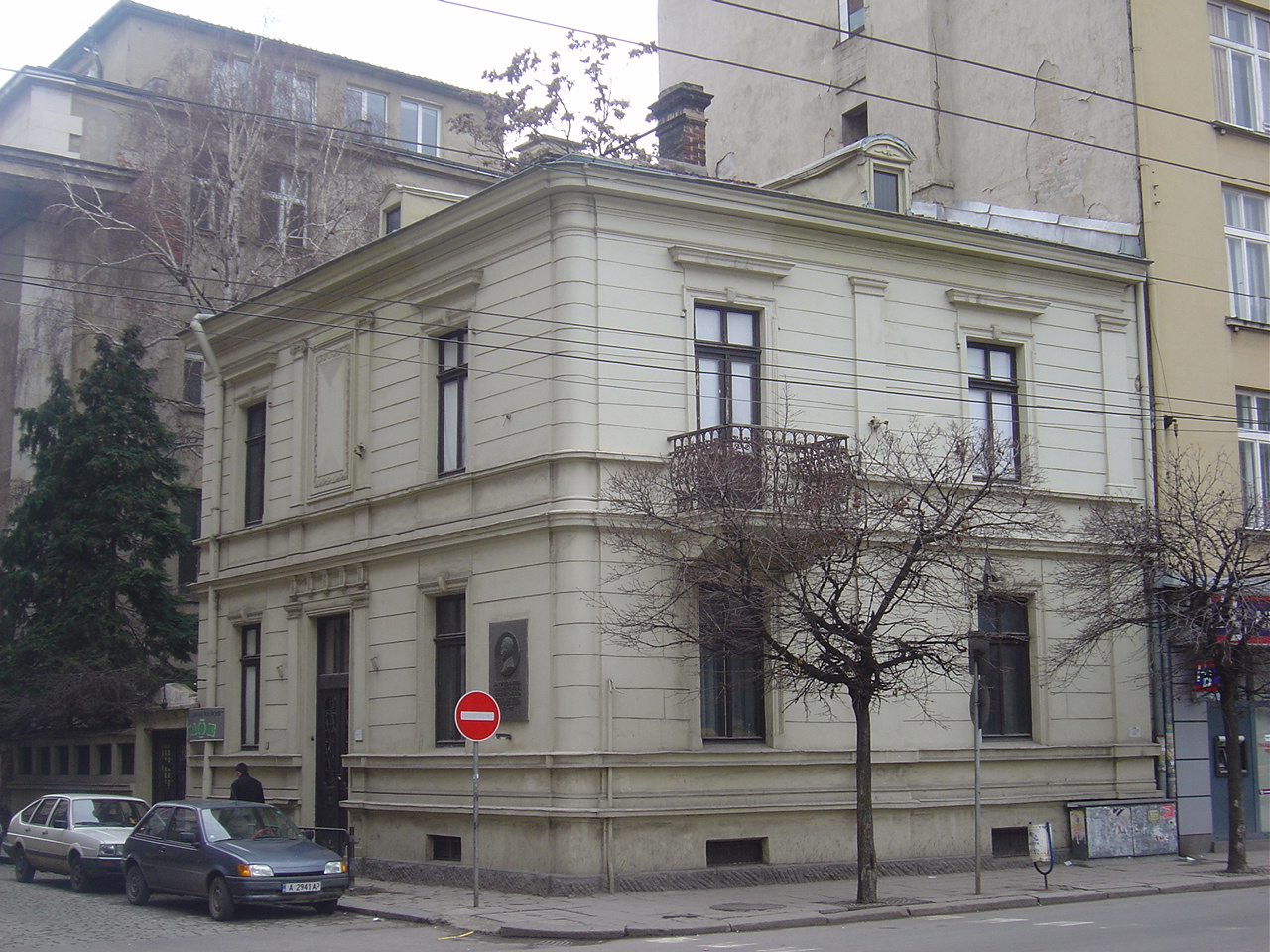
Ivan Vazov's house, now a museum, in Sofia, Bulgaria

He moved to Sofia in 1889 where he started publishing the review Dennitsa.

Vazov's 1888 novel Under the Yoke, which depicts the Ottoman oppression of Bulgaria, is the most famous piece of classic Bulgarian literature and has been translated into over 30 languages.

Later in his life Vazov was a prominent and widely respected figure in the social and cultural life of newly independent Bulgaria. He died on September 22, 1921.

== Other famous works ==
Some of the other famous works by Vazov include the novels New Country (1894), Under Our Heaven (1900), The Empress of Kazalar (1902), Songs of Macedonia (1914), It Will Not Perish (1920) and the plays Vagabonds (1894), A Newspaperman? (1900), Borislav (1909) and Ivaylo (1911).

Vazov also wrote the first Bulgarian science fiction story The Last Day of XX Century (1899), the first Bulgarian fantasy poem In the Kingdom of the Fairies (1884) and some other fantasy poetry.

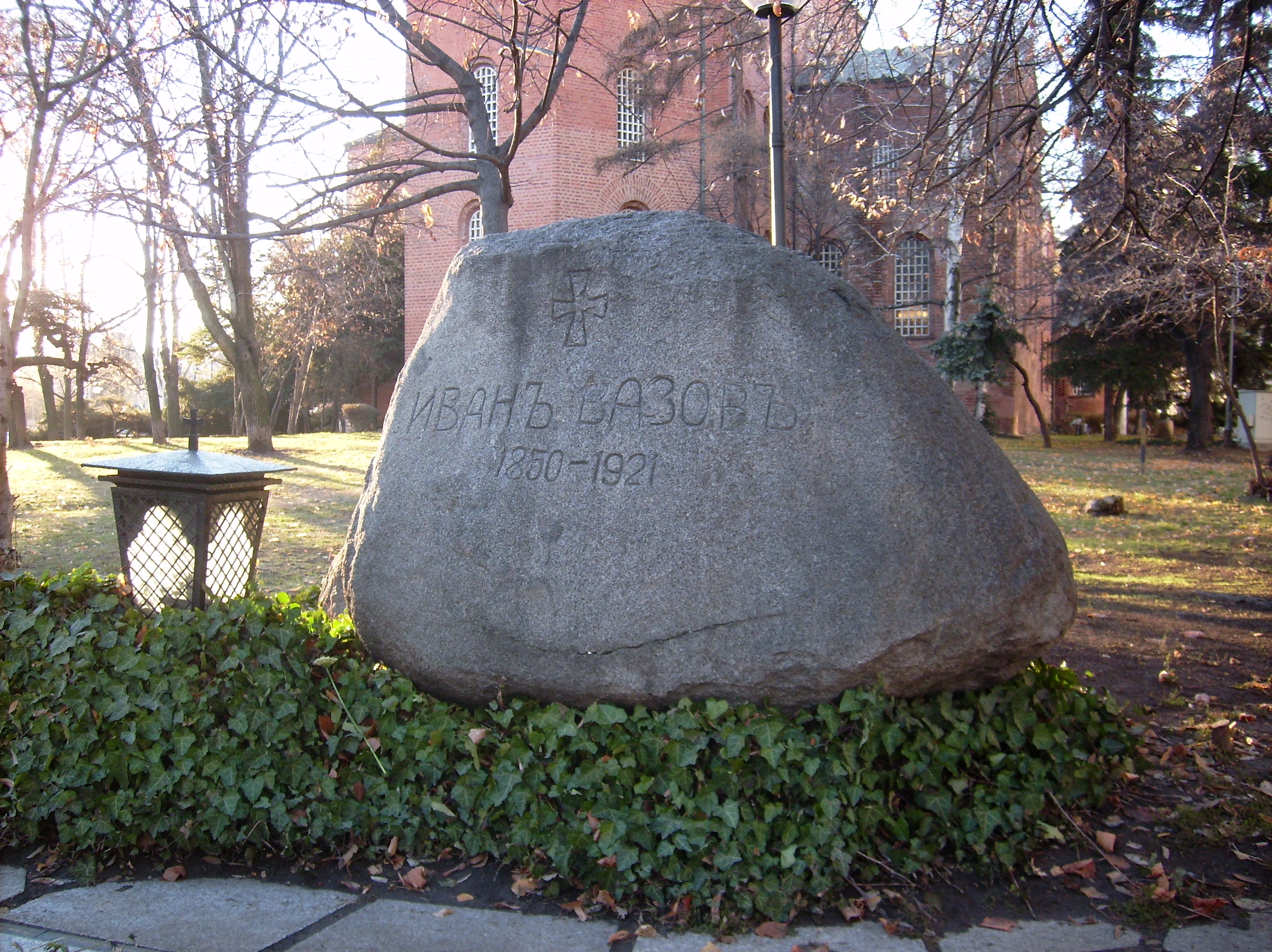
Vazov's grave in the center of Sofia. In the background is St. Sofia Church. The tomb itself is composed of syenite stone, sourced from the Vitosha mountains, where Vazov loved to have walks. (42°41.799′N 23°19.943′E)

== Historical site ==
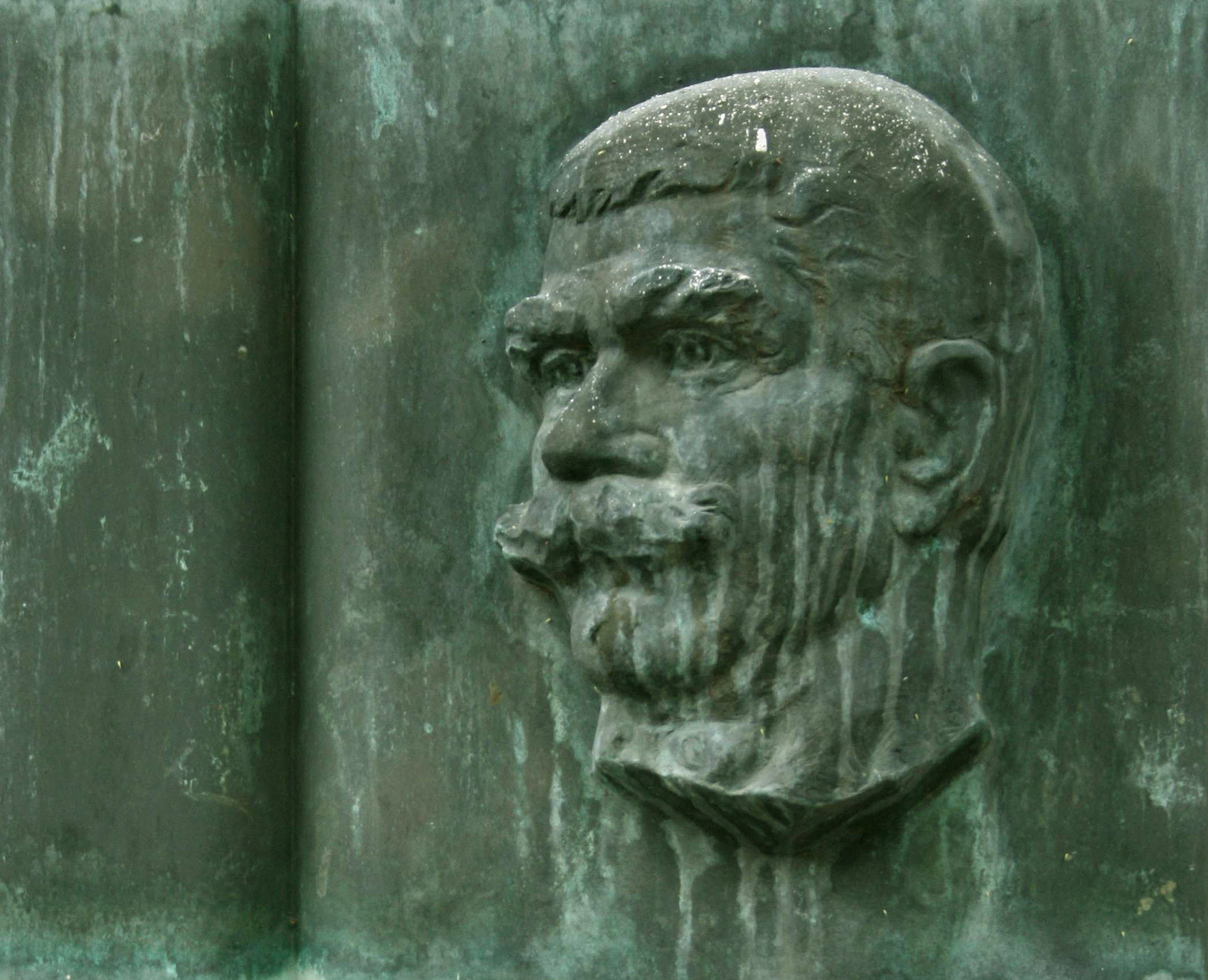
Vazov's bas-relief at Vazovova Street, Bratislava

Vazov's home in Sofia has been turned into a museum, containing a restoration of his residence with period furnishings, as well as Vazov's taxidermically preserved dog. Although the museum is ostensibly open Tuesday through Saturday, it is in practice not always staffed, so visitors are advised to call in advance. The museum is located at the corner of Ivan Vazov Street and Georgi S. Rakovski Street in Sofia. Another gem of a museum is his large home in Berkovitsa. It is filled with poetry combined with old photographs of the area and the revolution, blown up to poster size. The second floor has two large meeting rooms, one for men, the other for women. Platform couches doubled as beds.

== Honours ==
The Bulgarian Ivan Vazov National Theatre in Sofia is named after him, the "Ivan Vazov" neighborhood in Sofia, as is the Ivan Vazov National Library (Bulgarian: Народна библиотека "Иван Вазов") in Plovdiv. A park near St. Sofia Church in Sofia features the city's best-known monument to Vazov.

Vazovova Street in Bratislava, Slovakia, and Vazov Point and Vazov Rock on Livingston Island in the South Shetland Islands, Antarctica are also named after him.

In 1917, he was nominated for the Nobel Prize in literature.

A crater on the planet Mercury was named in his honor in June 2020.

== See also ==
- Bulgarian literature
- Zahari Stoyanov
- Pencho Slaveykov
- Peyo Yavorov
- National awakening of Bulgaria
