= A Newspaperman? =

Bulgarian comedy play

Вестникар ли? Vestnikar li? (A Newspaperman?)
- Written by: Ivan Vazov
- Characters: Pavel Mishemorov; Lisaveta; Bozhana; Ivancho; Derkovich; Dragan; Lazarov
- Original language: Bulgarian
- Genre: Comedy
- Setting: Late Bulgarian revival (The end of 19th century)

Premiere
- Date premiered: 1900

A Newspaperman? (Bulgarian: Вестникар ли? / Vestnikar li?) is a comedy play written by the Bulgarian writer, poet and playwright Ivan Vazov first published in 1900.

In a comical manner, the play presents the author's intolerance of the tabloid press which engulfed the lives of the people. “A Newspaperman?” is a next step in the development of the Bulgarian drama after the works of the pioneers in the scope Dobri Voynikov and Vasil Drumev.

The best known production of the play is probably the 1982 TV adaptation directed by Asen Trayanov, featuring the leading Bulgarian comic actors Georgi Partsalev and Georgi Kaloyanchev.

== Synopsis ==
Pavel Mishemorov is a middle-class bourgeois who despises the profession of the pressman. He is disgusted by the invasion of the tabloid press. In his opinion, every journalist is a scoundrel. Alas, his daughter Bozhana is in love with a journalist. She tells to her mother about her passion but how should they inform Mishemorov. The occupation of her sweetheart is kept in secret until one day it all comes to light.

== Characters ==
- Pavel Mishemorov: a bourgeois, the head of the family.
- Lisaveta: the Mishemorov's wife.
- Bozhana: the Mishemorov and Lisaveta's daughter.
- Ivancho: the Mishemorov's fellow.
- Derkovich: a tabloid newspaperman.
- Dragan: the Mishemorov and Lisaveta's son.
- Lazarov: a journalist, the Bozhana's sweetheart.
