= Codesido (crater) =

Crater on Mercury

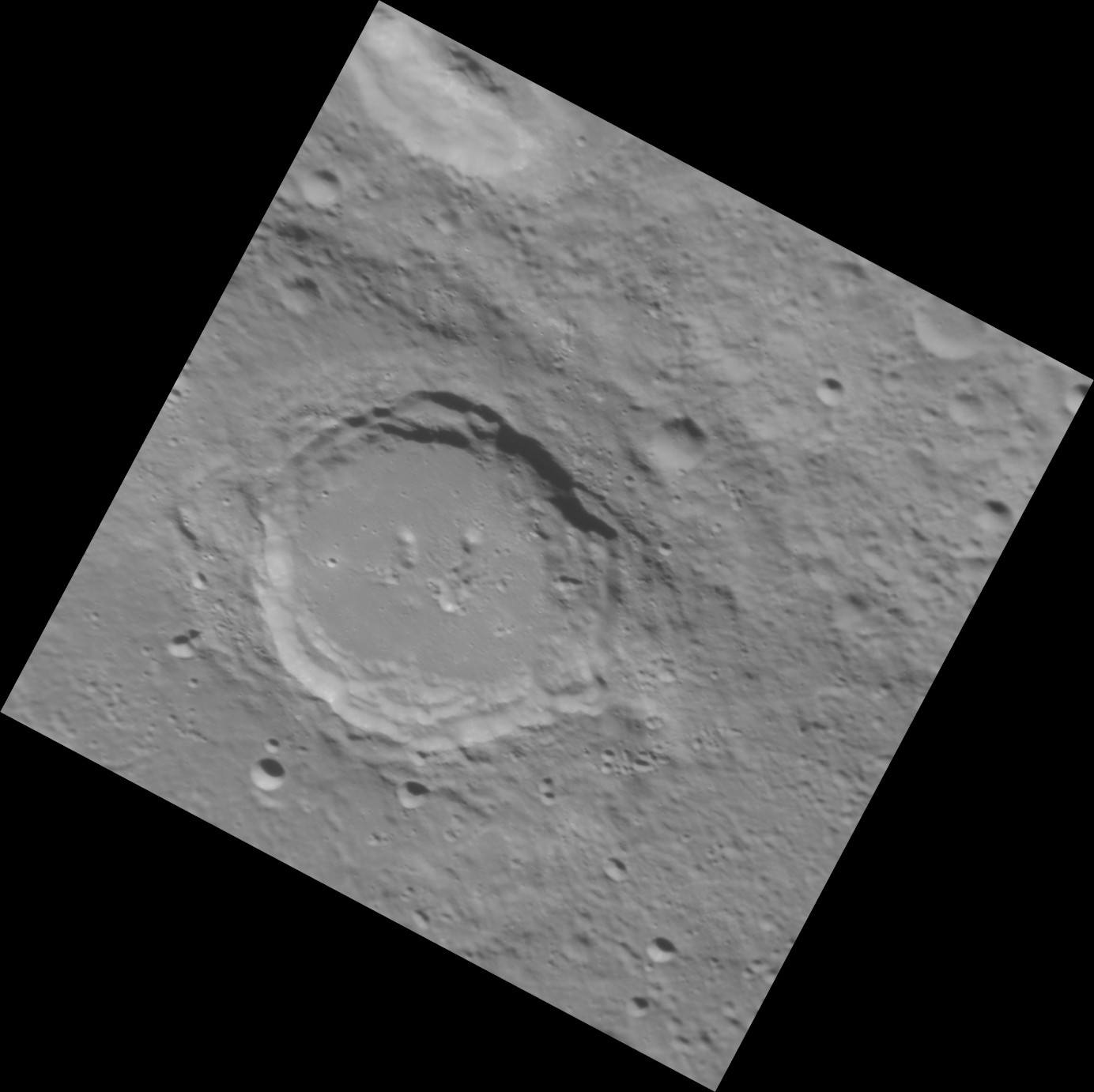
- MESSENGER NAC
- Planet: Mercury
- Coordinates: 68.19°S 206.99°W
- Quadrangle: Bach
- Diameter: 64.0 km (39.8 mi)
- Eponym: Julia Codesido

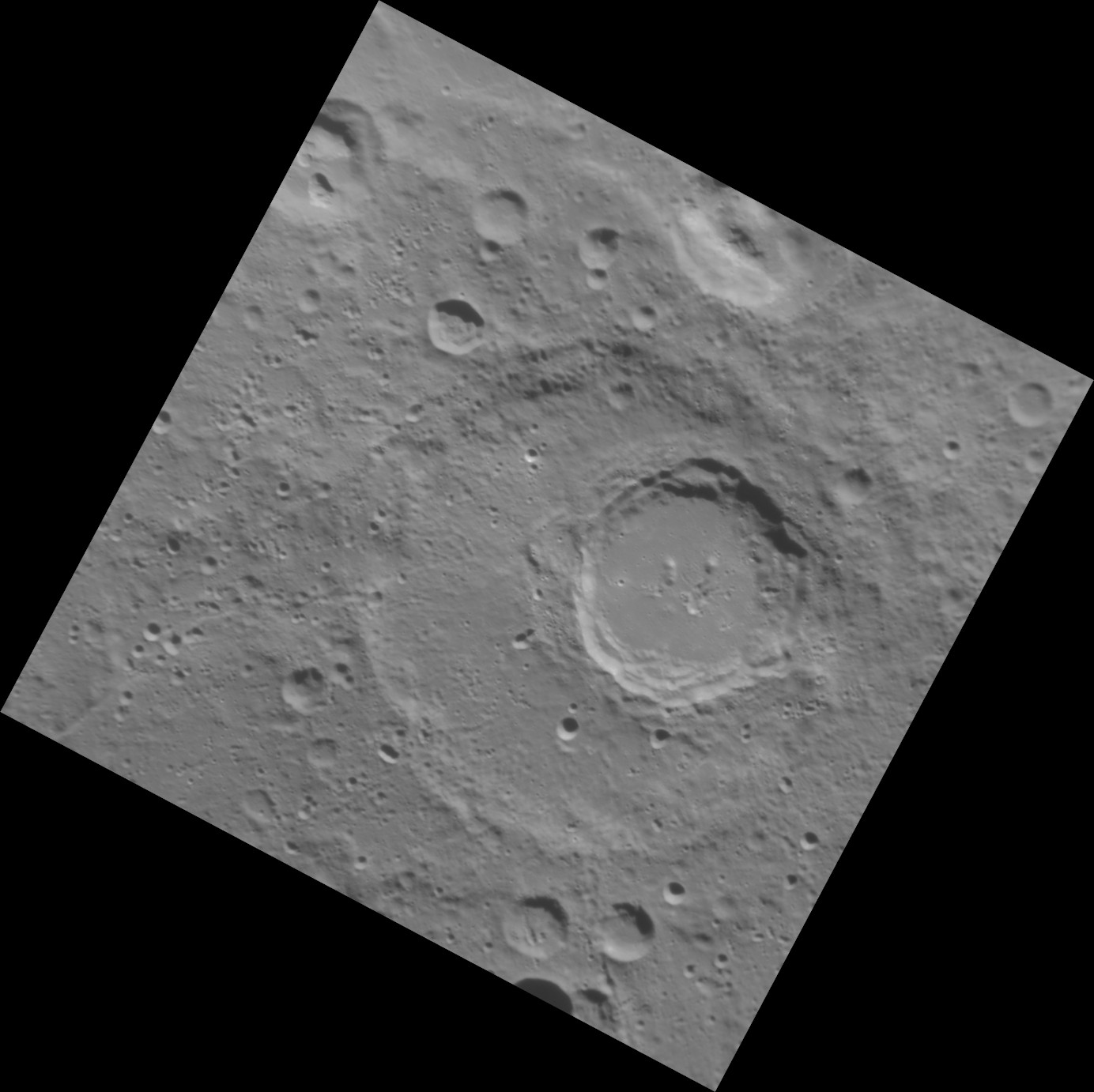
Codesido lies within a larger, unnamed crater

Codesido is a crater on Mercury, whose name was adopted by the International Astronomical Union (IAU) on November 14, 2024. The crater is named for Peruvian artist Julia Codesido.

Codesido is southeast of Vazov crater, and northeast of Freire crater.
