= Petko Todorov =

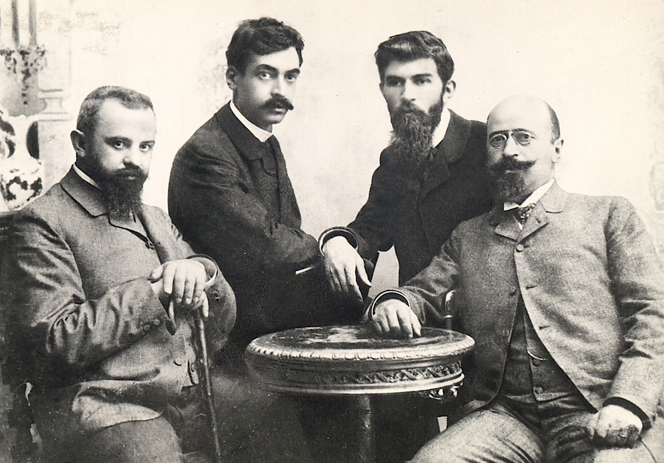
From left to right, Pencho Slaveykov, Peyo Yavorov, Petko Todorov, and Krastyo Krastev

Petko Iurdanov Todorov (Elena, September 26, 1879 – February 14, 1916, Château-d'Œx) was a Bulgarian writer, journalist, dramatist, poet and critic.

== Biography ==
He is cited as the originator of the Romantic short story in Bulgaria although this is true only for his earlier texts because he soon progressed to deeper and newer psychological observations and experimental techniques such as interior monologue.

As part of the intellectual circle ‘Misal’ (Thought) he worked along some of the greatest Bulgarian writers of the late 19th and early 20th century, such as Pencho Slaveykov and Peyo Yavorov who were his close friends. Together they put a considerable effort to modernize Bulgarian literature through contemporary philosophic, ethic and aesthetic ideas and are cited as the originators of modernism in the country; they are also associated with philosophical individualism.

Petko Todorov was born in a prominent Bulgarian National Revival family (a relative of Stoyan Mihaylovski, the nephew of religious leader Stoyan Mihaylovski, better known as Ilarion Makariopolski). Initially influenced by the ideas of socialism, lately he revised his understandings. He studied law in Bern and literature in Leipzig, travelled through France, Germany, Switzerland, Russia, Italy, Poland, Czechoslovakia and Ukraine, and focused on his literary career after the first years of the 20th century. Among his preferred authors were Alexander Pushkin, Leo Tolstoy, Mikhail Lermontov and Gustave Flaubert among others. An important influence was Henrik Ibsen and through Todorov he exercised a strong impact on contemporary Bulgarian drama.

While Slaveykov and Yavorov were most famous as poets, Todorov turned into the par excellence representative of modernist prose and drama in the country. Todorov interweaved the fantastic with the realistic, placing an emphasis on folklore poetic, and is best known for his stylistically brilliance in the short stories ‘Idilii’ (Idylls, 1908) and his dramas ‘Zidari’ (The Builders also known as Masons, 1902) and ‘Zmeyova svatba’ (Zmei's Wedding, 1910). Among his best known stories are: ‘Ovchari’ (Shepherds); ‘Mechkar’ (Bear-Ward); ‘Slunchova zhenitba’ (Sun's Wedding); ‘Nesretnik’ (Unfortunute); ‘A Memory’ (Spomen); ‘Orisnitzi’ (Fates); ‘Senokos’ (Haymaking).

== Bibliography ==
- Лукова, Калина Грозева, Петко Ю. Тодоров - концептуализация на междужанровите пространства, София, Издателско ателие Аб, 1999. P. I. Todorov's Life and Works
- P. I. Todorov's Life (In Bulgarian) ("Речник по нова българска литература (1978–1992)", Хемус, С. 1994; автори на статията: Е. Константинова, П. Ватова)
- Atanasov, Toma, P. I. Todorov's Life and Works (In Bulgarian)
- Zmei's Wedding in Bulgarian
- The Builders in Bulgarian

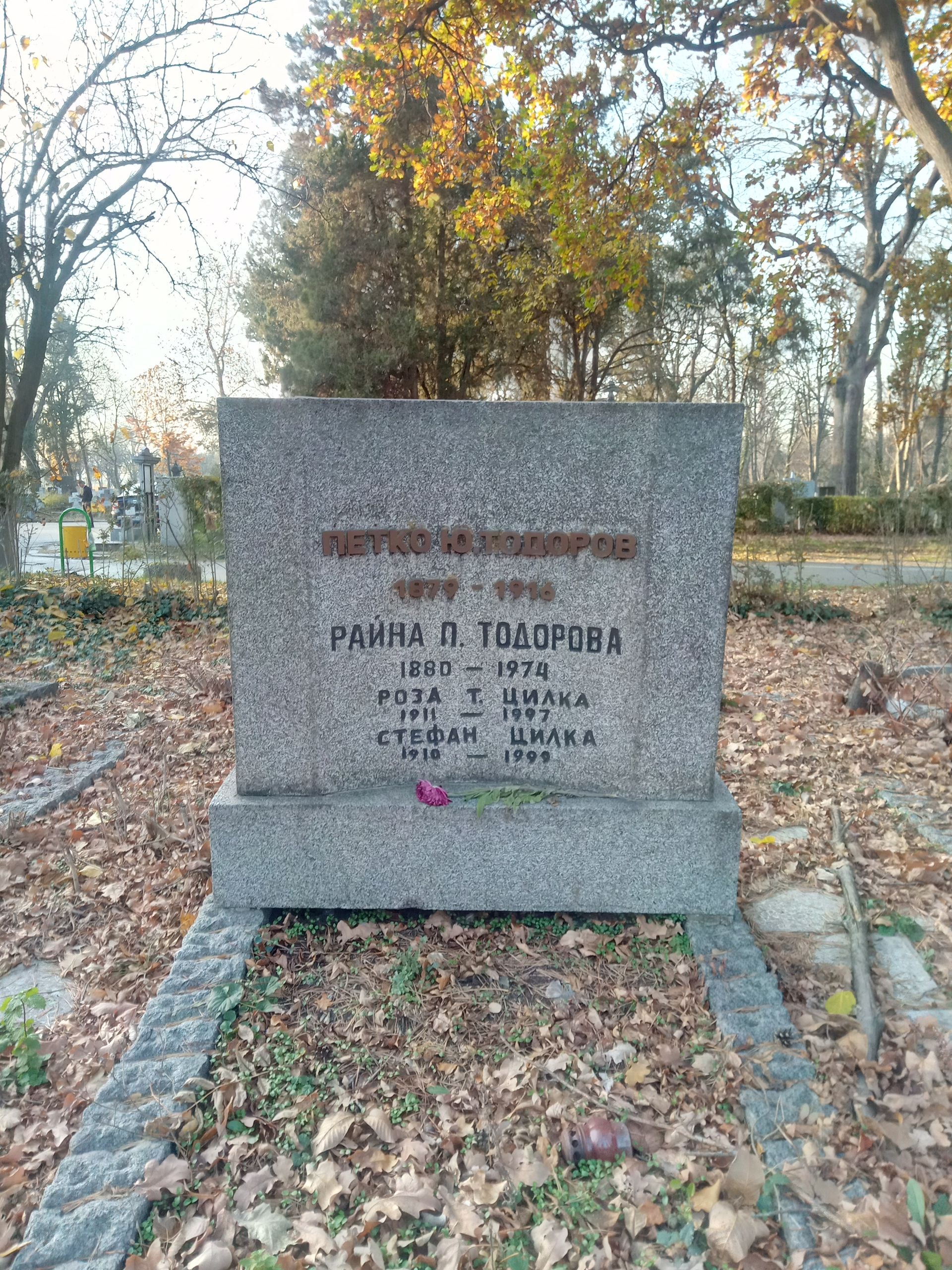
The grave of Petko Iurdanov Todorov in Central Sofia Cemetery (42°42′47.7″N 023°20′02.0″E)
