= Do you give Balkandzhi Yovo, nice Yana to the Turkish faith? =

Bulgarian folk song

Do you give Balkandzhi Yovo, nice Yana to the Turkish faith? (Bulgarian: Даваш ли, даваш балканджи Йово, хубава Яна на турска вяра?) is a reworked text by Pencho Slaveikov based on the Bulgarian folk song „Come on, give it, Nikola”, recorded and first published by Stjepan Verković in 1860 in the collection „Folk Songs of the Macedonian Bulgarians”. It is presumed the original song was performed in the villages of Skotoussa (Bulgarian: Просеник) and the extinct village of Krasohori, (Bulgarian: Лехово) (near Agkistro), both in Greece today. Some authors suppose this song is possibly a deception. It reflects the events surrounding the uprising in Yana.

== See also ==
- Bulgarian folklore
