= Ivan Vazov National Library =

Coordinates: 42°8′22″N 24°44′46″E

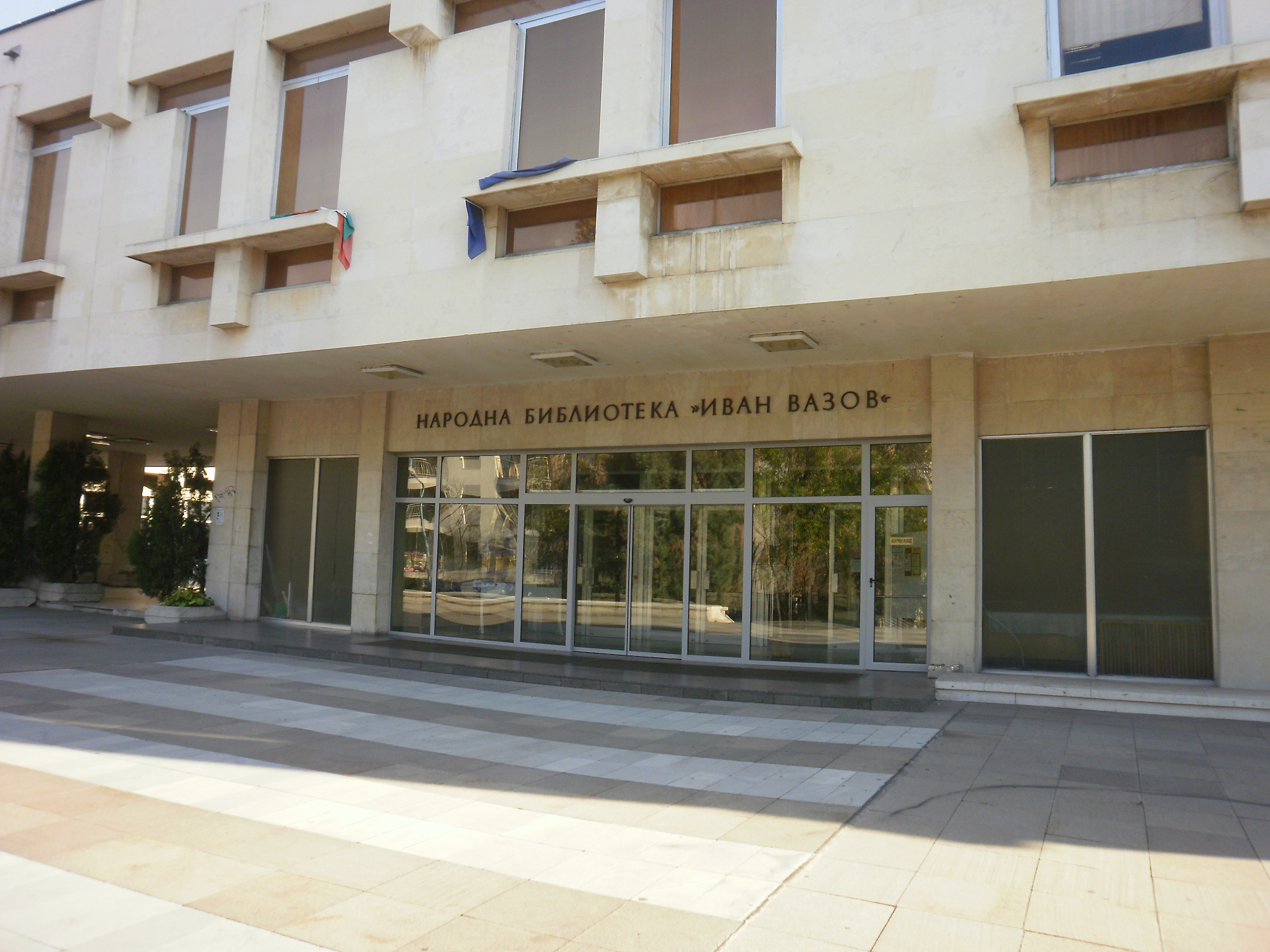
Ivan Vazov National Library.

The Ivan Vazov National Library (Bulgarian: Народна библиотека "Иван Вазов", romanized: Narodna biblioteka "Ivan Vasov") is a library situated in Bulgaria's second largest city, Plovdiv. It is named after the famous Bulgarian writer and poet Ivan Vazov.

It is the nation's second largest library containing more than 1,500,000 books. The library is also Bulgaria's second oldest, founded in 1879. In 1974 it was moved to a new edifice to the south of the City Garden. The library boasts 134 employees including 90 high-qualified specialists and research scholars.
