= Vazov (crater) =

Crater on Mercury

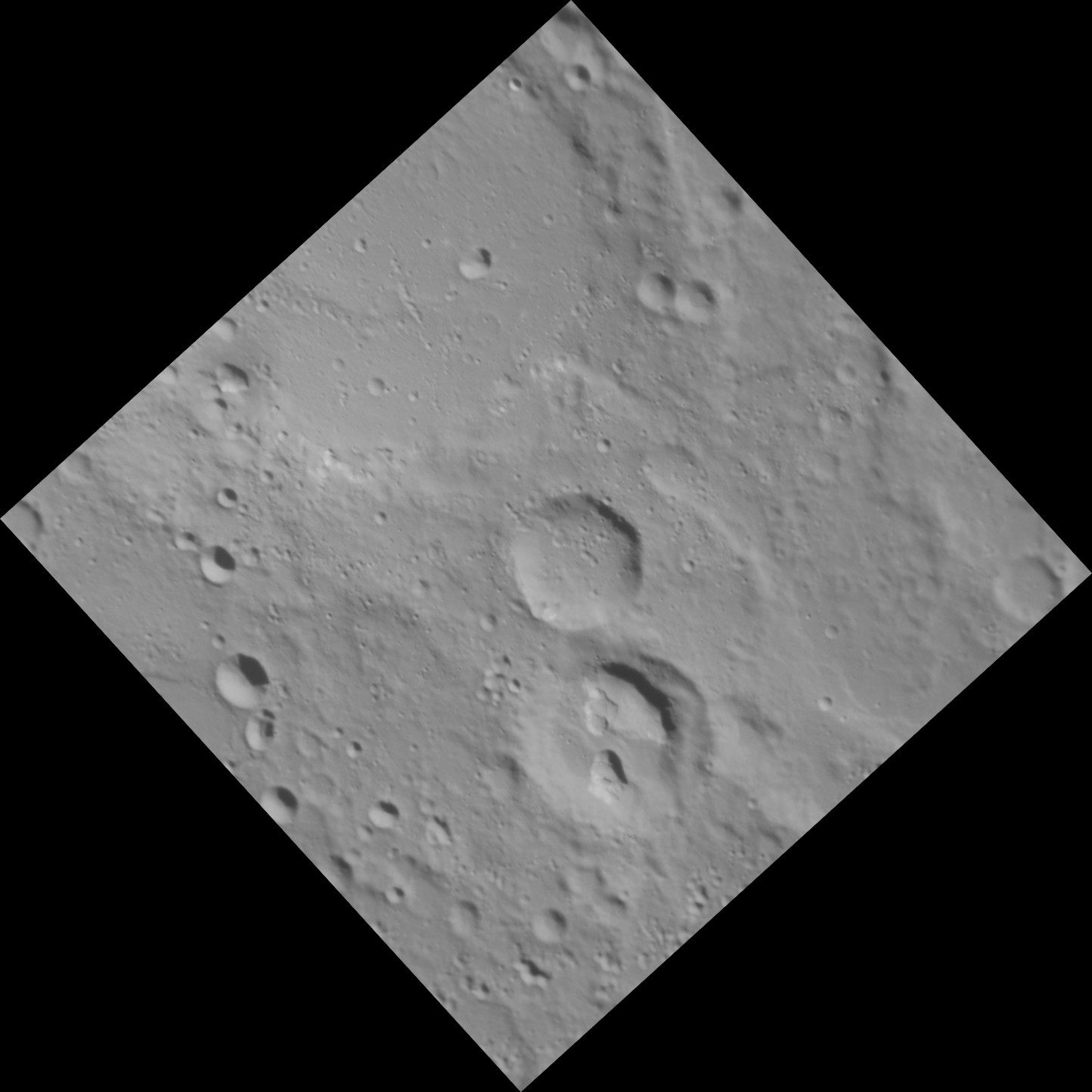
- MESSENGER NAC with Vazov below center
- Planet: Mercury
- Coordinates: 65.4°S 212.33°W
- Quadrangle: Neruda
- Diameter: 33.0 km (20.5 mi)
- Eponym: Ivan Vazov

Vazov is a crater on Mercury. Its name was adopted by the International Astronomical Union (IAU) in 2020. The crater is named for Bulgarian poet Ivan Vazov.

There are two irregular depressions in the crater floor, which may be volcanic vents.

The scarps of Altair Rupes are to the southeast of Vazov crater, as is the crater Codesido.
