= Mara Belcheva =

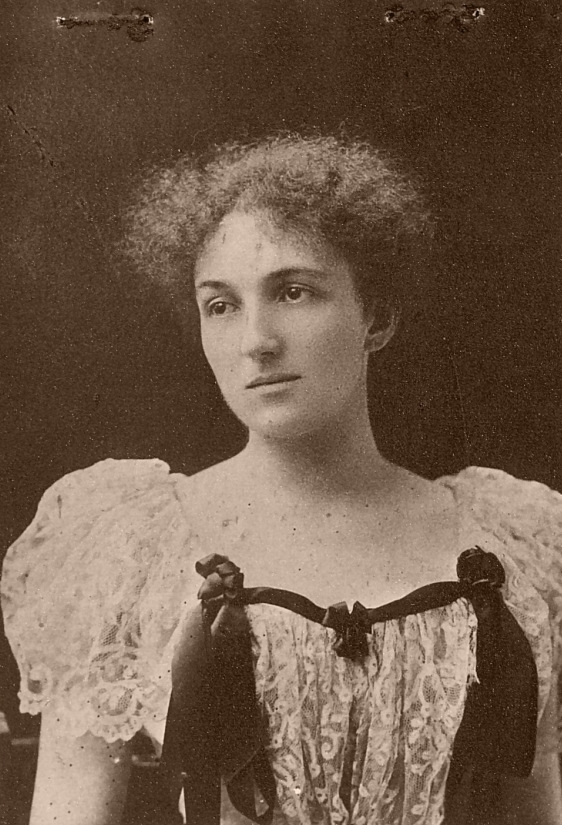
- Born: 8 September 1868; Sevlievo (Ottoman Empire)
- Died: 16 March 1937
- Occupations: Poet, writer, translator

Mara Belcheva (in bulgarian: Мара Иванова Белчева) (8 September 1868 – 16 March 1937) was a Bulgarian poet.

== Life ==
Mara Belcheva was born on September the 8th, 1968, in Sevlievo, Bulgaria. Her father was a leader of the April uprising against the Ottoman Empire.

She graduated from secondary school in Veliko Tarnovo and went on to study at a women's school in Vienna from 1883 to 1885.

She comes back in Bulgaria due to the death of her father and became a teacher in Ruse and Sofia.

In 1886, she married Hristo Belčev, poet and economist who served as minister of finance under Prime Minister Stefan Stambolov. An assassination attempt on Stambolov claimed the life of Belčev in 1891. (Stambolov himself was successfully assassinated in 1895.) Mara Belcheva was widowed at just 23 years old.

She briefly served as a lady-in-waiting at Tsar Ferdinand's palace, where she taught several languages to the prince's children. Tsar Ferdinand I was taken with Belcheva and kept a marble sculpture of her hand on his desk. He wished her to serve as lady-in-waiting to his mother, Clémentine of Orléans, but she refused a life in the palace.

In 1896, Mara Belcheva went back to Vienna to study philology.

In 1903 she began a relationship with poet Pencho Slaveykov which lasted until his death in 1912. They never married but referred to her as his "wife" throughout his writings.

During the Balkan War in 1913, she served as a teacher and nurse. After a stay in Geneva, she returned to Bulgaria, where she dedicated herself to writing, publishing, and translation.

She lived in Sofia until her death on March 16, 1937.

Her life and work left a significant mark on early 20th-century Bulgarian culture.

Mara Belcheva's house, located at 12 Hristo Belchev Street in Sofia, is one of the most remarkable examples of Art Nouveau architecture in Bulgaria.

== Literary Career ==
Belcheva was a poet and translator with broad cultural interests, fluent in several languages. She translated works by Friedrich Nietzsche, such as Thus Spoke Zarathustra (1915), and by Gerhart Hauptmann, including The Sunken Bell (performed in 1922), among others. She also published a biography of Slaveykov in 1925.

She began publishing poems in 1907 and released three poetry collections: Na praga stŭpki (Steps on the Threshold, 1918), Soneti (Sonnets, 1926), and Izbrani pesni (Selected Songs, 1931). Though her body of work is relatively small in volume, it remains unique in the history of Bulgarian "feminine" poetry. Spiritually enriched by her relationship with Slaveykov, Belcheva created intimate poetry devoted to delicate emotions and profound reflections. Her works focus on human closeness and trust. The central figure in her poems is a man worthy of enduring attachment, respect, and selfless love. The memory of this man illuminates her poetry, emphasizing her belief in the inexhaustible and timeless nature of spiritual bonds.

The confessional tone of her early poems gradually evolved into a reflection on eternal human questions. The poetess evoked Christian virtues, drawing strength from them, with the thought of God becoming a central theme in her works. Her poetry is characterized by deep morality, a calm, dreamy, and nostalgic sense of love, and a quest for harmony in existence.

Belcheva also served as editor of The Selected Works of Pencho Slaveykov (1923).

== Honors ==
- Mara Belcheva and Pencho Slaveykov appear on the 50 lev banknote. Belcheva is the second named woman to appear on Bulgarian paper currency.
- A street in Sofia, in the Triouguelnika-Nadezhda neighborhood, is named after Mara Belcheva.
