= Evgenia Mars =

Bulgarian writer

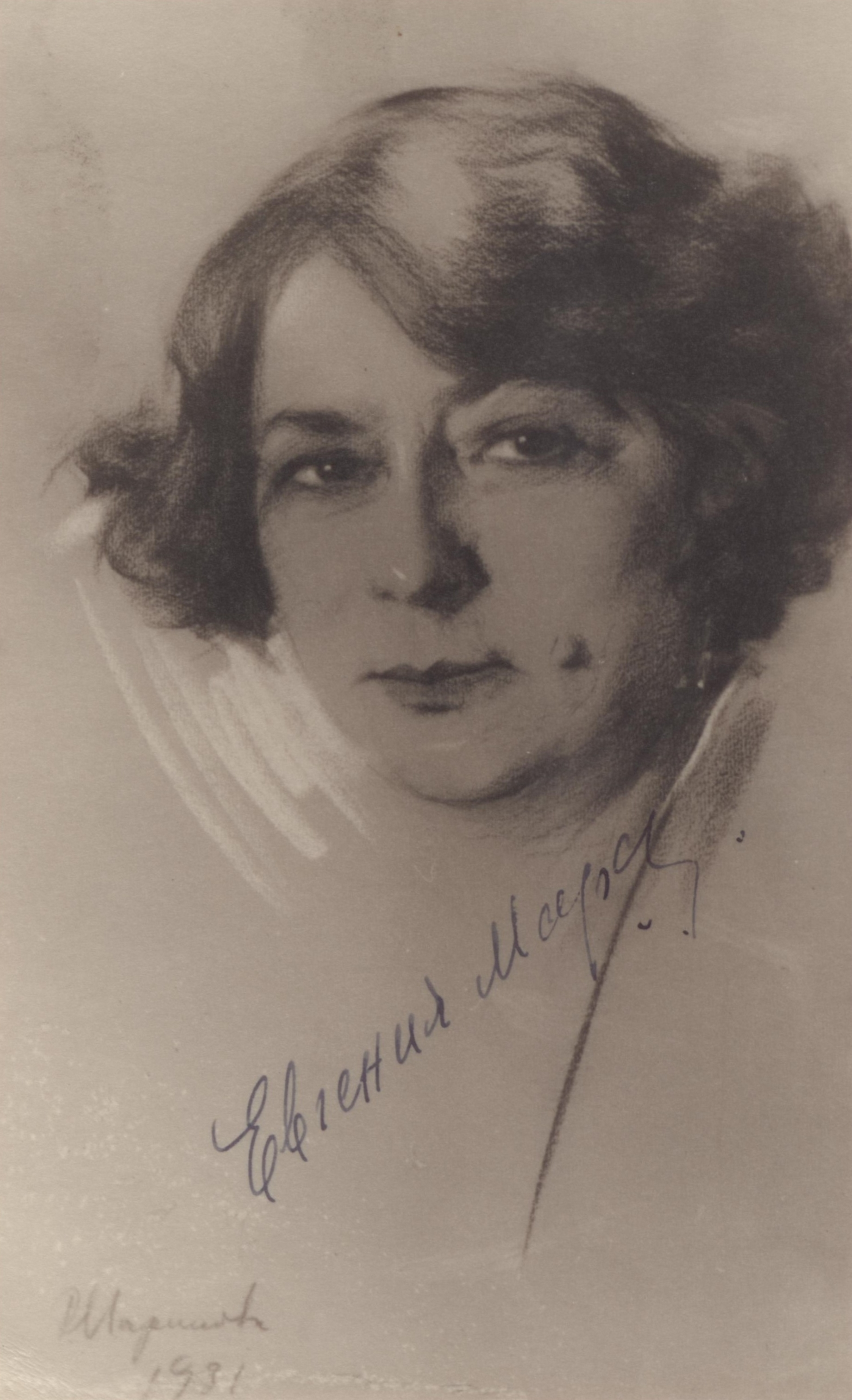
- Portrait of Evgenia Mars with an autograph
- Born: Evgenia Boncheva; 25 August 1877; Samokov, Ottoman Empire
- Died: 26 September 1945 (aged 68); Sofia, Bulgaria
- Other names: Evgenia Mars
- Years active: 1906–1935
- Spouse: Mihail Elmazov
- Partner: Ivan Vazov
- Family: Pavel Elmazov

Evgenia Boncheva (Bulgarian: Евгения Павлова Бончева; 1877–1945) or better known as Evgenia Mars (Bulgarian: Евгения Марс) was a Bulgarian writer, translator and community pioneer.

== Biography ==
Evgenia Mars was born under the name of Evgenia Boncheva on 25 August 1877 in the family of a trader and a teacher.

When she was 16 years old she married the prominent dentist Mihail Elmazov in Sofia. At the time she was studying in the girl school in Sofia. They have two sons. In 1885 she met Ivan Vazov. Afterward, she became famous among aristocrats and the public as Ivan Vazov's mistress.

After their meeting, Ivan Vazov started visiting the literary gatherings at their home each Thursday. He devoted over 70 poems to her. In the 50th anniversary of Ivan Vazov's work, he received a laurel wreath of silver and a silver harp with golden strings. He gave both of them to Evgenia Mars, which she later sold after his death for over 500,000 lev.

During the years, her relationship with Ivan Vazov greatly influenced the public's opinion on her literary work and achievements for the worse.

She suffered from cardiovascular issues and died on 26 April 1945.

== Literary works ==
During her lifetime, Evgenia Mars writes over 80 stories, 3 dramas, 2 of which were played in the Ivan Vazov National Theater. In 1927, she was chosen to lead the Union of Bulgarian women in art and culture as a chairwoman. Among her works, there are poems, collections of short stories, theater dramas, and encyclopedic almanacs. The most famous of which are:

- „Iz Zhivota“ 1906
- „Lunna Nosht“ 1909
- „Bozhana“ 1912
- „Magda“ 1918
- „Belite Nartsisi“ 1924
- „Poluvekovna Bulgaria“ 1929
- „Chovekut v Dripi“ 1935
