= 24 SU "P.K. Yavorov" =

Coordinates: 42°42′22″N 23°21′12″E

- 24 СУ „П. К. Яворов”

Location
- 16 Klisura Str. Sofia, Bulgaria, 1510

Information
- Type: High school
- Established: 1930

24 SU "P.K. Yavorov" (Bulgarian: 24 СУ „Пейо Крачолов Яворов“) is a gymnasium in Sofia, Bulgaria.

The school carries the name of the famous Bulgarian poet Peyo Yavorov. It was established in 1930. In 1969, it joined the 23rd Gymnasium “Poduene”, but later restored to a separate gymnasium again. Currently the school occupies its original building, built in accordance with the architectural standards of the early 20th century.

Many famous people have graduated from this school. Some of them are Yan Georgiev (actor); Georgi Ljubenov (journalist), Borislav Mihajlov and Pavel Vidanov (football players), Momchil Davidov (lecturer in the Sofia MVR Academy, writer, poet, composer, artist, and an expert in the area of internal security and public order).
