= Svetoslav Slavchev =

Bulgarian writer (1926–2016)

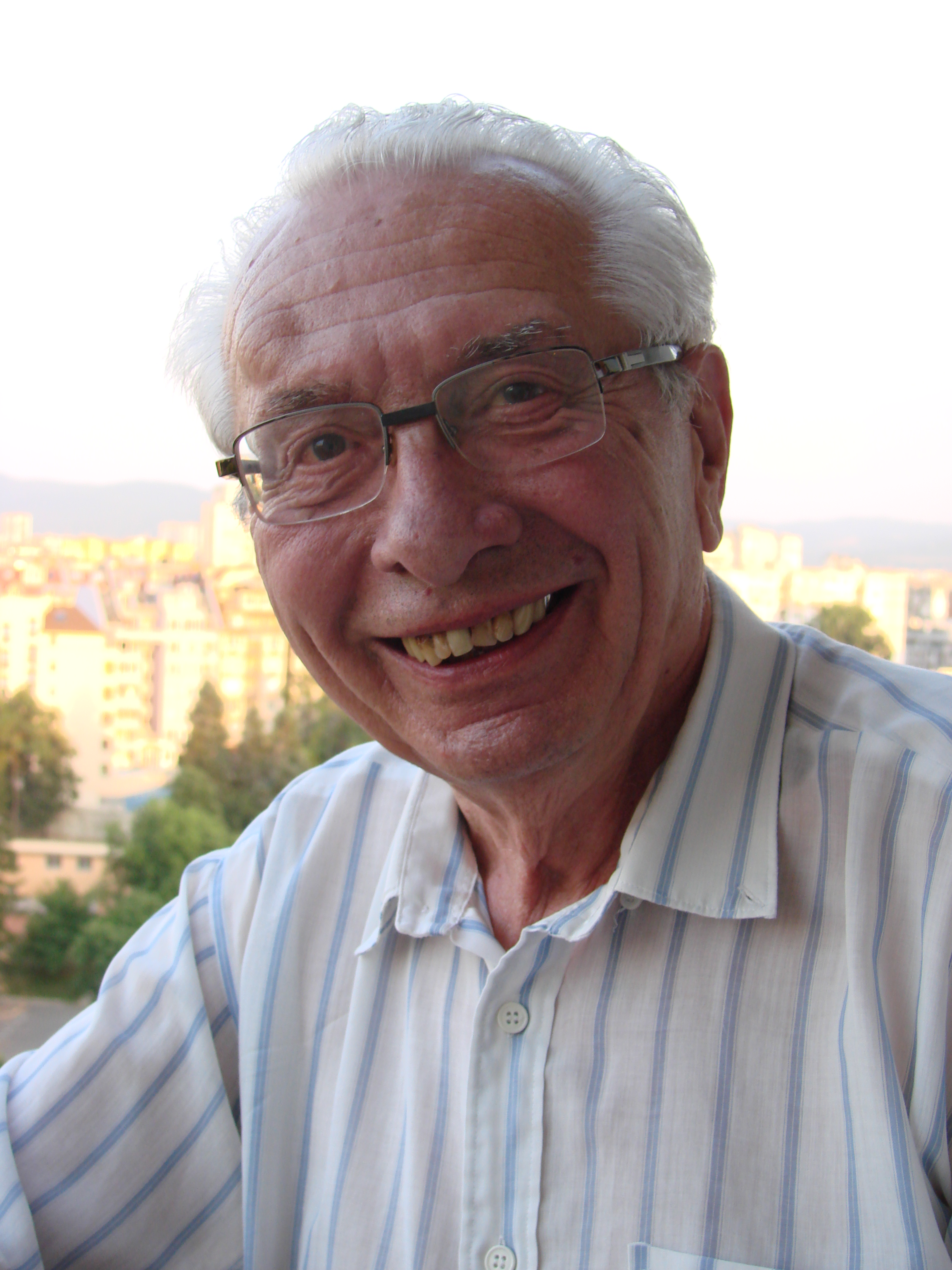
Svetoslav Slavchev

Svetoslav Donchev Slavchev (December 18, 1926, Lukovit – November 13, 2016, Sofia) was a popular Bulgarian science fiction and mystery writer, famous also as a journalist. His best known science fiction works include the short novel The Fortress of the Immortal ("Kreposta na bezsmartnite", 1970) and the short story collections A Trail for Vega-Orion ("Sleda kam Vega-Orion", 1979) and A Sword with Rubbies ("Shpaga s rubini", 1988). His most famous crime novels are: Nine, the Number of the Cobra ("Devet, chisloto na kobrata", 1977) and The Name of Death is Centaur ("Smartta se naricha kentavar", 1984). As the second editor of the widely read magazine Cosmos he invented and started publishing the riddle-like stories of the now famous police inspector Strezov. In the last years of his life he concentrated on this genre (resembling crime puzzle or logic puzzle but with a strong literary taste), as well as on this personage and there were two anthologies of his stories about Strezov published respectively in 2002 and 2010. His books are translated into Russian, German, Czech, Polish, Japanese etc. His awards include the prestigious Bulgarian national science fiction prize Graviton (2000) for his whole contribution to the genre. In 2018, an anthology of the best stories with inspector Strezov was published to commemorate the 50th anniversary from the character's creation, this time with the illustrations of the author's friend Alexander Vachkov.
