= Kristin Dimitrova =

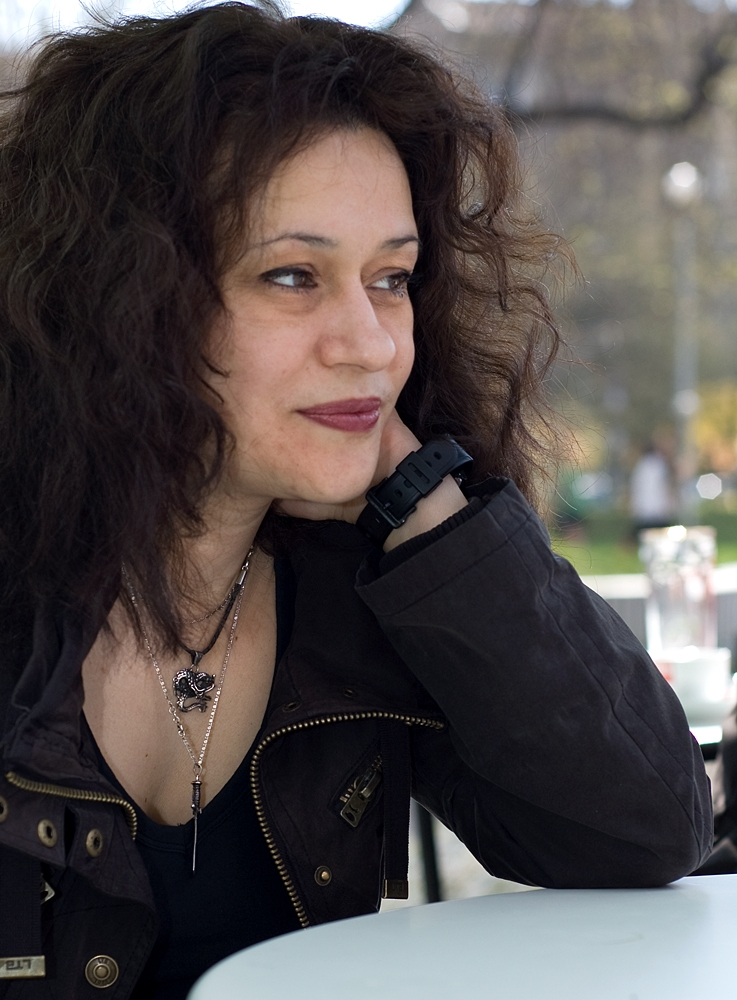
Kristin Dimitrova

Kristin Dimitrova, (Bulgarian: Кристин Димитрова) a Bulgarian writer and poet, was born in Sofia on May 19, 1963. Graduated in English and American Studies from the Sofia University, she now works there at the Department of Foreign Languages. From 2004 to 2006, she was editor of Art Trud, the weekly supplement for arts and culture of the Trud Daily, and in 2007-2008 was a columnist for Klasa Daily Since 2008 she has been a regular participant on the Darik Radio Friday talk show The Big Jury.

Kristin Dimitrova is a winner of five national awards for poetry, three for prose and one for the translation of John Donne's poetry into Bulgarian. Translations of Dimitrova's poems, short stories and essays have been published in anthologies and periodicals in 35 countries, including Austria, Belarus, Bosnia and Herzegovina, Canada, China, Croatia, Czech Republic, France, Germany, Hungary, Iceland, Ireland, Italy, Lithuania, Macedonia, Mexico, the Netherlands, Romania, Russia, Slovenia, Serbia, Poland, Sweden, Turkey, the United Kingdom and the United States.

== Bibliography ==
Kristin Dimitrova is the author of the following books:

Poetry

- Jacob’s Thirteenth Child (1992), Svobodno Poetichesko Obshtestvo, Sofia;
- A Face Under the Ice, (1997), Svobodno Poetichesko Obshtestvo, Sofia;
- Closed Figures (1998), Ab Publishers, Sofia;
- Faces with Twisted Tongues (1998), Literaturen Forum, Sofia;
- Talisman Repairs (2001), PAN Publishing House, Sofia;
- Kristin Dimitrova: Selected Poems in Greek, Bulgarian and English, (2002), (transl. into Greek by Panos Stathoyannis), Soros Center for Arts, Sofia;
- The People with the Lanterns (2003), Janet 45 Publishers, Plovdiv;
- A Visit to the Clockmaker (2005), (transl. into English by Gregory O’Donoghue), Southword Editions, Cork, Ireland.
- The Cardplayer’s Morning (2008), Janet 45 Publishers, Plovdiv;
- My Life in Squares (Smokestack Books, UK, 2010)

Fiction

- Tarot: the Doors Within (2001), LIK Publishing House, Sofia;
- Love and Death under the Crooked Pear Trees (2004), short stories, Obsidian Ltd., Sofia.
- Sabazius (2007), a novel, Ink (Locus Publishing Ltd.), Sofia.
- The Secret Way of the Ink (2010), short stories, Obsidian Ltd., Sofia.

Screenplays

- The Goat (2006) (Kozelat), written in co-authorship with film director Georgi Dulgerov. The film was released in 2009.

Translations into Bulgarian

- The Anagram (1999), a selection of John Donne's poetry, Obsidian Ltd., Sofia.
