= Abagar =

1651 book by Filip Stanislavov

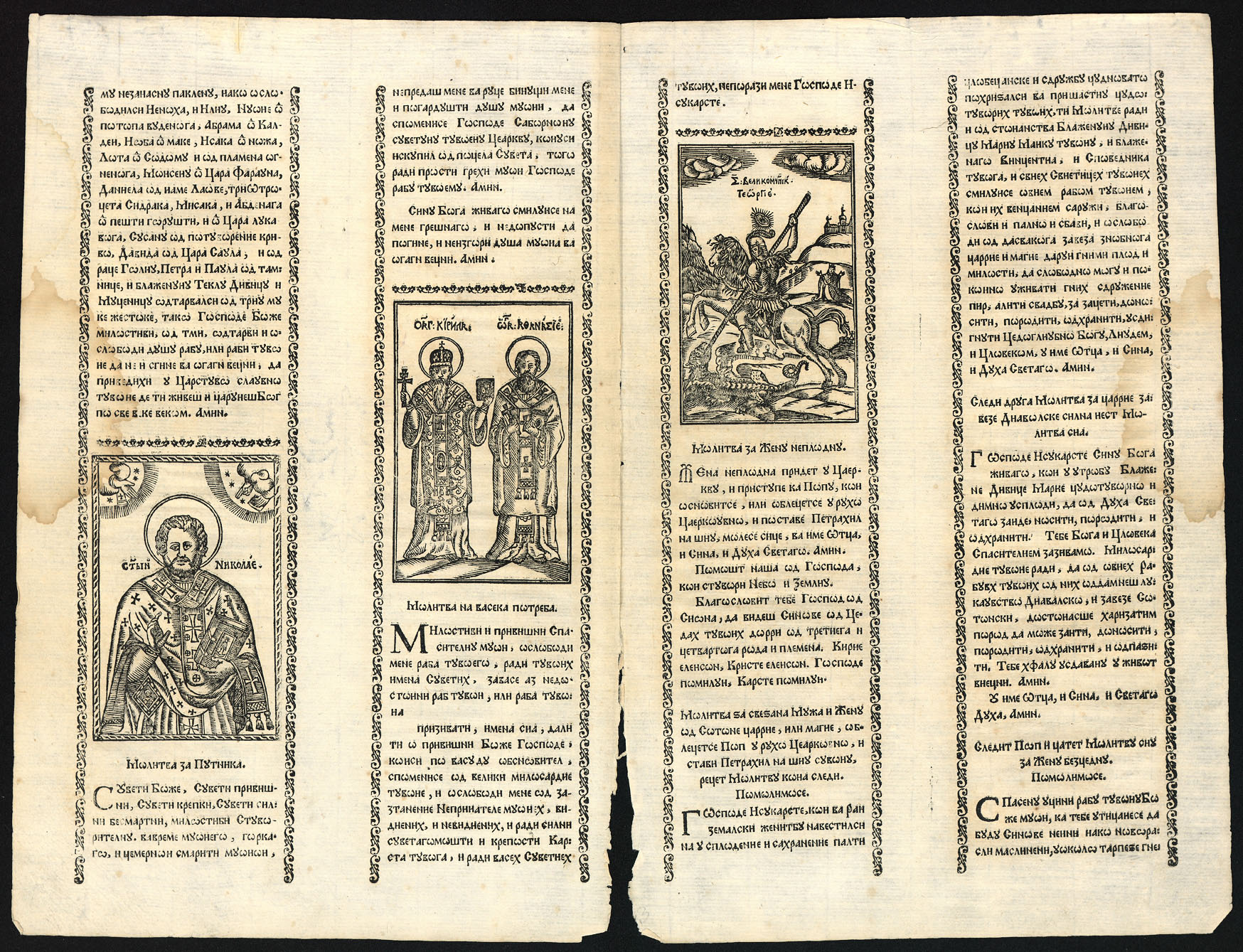
One of the pages of Abagar, preserved in the SS. Cyril and Methodius National Library in Sofia

Abagar ("Абагар") is a breviary by the Bulgarian Roman Catholic Bishop of Nikopol Filip Stanislavov printed in Rome in 1651. It is regarded as the first printed book in modern Bulgarian. The language of the breviary is a specific blend of modern Bulgarian and Church Slavonic with Serbian Cyrillic influences, that was used in writing by the Catholics from Chiprovtsi, Bulgaria, in the period. Unlike many other works of the Bulgarian Roman Catholics, it was printed in Cyrillic and not Latin.

== Naming and reference to Abgar V of Edessa ==
The book is named after the apocryphal message of King Abgar to Jesus that was included. A total of six copies of the book are preserved, only one of which in Bulgaria, housed in the SS. Cyril and Methodius National Library in Sofia.

== Publication history ==
The first phototype issue of the book was published in 1905 by the Russian Kuzinsky. The first Bulgarian one followed in 1926 by Vasil Pundev and the one by Bozhidar Raykov was printed in 1979. It was not until 2001 that an edition translated to standard modern Bulgarian (by Kiril Kabakchiev) was published.
