= Peyo Yavorov =

Bulgarian poet (1878–1914)

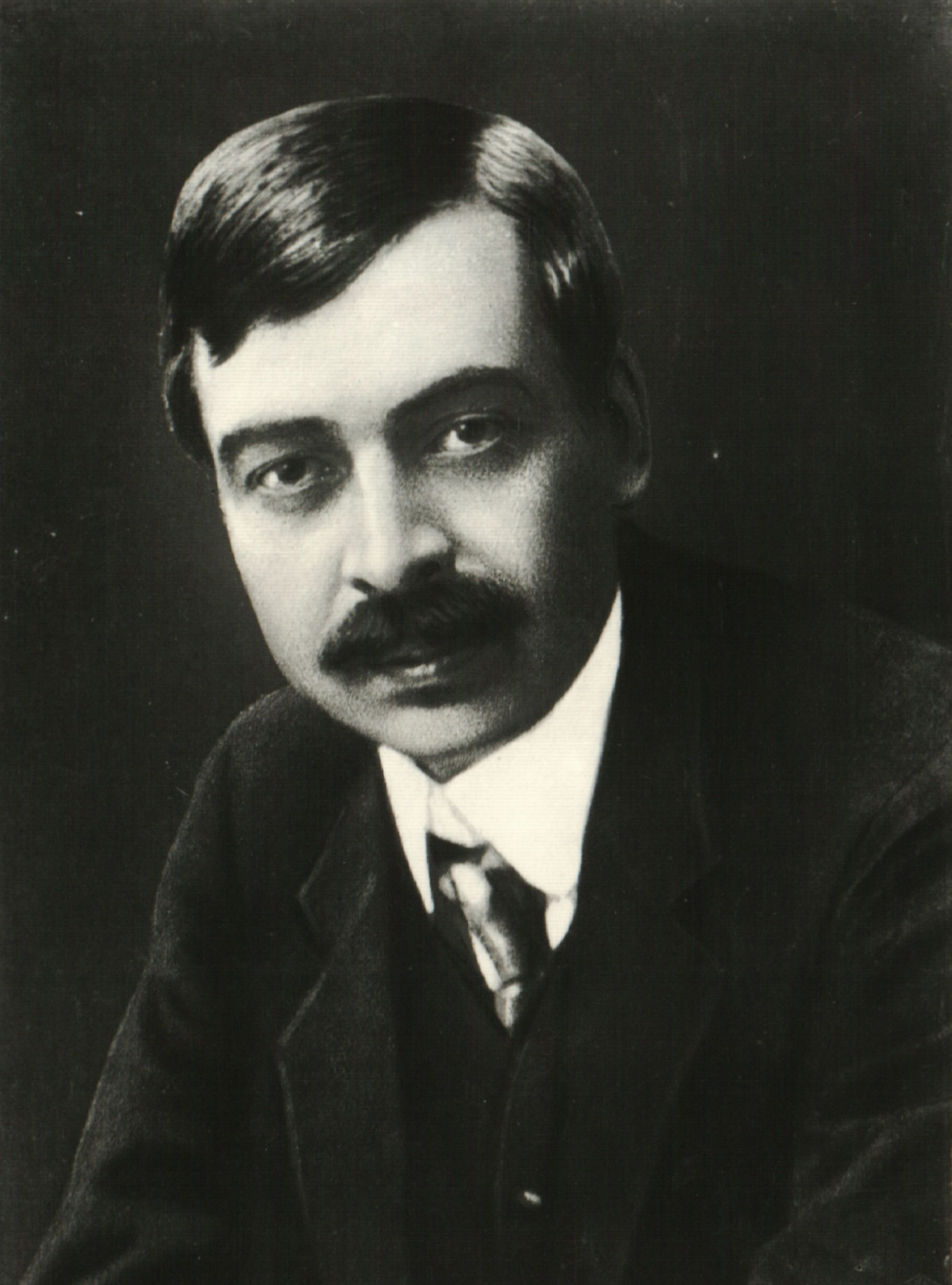
- Born: 1 January 1878 Chirpan, Ottoman Empire
- Died: 29 October 1914 (aged 36) Sofia, Kingdom of Bulgaria
- Occupation: Writer
- Genre: Lyric
- Spouse: Lora Karavelova

Peyo Yavorov (Bulgarian: Пейо (Кр.) Яворов; born Peyo Totev Kracholov, Пейо Тотев Крачолов; 13 January 1878 – 29 October 1914) was a Bulgarian symbolist poet. He was considered to be one of the finest poetic talents in the fin de siècle Kingdom of Bulgaria. Yavorov was a prominent member of the "Misal" ("Мисъл") literary and cultural group. His life and work are closely connected with the liberation movement Internal Macedonian-Adrianople Revolutionary Organization in Macedonia. He was also a supporter of the Armenian Independence Movement, and wrote a number of poems about Armenians.

Most of his poems are romantic in subject, and dedicated to the two women in his life – Mina Todorova and Lora Karavelova. His first (and arguably greatest) love Mina died from tuberculosis, which greatly saddened Yavorov. She was buried in the cemetery of Boulogne Billancourt.

Later on he met Lora, the daughter of statesman Petko Karavelov. They were married, and the correspondence between them was considered evidence of their ardent and vivid love, and thus different from the relationship Yavorov had with Mina Todorova. In 1913, Lora shot herself and Yavorov tried to commit suicide. The bullet went through his temporal bone, which left him blind. In despair over the trial provoked by Lora's death and the rumor that he had killed her, Yavorov poisoned and then shot himself in autumn 1914, at the age of 36.

== Honours ==
Yavorov Peak on Livingston Island in the South Shetland Islands, Antarctica is named after Peyo Yavorov. In addition, a number of elementary (primary), middle and high (secondary) schools across Bulgaria also bear his name (e.g. the Peyo Kr. Yavorov Middle/High School in Plovdiv).

An elementary school in Yerevan, Armenia is named after Peyo Yavorov.

== Gallery ==
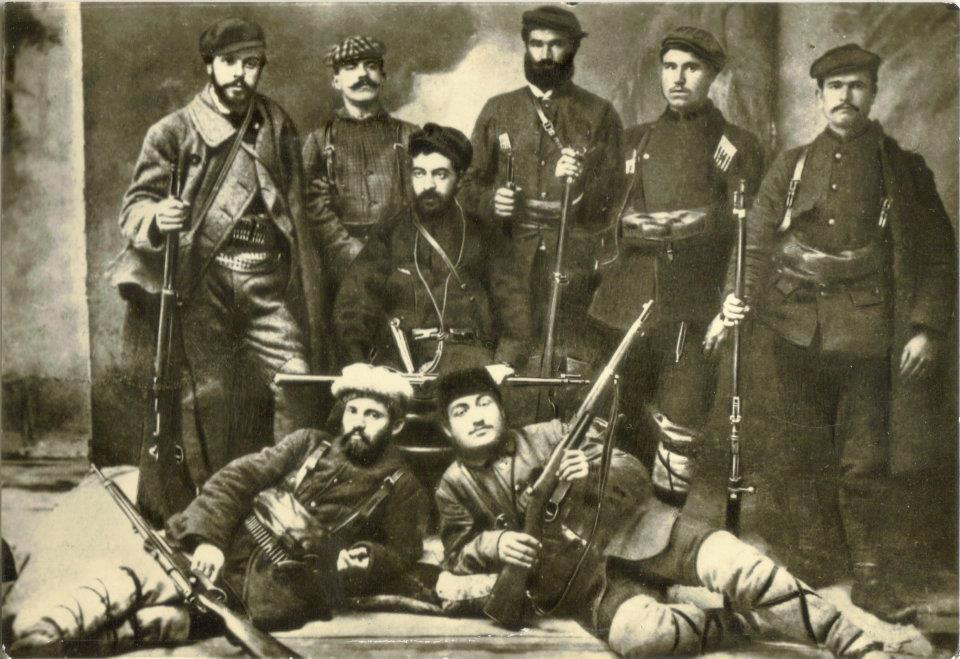
Guerilla detachment #15 of the Macedonian-Adrianople militia, seated above is the poet Peyo Yavorov.

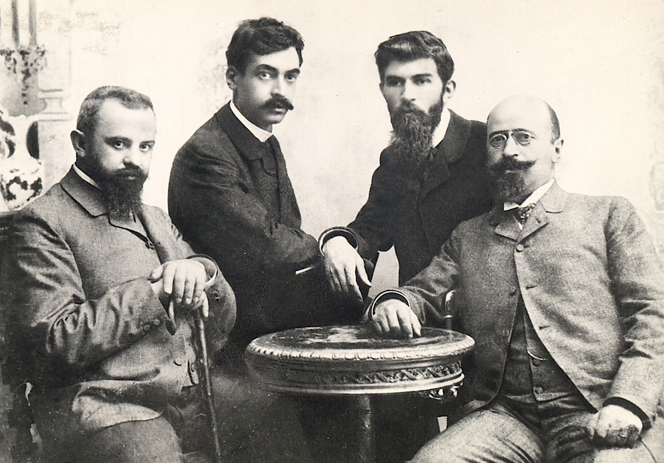
From left to right, Pencho Slaveykov, Peyo Yavorov, Petko Todorov, and Krastyo Krastev

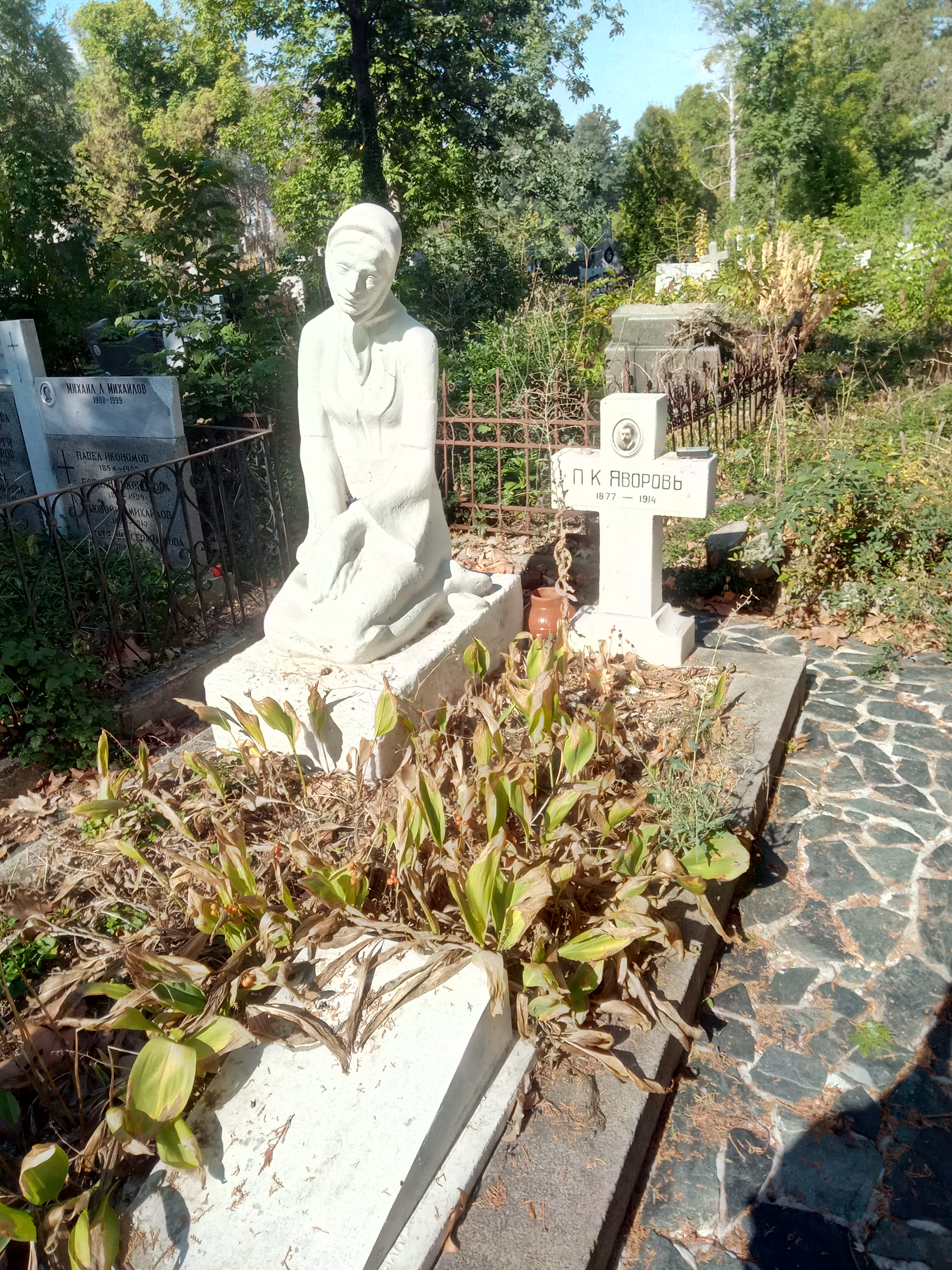
The grave of Peyo Yavorov at Sofia Central Cemetery (42°42′48.3″N 023°19′58.4″E)

== See also ==
- 24 SOU "P.K. Yavorov"
