= Pencho Slaveykov =

Bulgarian poet (1866–1912)

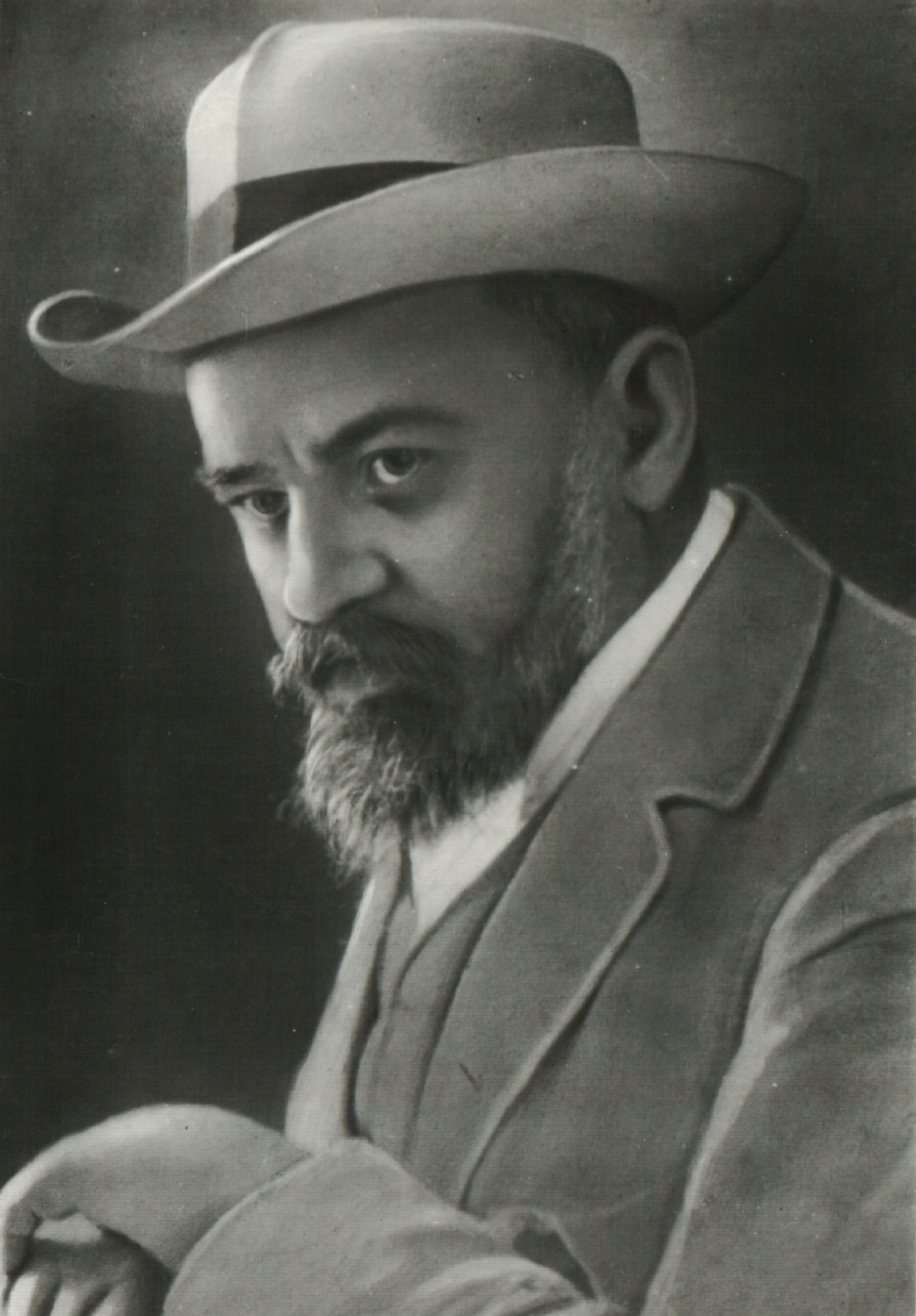
- Born: 27 April 1866 Tryavna, Ottoman Empire
- Died: 28 May 1912 (aged 46) Brunate, Italy
- Resting place: Central Sofia Cemetery; 42°42′47.6″N 023°20′02.2″E
- Genre: Poem, Essay
- Partner: Mara Belcheva
- Parents: Petko Slaveykov

Pencho Petkov Slaveykov (Bulgarian: Пенчо Петков Славейков) (27 April 1866 O.S. – 10 June 1912 (O.S. 28 May 1912)) was a noted Bulgarian poet and one of the participants in the Misal ("Thought") circle. He was the youngest son of the writer Petko Slaveykov.

== Biography ==
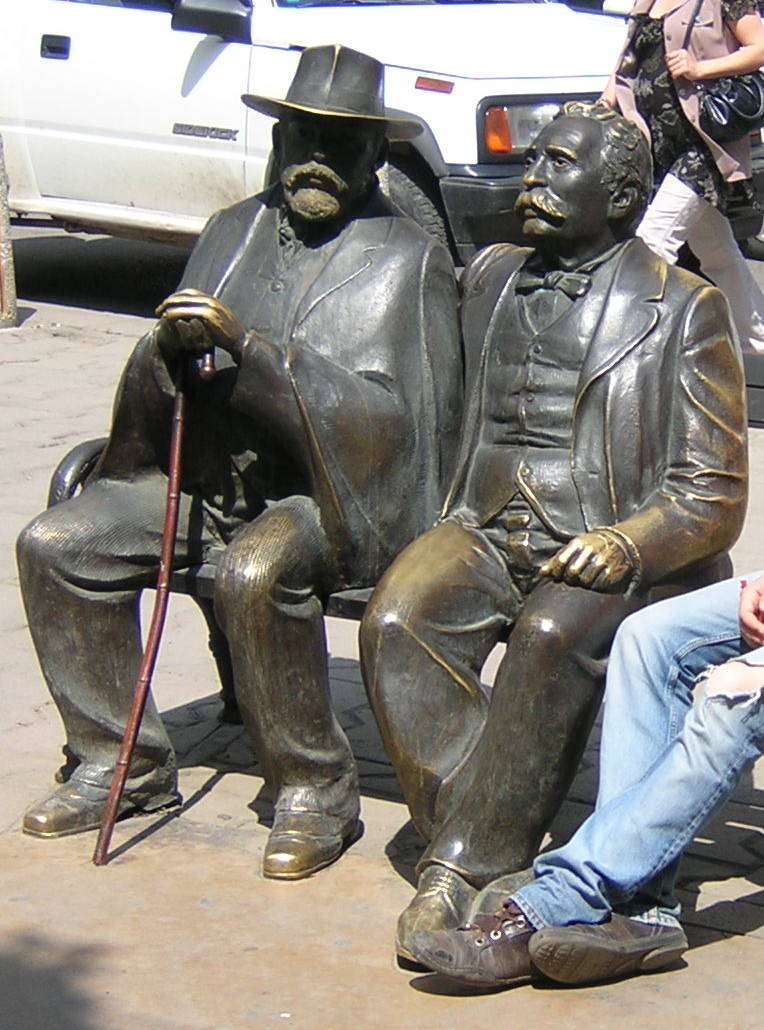
Pencho Slaveykov (left sculpture) and his father Petko (right sculpture) as immortalized on Slaveykov Square in Sofia.

Born in Tryavna during the Bulgarian National Revival under Ottoman rule, Pencho was educated there and in Stara Zagora and Plovdiv.

In January 1884 he fell asleep on a bench while it was snowing and developed pneumonia. Despite lengthy treatment in Plovdiv, Sofia, Leipzig, Berlin and Paris, this left him with serious impairments – he could not walk without a cane, and he wrote and spoke with difficulties. He suffered from melancholic episodes, which forced him to find a cure in literature and to harden his will.

Slaveykov's works include poems and intimate lyrics. He collaborated with a number of magazines, which issued his works, and spent a part of his life in Leipzig studying philosophy, where he became familiar with German literature, thought and art.

After returning to Bulgaria in 1898, Slaveykov joined the Misal circle with a number of other noted writers, such as Krastyo Krastev, Petko Todorov and Peyo Yavorov. He became an assistant director (1901–1909) and later director of the National Library of Bulgaria (1909–1911) and a director of the Bulgarian National Theatre (1908–1909).

In 1903 he began a relationship with the poet Mara Belcheva which lasted until his death in 1912. They never married but he referred to her as his "wife" throughout his writings.

He was sent on missions to Moscow (1909) and Istanbul, Athens, Naples, Sorrento, and Rome (1911), where he studied the development of the libraries. Upon returning he engaged in hectic work.

He was fired from the post of director of the National Library because of political misunderstandings with the minister of culture Stefan Bobchev on 10 July 1911, and left Bulgaria, living in Zürich, Lucerne, Göschenen, Andermatt, Lugano and other places in Switzerland before arriving in Italy in the end of November 1911. He remained in Rome for three months, but set off in May 1912 to travel through Florence, the Engadin and the mountains looking for a cure. At the end of the month, he arrived in the small town of Brunate near Lake Como, where he died on 10 June 1912.

Slaveykov was buried in Brunate's cemetery and his remains were moved to Bulgaria in 1921. Due to his death, the suggestion by Swedish professor Al. Jensen that Slaveykov be awarded a Nobel Prize was not considered by the Nobel Prize committee.

Slaveykov and Belcheva are portrayed on the Bulgarian 50 levs banknote, issued in 1999 and 2006.

== See also ==
- "Do you give Balkandzhi Yovo, nice Yana to the Turkish faith?", a folk song reworked by Slaveykov
