= Milev =

Milev (Bulgarian: Милев) is a Bulgarian masculine surname, its feminine counterpart is Mileva. It may refer to

- Dmitrii Milev (1887–1937), Soviet Moldovan writer and politician
- Emil Milev (born 1964), Bulgarian sport shooter
- Geo Milev (1895–c.1925), Bulgarian poet, journalist, and translator
  - Milev Rocks in Antarctica, named after Geo Milev
- Ivan Milev (1897–1927), Bulgarian painter
- Krum Milev (1915–2000), Bulgarian football player and manager
- Leda Mileva (1920–2013), Bulgarian writer, translator and diplomat, daughter of Geo
- Milena Mileva Blažić (born 1956), Slovenian literary historian
- Nasko Milev (born 1996), Bulgarian football player
- Nikola Milev (1881–1925), Bulgarian historian, publicist and diplomat
- Ralitsa Mileva (born 1993), Bulgarian artistic gymnast
- Yana Milev, German artist, philosopher, author and sociologist
- Zdravko Milev (1929–1984), Bulgarian chess player
