= Hristo Yasenov =

Bulgarian poet and journalist (1889–1925)

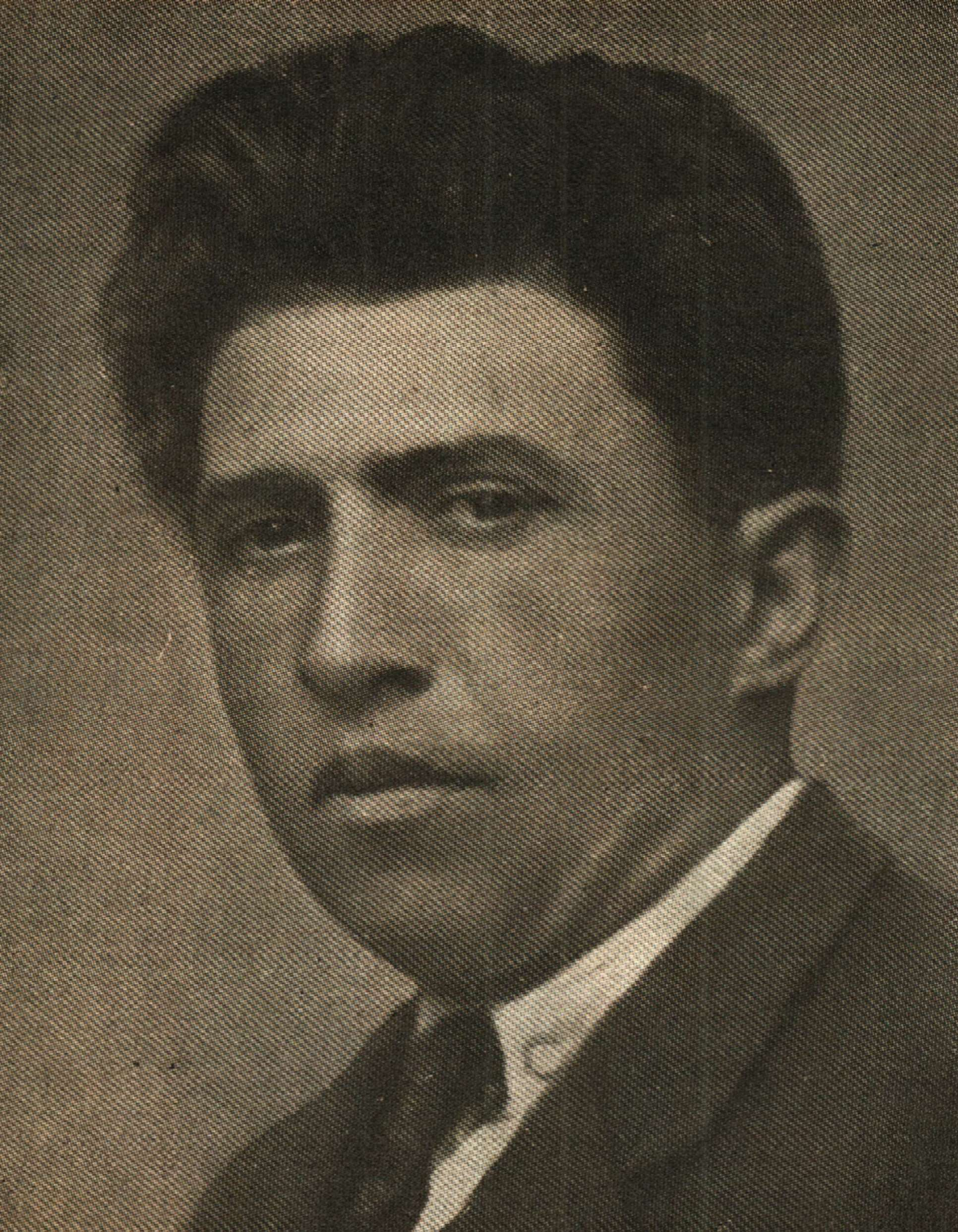
- Born: Hristo Pavlov Tudzharov; December 24, 1889; Etropole, Principality of Bulgaria
- Died: April 1925 (aged 35); Kingdom of Bulgaria
- Occupations: Poet, satirist, journalist

Hristo Yasenov (born Hristo Pavlov Tudzharov; 24 December 1889 – April 1925) was a Bulgarian poet, journalist and communist activist.

== Biography ==
He was born in Etropole, where he attended primary school. He then studied at the Koprivshtitsa Gymnasium and the Svishtov Trade School He eventually graduated from high school in Vratsa in 1907. From an early age, he displayed artistic talent, drawing and writing poetry that was published in school magazines.

In 1907, he began studying at an art school in Sofia. Under the influence of Anton Strashimirov, whom he met in 1909, he began collaborating with the literary magazine "Nasz Zhivot." Strashimirov authored the pseudonym (Yasenov), under which the young writer became known in literary circles. It was also during this time that Yasenov's works, written in the style of Symbolism, were composed. These were collected in a single volume of poems, titled "Ritzarski zamyk" (Richard's Lock), published in 1921.

He participated in the First and Second Wars. After returning to Sofia, he continued his studies at the Art Drawing School. In 1914, he entered the Reserve Officers' School in Knyazhevo, after which he was a senior non-commissioned officer in Orhaniye. Yasenov also participated in the First World War as a platoon commander in Serbia and on the Southern Front, and was promoted to the rank of lieutenant in 1917. After the Thessaloniki Armistice, Yassenov escaped from a prisoner of war camp in the village of Sekulovo, where he was held as a hostage. Influenced by the experience of the war, Yasenov wrote poetry in praise of the October Revolution and joined the Communist Party in 1919. He abandoned the concept of "art for art's sake" and turned to political satire. He published his columns in the leftist magazine "Cherven smyach," which he co-founded with Krum Kyulyavkov. It was during this time that he met and began collaborating with Hristo Smirnenski.

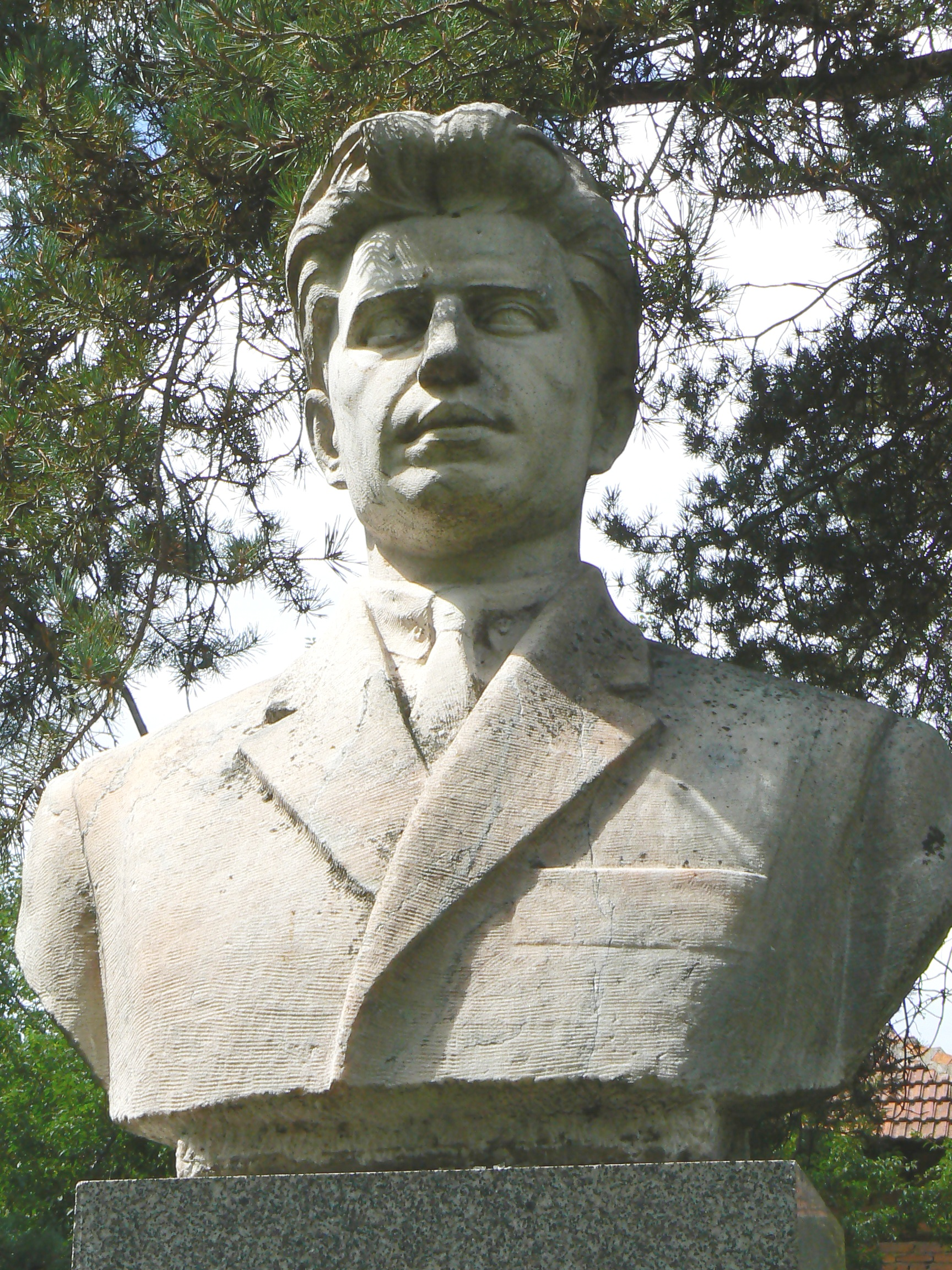
Monument to Hristo Yasenov in Etropole

As a member of the BKP, he took part in the September Uprising of 1923, and after its defeat, he was interned in the town of Gorna Dzhumaya in March 1924. Due to numerous protests from artistic circles, he was released in early April. Six days after the bombing of the Sveta Nedelya Church, Yasenov was arrested again. He disappeared without a trace and was most likely killed alongside other poets such as Geo Milev by the police under custody.
