= Gustav Heinse =

Gustav Heinse (Bulgarian: Густав Хайнзе), born Josef K. Klein (1896–1971), was a poet and translator who was mostly active in Bulgaria, where he lived and worked from 1924 until his death.

== Biography and work ==
Heinse was born in 1896 in Castelnuovo in the Habsburg monarchy's Kingdom of Dalmatia (today Herceg Novi in the Bay of Kotor, on the Adriatic coast of Montenegro). Heinse's father was an officer in the Austro–Hungarian Army of Bohemian German extraction, while his mother was an Italian. His father's career as an officer meant that Heinse as a first-born son was destined to a military education. He studied at the military schools in Sankt Pölten, Straß and Mährisch Weißkirchen (today Hranice in Přerov District) and graduated from the Theresian Military Academy in Wiener Neustadt.

As a newly promoted officer, in 1916 the 20-year-old Heinse was dispatched to the Italian Front of World War I. He served as part of the 43rd Infantry Regiment and fought at the Isonzo, taking part in the battle of Doberdò, San Martino del Carso and Monte San Michele. The horrors of war shaped Heinse as a pacifist, and it was at the time (1916–1917) that he published his first poems. He would send his poetic works, complemented by articles, to newspapers in the Banat that would publish them. Major influences on the developing writer were Hermann Hesse, Rabindranath Tagore, Romain Rolland and later Rainer Maria Rilke, whom he also met in person. Heinse's earliest works authored during World War I were later republished by the independent Viennese literary magazine Das Tage-Buch. Years later, in 1937, he would publish these in Sofia in a book of poetry titled Der brennende Berg (“The Burning Mountain”).

In 1924, Gustav Heinse arrived in Sofia, the capital of the Kingdom of Bulgaria, as a factory engineer for German company Siemens & Halske's Vienna branch. Heinse married and settled down in Bulgaria. The 1930s and 1940s were Heinse's most productive period as a poetry writer. They saw the release of the books Der brennende Berg (1937), an autobiographical account of Heinse's experiences on the Italian Front in his youth, and Der Garten ("The Garden", 1932), a collection of lyrical and love poetry.

He continued his interest in poetry, though he also assumed a new role as a translator of eminent Bulgarian writers and poets from Bulgarian to German. His anthology Bulgarische Gesänge ("Bulgarian Melodies"), issued in 1938, features German translations of poems by Hristo Botev, Pencho Slaveykov, Peyo Yavorov, Teodor Trayanov, Nikolay Liliev, Elisaveta Bagryana and Nikola Furnadzhiev. In 2006, the enlarged anthology was republished by Veliko Tarnovo publisher PIC; it includes German translations of Bulgarian poetry ranging from 19th-century Bulgarian National Revival champions Lyuben Karavelov and Ivan Vazov to modern authors Leda Mileva and Valeri Petrov.

While Heinse would continue to translate Bulgarian lyric poetry until the end of his life, he also worked on translations of prose works (e.g. tales by Yordan Yovkov and Angel Karaliychev). Some of his translations were published in German magazines like Westermanns Monatshefte, Die Literatur and Der Türmer or by the German-language Bulgarian press like Der Bulgarienwart, Bulgarische Wochenschau and Sofioter Nachrichten. In 1957, East Berlin-based publisher Volk und Welt released Heinse's translation of Dimitar Dimov's influential novel Tyutyun ("Tobacco"), signed by Heinse under his real name, Josef Klein. Heinse died in Sofia in 1971.

== Bibliography ==
- Der Garten. Ein Liederkranz (Sofia, 1932)
- Der brennende Berg (Sofia, 1937, 2nd ed. 1950)
- Bulgarische Gesänge (Sofia, 1938; 2nd ed. Veliko Tarnovo, 2006)
- Tabak (Berlin, 1957)
- Die Grille. Lyrik (Veliko Tarnovo, 1994)
