= Krum Kyulyavkov =

Bulgarian writer, politician and journalist

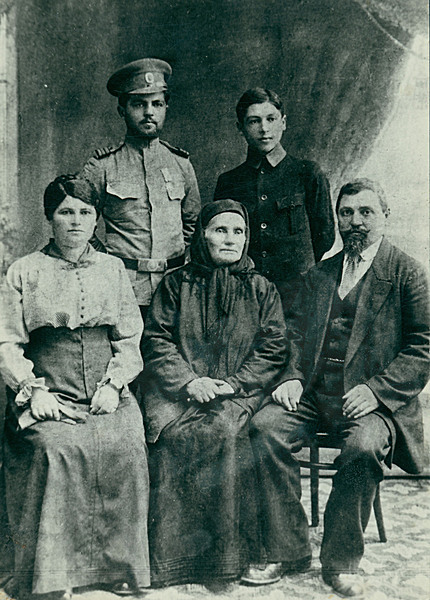
Krum Kyulyavkov (in military uniform) with his family

Krum Pavlov Kyulyavkov (Bulgarian: Крум Павлов Кюлявков; February 1893 – 18 December 1955) was a Bulgarian writer, poet, journalist and Communist Party official.

== Biography ==
Krum Kyulyavkov was born in Kyustendil, into the family of Pavel Kyulyavkov, a prominent activist of the Bulgarian community in Macedonia. He volunteered in the Balkan Wars and after experiencing the horrors of that war, he began to engage in revolutionary activities. After the First World War, in which he was wounded in battle, he joined the Bulgarian Social Democratic Workers' Party (Narrow Socialists), which was later named to the Bulgarian Communist Party (BCP).

Kyulyavkov was close to other Bulgarian left-wing writers such as Hristo Smirnenski and Hristo Yasenov and wrote for party newspapers and magazines. During the September Uprising in 1923, he created an armed student illegal group in the high school. After the suppression of the uprising, he was forced to flee to Sofia. Kyulyavkov traveled to Austria in 1926 by the order of the BCP and shortly after to the Soviet Union where mostly lived in Kharkiv. He translated works from Russian and Ukrainian and worked with communist writers Marko Marchevsky and Georgi Bakalov.

During the purges he was arrested in 1938 and lived under house arrest, until he was rehabilitated in 1940 with the help of Georgi Dimitrov in 1940 and managed to return to Bulgaria, where he became active in the underground communist resistance and was tasked with becoming the head of the BCP's writers' committee.

After the 1944 September coup, Kyulyavkov was involved in the suppression of literary and artistic opponents of the Communist Party in Bulgaria. In the same month, he was appointed editor-in-chief of the BCP's official newspaper, Rabotnichesko delo.

Kyulyavkov was the secretary of the Bulgarian delegation for the conclusion of the armistice in Moscow. He served as head of the Cultural Department at the Central Committee of the BCP from 1944 to 1947. He was an associate Professor and Rector of National Academy of Art 1950 to 1953.

He was a member of the Writers Union of Bulgaria and received various awards such as the Georgi Dimitrov Award and Honored Worker of Culture.

Kyulyavkov died in Sofia.
