= Dimitar Zlatarev =

Terrorist

- Born: 5 August 1896; Yambol, Principality of Bulgaria
- Died: 1937 (aged 40–41) Komsomolsk-on-Amur, USSR
- Branch: Military Organization of the Bulgarian Communist Party
- Known for: Perpetrating St. Nedelya Church bombing

Dimitar Vasiliev Zlatarev (Bulgarian: Димитър Василев Златарев; 5 August 1896 in Yambol, Principality of Bulgaria – 1937 in Komsomolsk-on-Amur, Soviet Union) was a Bulgarian terrorist. He joined the Bulgarian Communist Party at 1919, rising to become a high-ranking member of its armaments section. At 1924 he and Dimitar Hadzhidimitrov suggested a plot to assassinate a police director and detonate a bomb at his funeral, thus killing many people in the police hierarchy. This attack is what later became the St Nedelya Church assault. Zlatarev fled to the USSR and was sentenced to death in absentia. During the Great Purge he was sent to a labor camp, where he died.

== Biography ==
Dimitar Zlatarev was born on August 5, 1896 in the city of Yambol. He was a member of the Bulgarian Communist Party since 1919.

In 1919–1925, he was a member of the Sofia District Committee of the Bulgarian Communist Party. An active trade unionist and member of the Trade Union Committee of the Bulgarian Communist Party. He participated in the preparation of the 1923 September Uprising. In 1924, he was recruited to the leadership of the Military Organization of the Bulgarian Communist Party as the head of armaments.

Dimitar Zlatarev was one of the main organizers of the attack on the church of St. Nedelya, carried out on April 16, 1925. He was sentenced in absentia to death under the Criminal Code.

He emigrated to the USSR, where he took the name Fyodorov. He was accepted into the All-Union Communist Party. He graduated from a military-political school. He was a member of the Bauman District Committee of the All-Union Communist Party in Moscow. He worked in the political department of the railways in the city of Perm from 1936–1937. He was awarded the Order of the Red Banner.

During the Great Purge, he was declared a left-wing sectarian by Georgi Dimitrov and Vasil Kolarov and in 1937 he was arrested by the NKVD. He was killed in a Soviet concentration camp in 1937 or 1938. However, after the 1944 9 September Coup in Bulgaria and the establishment of a communist regime, the communists presented him as a victim of the anti-fascist struggle.
