= Ventseslav Konstantinov =

Bulgarian writer and translator (1940–2019)

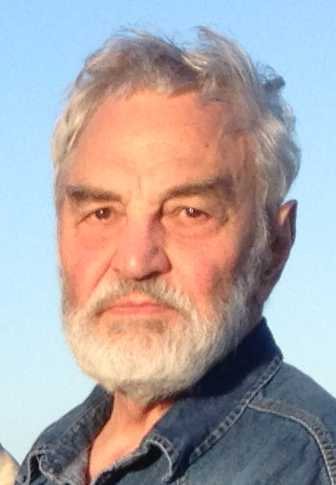
Ventseslav Konstantinov in 2014

Ventseslav Konstantinov (Bulgarian: Венцеслав Константинов) (September 14, 1940 – April 22, 2019) was a Bulgarian writer, aphorist and translator of German and English literature.

== Early life ==
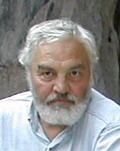
Konstantinov in 2004

Konstantinov was born in Sofia, the son of a music professor. He graduated in Germanic studies and philosophy and wrote a thesis on influences of German expressionism on Bulgarian poetry during the interwar period. Since 1987 he has been teaching translation of German-language poetry at the University of Sofia.

== Educational background ==
1991–1992, Konstantinov was in Berlin as grantee of the Berliner Künstlerprogram (the Berlin Artistic Program) of the Deutsche Akademische Austaushdienst DAAD (the German Academic Exchange Service). He had lectures and conference participations in Berlin, Leipzig, Marburg, Vienna, Prague, Bern, Zurich and Lausanne. Konstantinov spent 1993–1994 at SUNY Geneseo, New York.

He published poems and articles also made radio-contributions on German, Austrian, Swiss and Bulgarian literature, as well essays on Hans Sachs, Goethe, Schiller, Hölderlin, E.T.A. Hoffmann, Nikolaus Lenau, Thomas Mann, Hermann Hesse, Franz Kafka, Bertolt Brecht, Lion Feuchtwanger, Stefan Zweig, Ödön von Horváth, Elias Canetti, Max Frisch, Friedrich Dürrenmatt, Heinrich Böll, Alfred Andersch, Martin Walser, Hans Magnus Enzensberger, Christoph Meckel.

His book translations amounted to 80 volumes.

Konstantinov lived in Sofia and in the Rhodope Mountains village Solishta, working as a freelance writer and translator.

== Awards ==
- 1993: The Translation Prize of the Ministry for Education, Arts and Culture, Vienna.
- 2006: The Prize of the Bulgarian Translator's Union for his entire work.
- 2013: The Literature Prize of Sofia for The Great German Poets from the 12th to the 20th Century. An Anthology. (2012)

== Works (selection) ==
=== Books ===
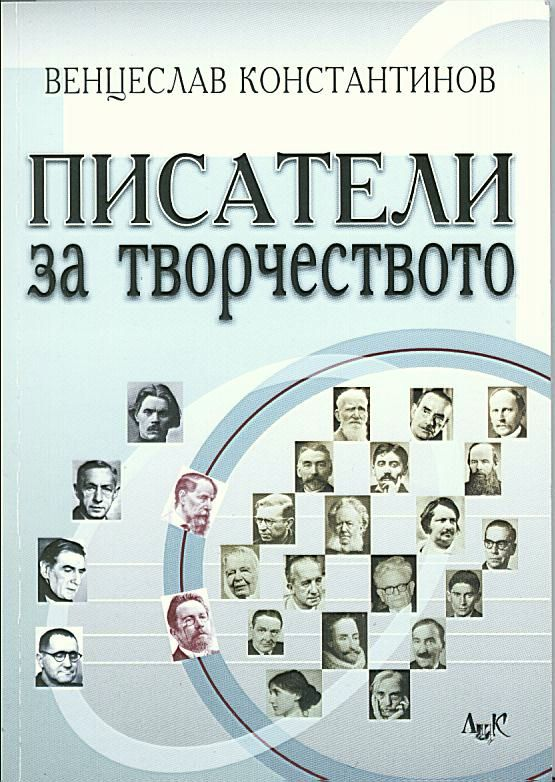
Writers on Creativity

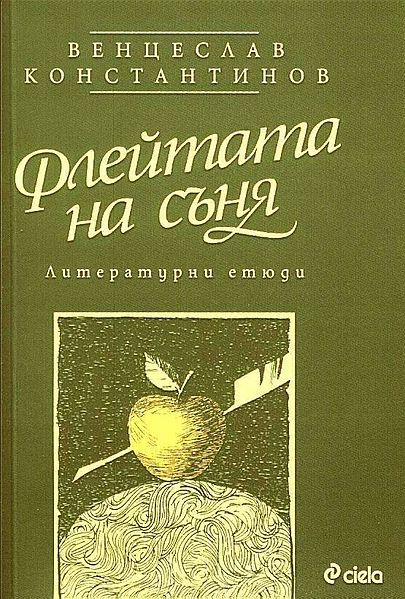
The Dream Flute

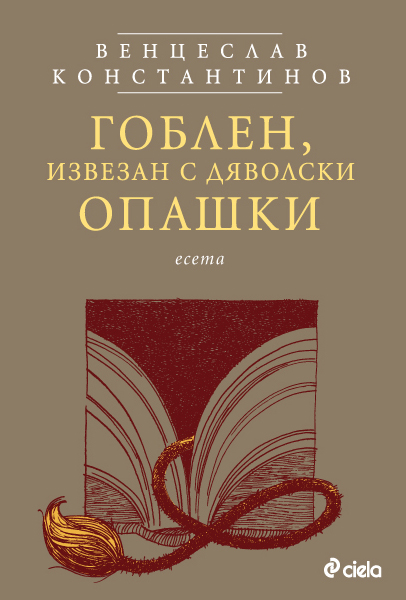
Gobelin, Embroidered with Devil Tails

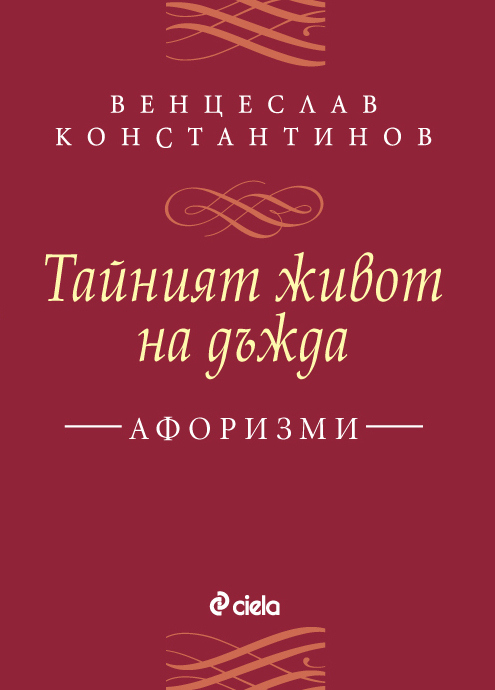
The Secret Life of the Rain

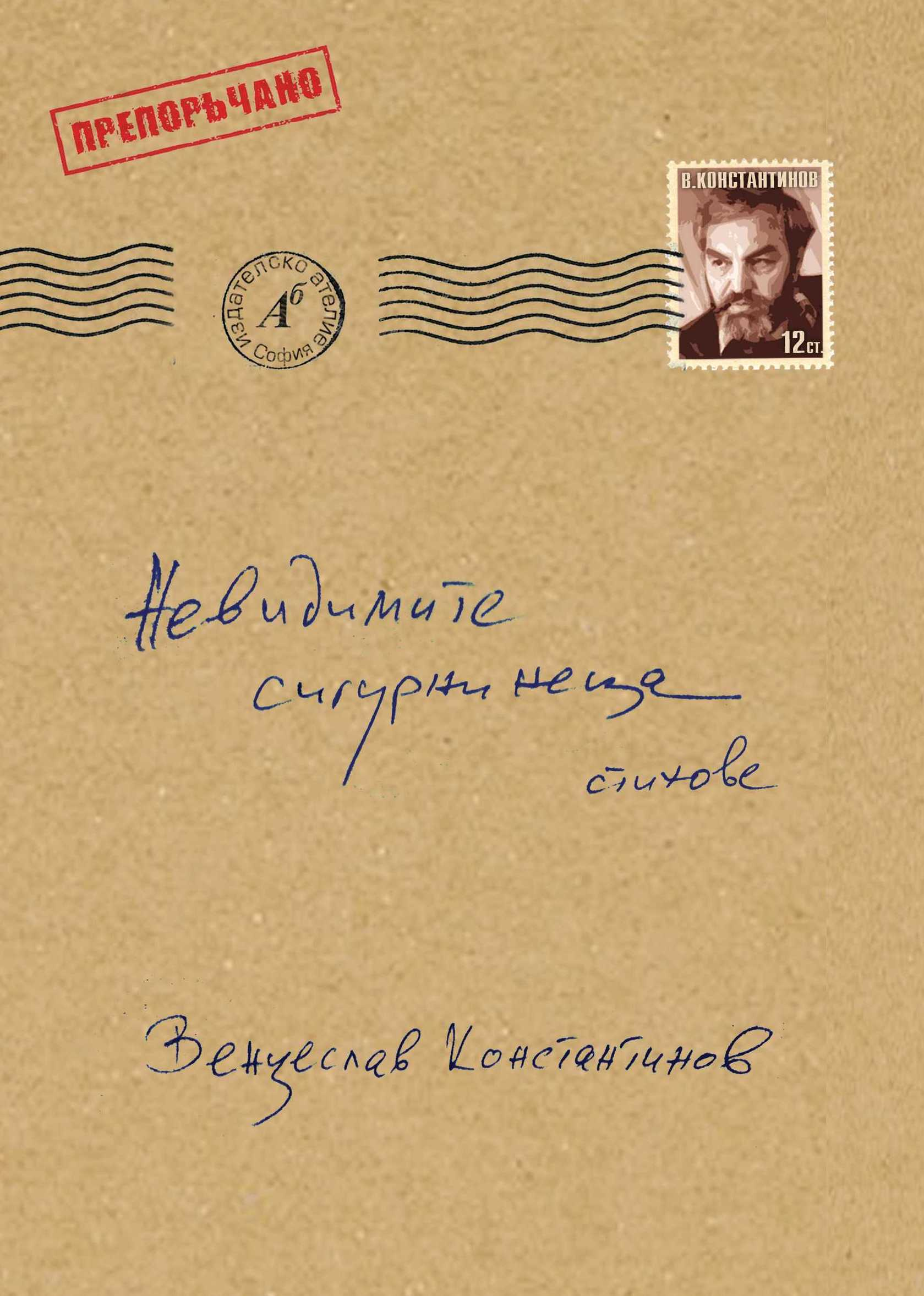
The Invisible Certain Things

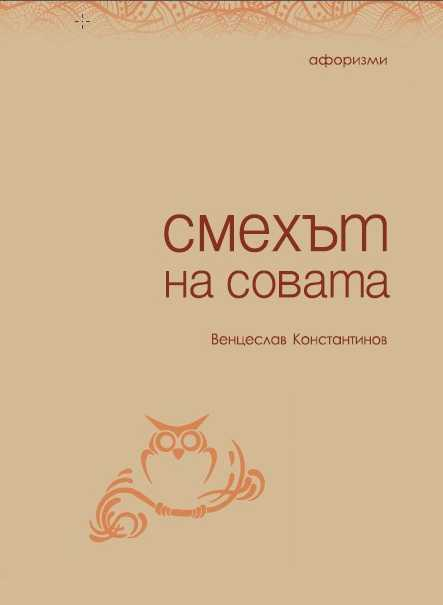
The Laughter of the Owl

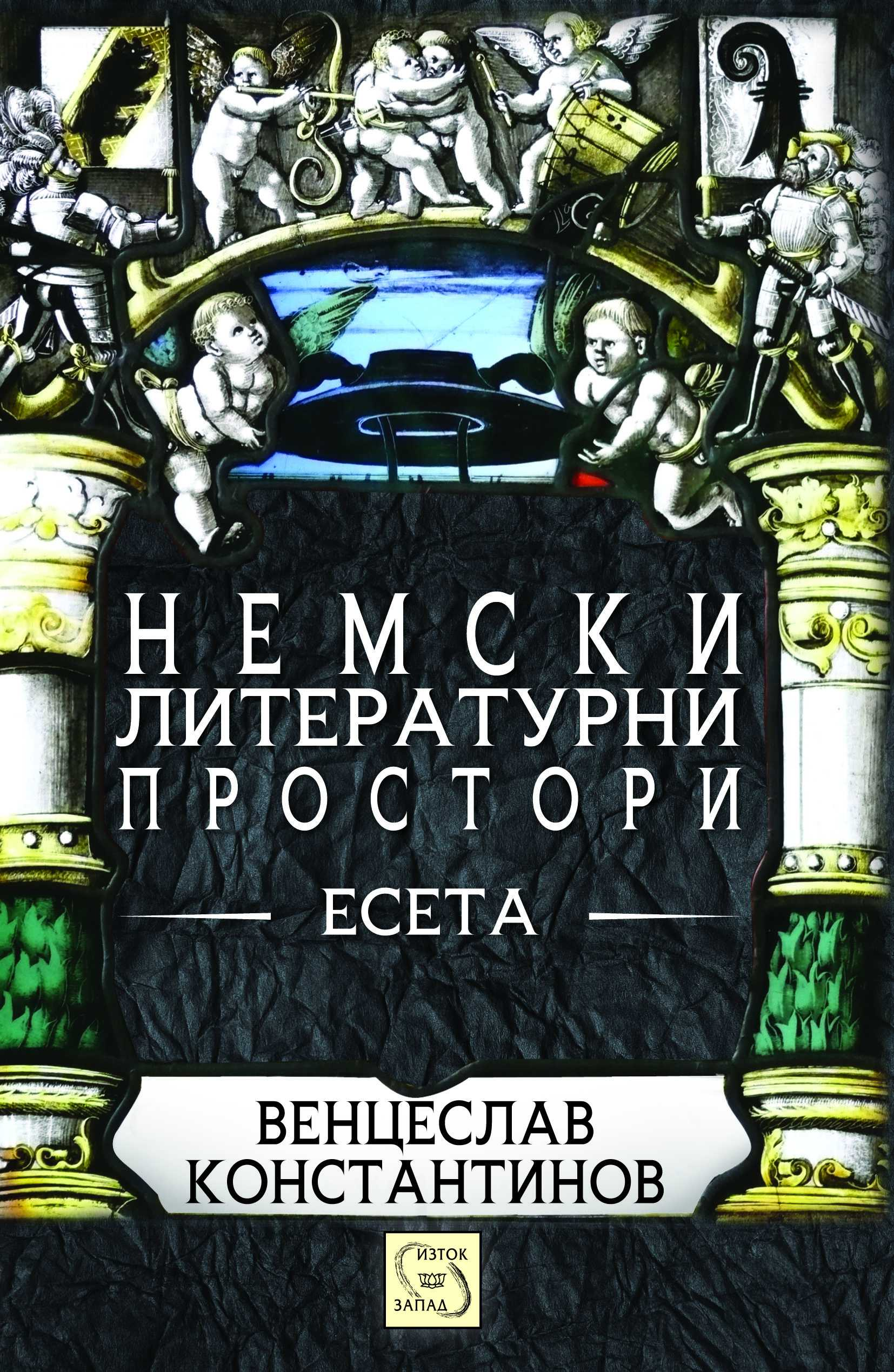
German Literary Spaces

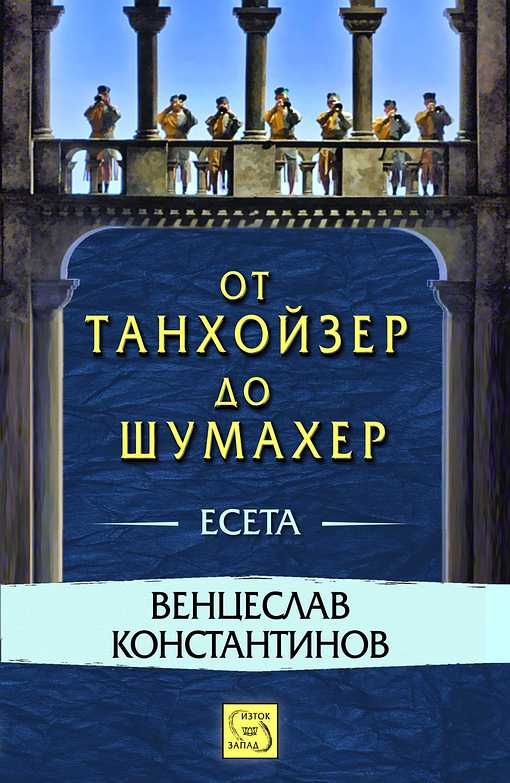
From Tannhäuser to Schumacher

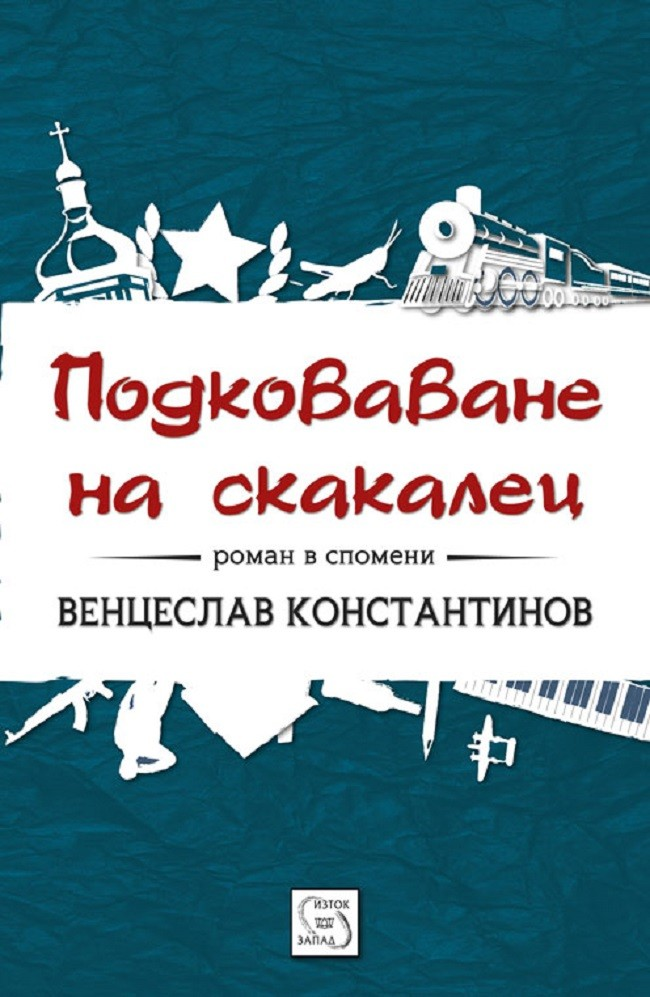
Shoeing a Grasshopper

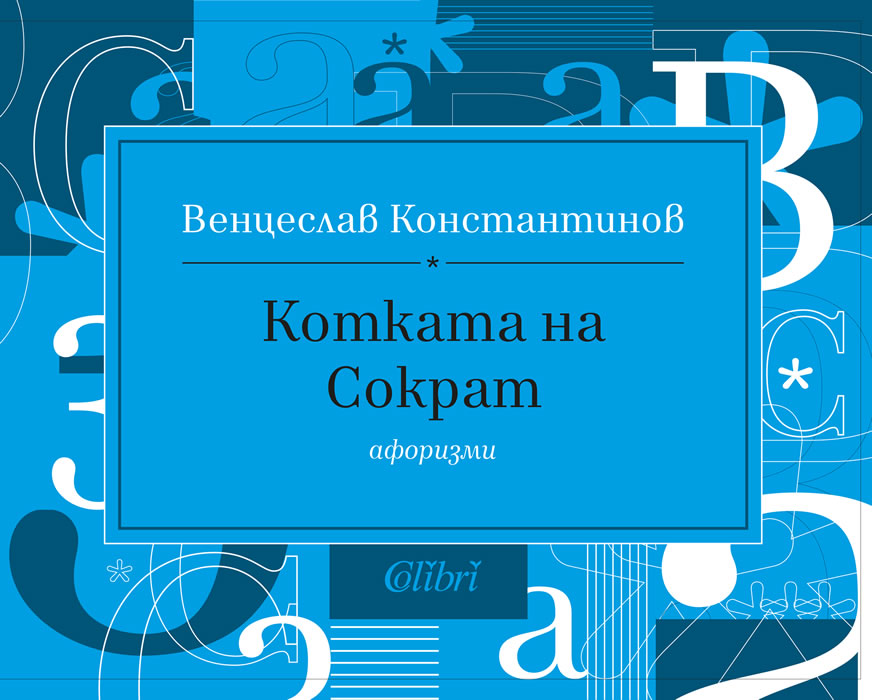
Socrates' Саt
- 2007: Writers on Creativity. Essays, Sofia, LiK, 276 p.
- 2010: The Dream Flute. Literary Studies, Sofia, Ciela, 288 p.
- 2011: Gobelin, Embroidered with Devil Tails. Essays, Sofia, Ciela, 148 p.
- 2012: The Secret Life of the Rain. Aphorisms, Sofia, Ciela, 278 p.
- 2013: The Invisible Certain Things. Poetry, Sofia, Ab, 32 p.
- 2014: The Laughter of the Owl. Aphorisms, Sofia, Ab, 230 p.
- 2014: German Literary Spaces. Essays, Sofia, Iztok-Zapad, 176 p.
- 2016: From Tannhäuser to Schumacher. Essays, Sofia, Iztok-Zapad, 128 p.
- 2017: Shoeing a Grasshopper. Novel of Memories, Sofia, Iztok-Zapad, 318 p.
- 2018: Socrates' Саt. Aphorisms, Sofia, Colibri, 196 p.

=== Anthologies ===
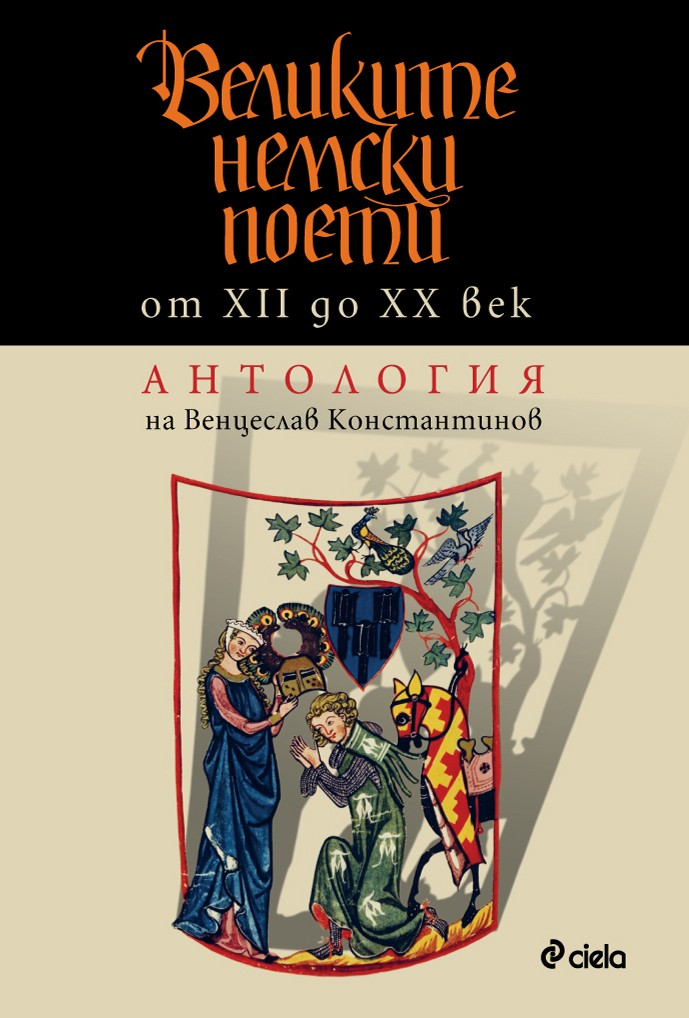
The Great German Poets from the 12th to the 20th Century, 2012

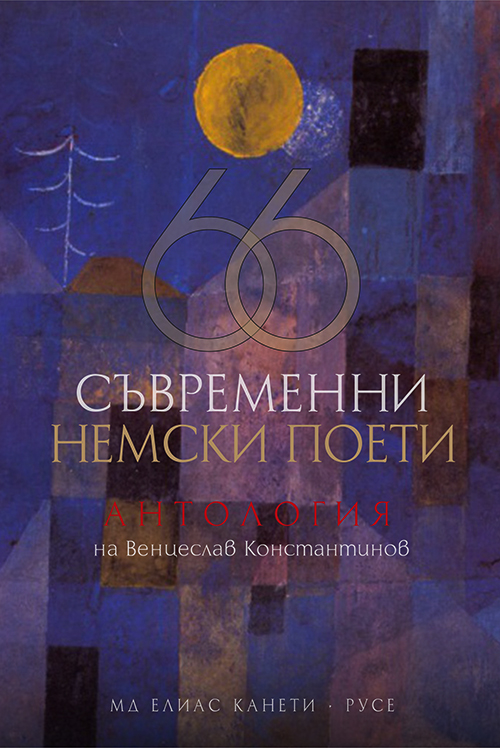
66 Contemporary German Poets, 2018

- Austrian Narrators, Sofia, Narodna Kultura, 1981, 344 p.
- At the Timber-Line. 10 German-Speaking Narrators of the 20th Century, Sofia, BZNS, 1983, 490 p.
- "I Softly Touch Your Hand". Poets from All Over the World on Mother and Motherhood, 1989.
- WORLD LIGHT. German Poetry from Earliest Times to the Present – Preface, Compilation, and Translation into Bulgarian by Ventseslav Konstantinov 2004–2008.
- THE DREAM FLUTE. German Narrators of the 20th Century – Preface, Compilation, and Translation into Bulgarian by Ventseslav Konstantinov 2006–2009.
- 20th Century German Essays – Compilation and Translation into Bulgarian by Ventseslav Konstantinov 2009.
- "I Quietly Dream of You...". German Love Poetry from Earliest Times to the Present – Compilation and Translation into Bulgarian by Ventseslav Konstantinov 2004–2008.
- The Great German Poets from the 12th to the 20th Century. An Anthology by Ventseslav Konstantinov, Sofia, Ciela, 2012, 392 p.
- 66 Contemporary German Poets. An Anthology by Ventseslav Konstantinov, Russe, Elias Canetti Publishing House, 2018, 628 p.

=== Essays ===
- Jura Soyfer and Elias Canetti. Two Poets' Fates in Vienna during the In-Between-War Period – Jura Soyfer. Journal of Jura Soyfer Society, Vienna, 2, 1992.
- Paradoxes sur le Traducteur. The Machine as Reader? Literary Translation and Computer-Translation – Literary Colloquium Berlin, 1992.
- The Poet and His Executioner. Censorship Cuts in Dürrenmatt's Novel "The Suspicion" – University of Zurich, 1992.
- In Search of Lost Identity. Bulgarian Literature in Transition – University of Bern, 1992
- The Battle Between the Dead. Orthodox and Islamic Religion in Communist Bulgaria – Europe Rundschau, Vienna, 3, 1992.
- In the Grand Scheme of History. The Image of Switzerland in Communist Bulgaria – Image and Encounter, Basel and Frankfurt a.M., 1996.
- Elias Canetti – Austrian writer? Metamorphoses Between Rustschuk and Vienna – TRANS: Online Journal for Cultural Studies, Vienna, September 1999.

=== Editor ===
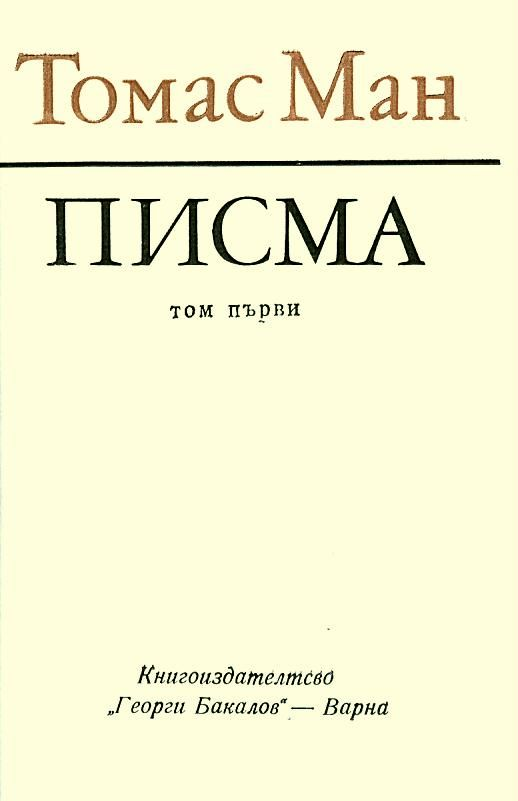
Thomas Mann, Letters, vol. I, 1988

- Rainer Maria Rilke, Selected Lyric, 1979.
- Max Frisch, Diaries, 2 vols, 1979.
- Ödön von Horvath, The Eternal Philistine. Selected Prose, 1983
- Ilse Aichinger, Mirror's Story. Selected Prose, 1984.
- Stefan Zweig, The European Idea. Selected Essays, 1985.
- Thomas Mann, Letters, 2 vols, 1988–1989.

=== Editor and translator ===
- Bodo Uhse, March in September. Selected Stories, 1967.
- Erich Kästner, Is Existentialism Curable? Selected Stories, 1968.
- Lion Feuchtwanger, The House on "Green Way". Selected Stories, 1981.
- Franz Kafka, The Metamorphosis. Selected Stories, 1982.
- Martin Walser, Runaway Horse. Selected Stories, 1982.
- Bertolt Brecht, The Trophies of Lucullus. Selected Stories, 1983.
- Christoph Meckel, Hotel for Sleepwalkers. Selected Poems, 1984.
- Hermann Hesse, The Stolen Suitcase. Selected Stories, 1986.
- Kurt Tucholsky, Interview with Myself. Poems and Stories, 1986.
- Heinrich Böll, The Dwarf and the Doll. Selected Stories, 1987.
- Alfred Andersch, Diana and the Flute-Player. Selected Stories, 1988.
- Erich Kästner, A Realistic Romance. Poetry and Prose, 2009.
- Franz Kafka, In the Penal Colony. Selected Stories, 2010.
- Heinrich Böll, Selected Stories, 2012.

=== Book translations ===
- Bertolt Brecht, Life of Galileo. A Play, 1964.
- Bertolt Brecht, Calendar Tales. Poems and Stories, 1975.
- Bertolt Brecht, A Short Organum for the Theatre. Essay, 1985.
- Bertolt Brecht, The Trial of Lucullus. Radio Play, 1985.
- Max Frisch, Stiller. Novel, 1978, 1982, 2011.
- Max Frisch, Homo Faber. Novel, 1973, 1981, 1995, 2012.
- Max Frisch, Man in the Holocene. Story, 1984.
- Max Frisch, Don Juan, or Love to Geometry. A Play, 1979.
- Friedrich Dürrenmatt, The Suspicion. Novel, 1972, 1984, 1989.
- Friedrich Dürrenmatt, The Tunnel. Story, 1981.
- Elias Canetti, Wedding. Drama, 1980.
- Stefan Zweig, Chess Story, 1973, 1987, 2013.
- Walter Benjamin, The Work of Art in the Age of Mechanical Reproduction. Essay, 1989.
- Hans Magnus Enzensberger, The Sinking of "Titanic". A Comedy, 1990.
- Erich Maria Remarque, Heaven Has No Favorites. Novel, 1972, 1985, 2009.
- Katja Mann, My Unwritten Memoirs, 1989.
- Friedrich Christian Delius, Mogadishu Window Seat. Novel, 1992.
- Henrik Ibsen, The Master Builder. Drama, 1979.
- Peter Hacks, Peace. A Play, 1985.
- Peter Hacks, The Beautiful Helene. A Play, 1986.
- Erich Kästner, The Man of Glass. Stories, 2016.
- Rainer Maria Rilke, Letters To A Young Poet, 2016.
- Lion Feuchtwanger, Nero's Death. Stories, 2018.

=== Translated authors ===
- Ilse Aichinger
- Peter Altenberg
- Alfred Andersch
- Erich Arendt
- Hans Carl Artmann
- Rose Ausländer
- Ingeborg Bachmann
- Hugo Ball
- Johannes R. Becher
- Walter Benjamin
- Gottfried Benn
- Thomas Bernhard
- Alvah Bessie
- Johannes Bobrowski
- Heinrich Böll
- Wolfgang Borchert
- Volker Braun
- Bertolt Brecht
- Clemens Brentano
- Erika Burkart
- Christine Busta
- Elias Canetti
- Paul Celan
- Adelbert von Chamisso
- Hanns Cibulka
- Heinz Czechowski
- Richard Dehmel
- Friedrich Christian Delius
- Radka Donnell
- Ulrike Draesner
- Friedrich Dürrenmatt
- Gunter Eich
- Joseph von Eichendorff
- Adolf Endler
- Hans Magnus Enzensberger
- Afanasy Fet
- Lion Feuchtwanger
- Erich Fried
- Max Frisch
- Stefan George
- Johann Wolfgang Goethe
- Eugen Gomringer
- Maxim Gorky
- Günter Grass
- Durs Grünbein
- Andreas Gryphius
- Peter Hacks
- Ulla Hahn
- Albrecht von Haller
- Hartmann von Aue
- Heinrich Heine
- Gustav Heinse
- Stephan Hermlin
- Hermann Hesse
- Georg Heym
- Wolfgang Hildesheimer
- Hugo von Hofmannsthal
- Friedrich Hölderlin
- Arno Holz
- Ricarda Huch
- Peter Huchel
- Henrik Ibsen
- Ernst Jandl
- Johannes Hadlaub
- Franz Kafka
- Marie Luise Kaschnitz
- Erich Kästner
- Bernhard Kellermann
- Rudyard Kipling
- Sarah Kirsch
- Wulf Kirsten
- Friedrich Gottlieb Klopstock
- Alexander Kluge
- Ursula Krechel
- Karl Krolow
- Günter Kunert
- Reiner Kunze
- Else Lasker-Schüler
- Christine Lavant
- Nikolaus Lenau
- Siegfried Lenz
- Detlev von Liliencron
- Kito Lorenc
- Katia Mann
- Thomas Mann
- Friederike Mayröcker
- Christoph Meckel
- Christian Morgenstern
- Eduard Mörike
- Robert Musil
- Neidhart von Reuenthal
- Margarete Neumann
- Novalis
- Albert Ostermaier
- Patrick Pearse
- Erich Maria Remarque
- Rainer Maria Rilke
- Joseph Roth
- Ralf Rothmann
- Peter Rühmkorf
- Hans Sachs
- Nelly Sachs
- Friedrich Schiller
- Kurt Schwitters
- Ernst Stadler
- Eva Strittmatter
- Jürgen Theobaldy
- Georg Trakl
- Kurt Tucholsky
- Ludwig Uhland
- Bodo Uhse
- Berthold Viertel
- Martin Walser
- Walther von der Vogelweide
- Franz Werfel
- Wolfgang Weyrauch
- Walt Whitman
- Christa Wolf
- Wolfram von Eschenbach
- Wolf Wondratschek
- Stefan Zweig
