= Furnadjiev =

Furnadjiev or Furnadzhiev (Bulgarian: Фурнаджиев), feminine: Furnadjieva or Furnadzhieva is a Bulgarian surname literally meaning "son of furnaji" (of baker). Notable people with the surname include:

- Atanas Furnajiev, Bulgarian anti-Osman revolutionary
- Dimitar Furnadjiev, Bulgarian cellist
- Nikola Furnadzhiev, Bulgarian poet and translator
- Stefan Furnajiev, Bulgarian poet
