= Stanke Dimitrov =

Bulgarian activist (1889–1944)

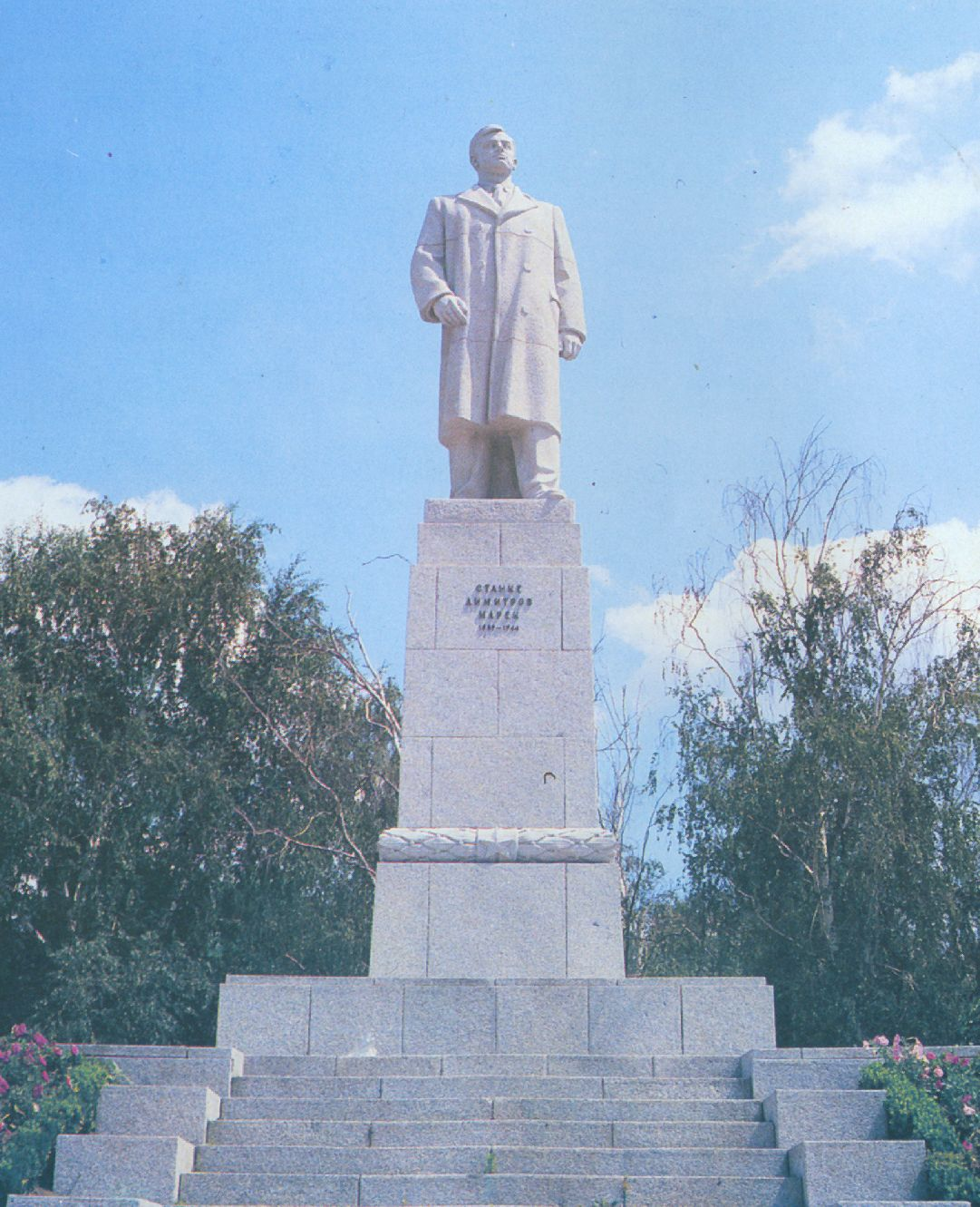

Stefan Dimitrov Todorov (Bulgarian: Стефан Димитров Тодоров; 5 February 1889 – 26 August 1944), better known as Stanke Dimitrov (Станке Димитров) or under the pseudonym Marek (Note: Acronym for Marxist, Antifascist, Revolutionary, Emigrant, Communist) (Марек), was a high-ranking Bulgarian Communist Party activist and anti-fascist.

Todorov was born in Dupnitsa. He joined the Bulgarian Social Democratic Workers' Party (Narrow Socialists) in 1904. In 1918, he participated in the Radomir Rebellion. In 1920, he was sentenced to twelve years' imprisonment, but was pardoned in 1921. In 1923, he took over the position of Secretary of the Central Committee of the Bulgarian Communist Party. He was one of the supporters of a plan that later became the St Nedelya Church assault. Dimitrov emigrated to the Soviet Union in 1925 and became a member of the CPSU. He taught at the International Lenin School and, from 1932, worked in the Balkan Secretariat of the Executive Committee of the Comintern. In 1935, he returned illegally to Bulgaria. He became a member of the Politburo of the BCP and again assumed the role of Secretary of the Central Committee. However, he returned to the Soviet Union in 1937 and became a member of the Foreign Bureau of the Central Committee of the BCP. From 1941 to 1944, he headed illegal radio station "People's Voice" of the Bulgarian resistance.

He died in an aviation accident near Bryansk, aged 55.

Stanke Dimitrov Air Strip in Bulgaria is named after him.
