= September Uprising =

1923 communist insurgency in Bulgaria

- Part of the Revolutions of 1917–1923
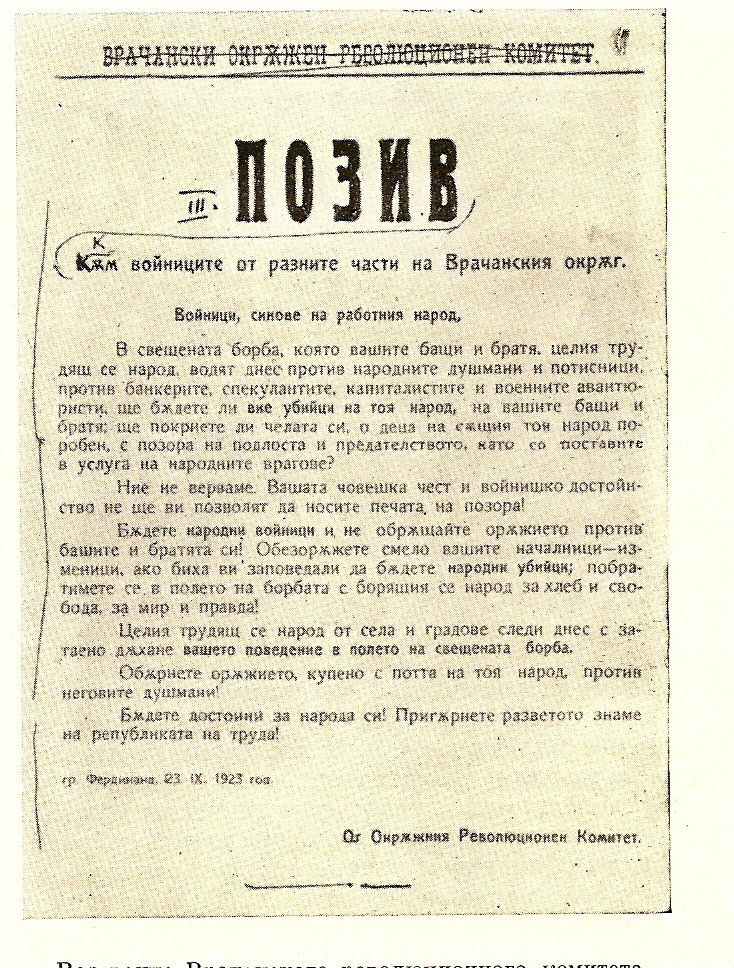
- Leaflet of the Vratsa revolutionary district intended for the soldiers sent to crush the uprising.
Date	14–29 September 1923 (2 weeks and 1 day)
Location	Bulgaria
Result	Bulgarian government victory: Rebellion crushed; rebels withdraw to the Balkan Mountains

Belligerents
Bulgarian government IMRO; Shpitskomandi (paramilitary volunteers); White émigré	Bulgarian Communist Party

Commanders and leaders
Aleksandar Tsankov	Georgi Dimitrov; Vasil Kolarov

Casualties and losses
- 841 killed

The September Uprising (Bulgarian: Септемврийско въстание, Septemvriysko vastanie), also called the September Riots (Септемврийски бунтове), was a 1923 communist insurgency in Bulgaria. The Bulgarian Communist Party (BCP) attempted to overthrow Alexandar Tsankov's new government established following the coup d'état of 9 June.

== Background ==
After the conclusion of World War I in Bulgaria, Tsar Ferdinand abdicated in favor of his son, Boris III, who became the new Tsar and freed opposition leaders, including Aleksandar Stamboliyski, the leader of the Bulgarian Agrarian National Union (BZNS). The party went on to win the 1920 Bulgarian parliamentary election, with Stamboliyski remaining prime minister. Though popular with the peasants, the Bulgarian Agrarian National Union antagonized the middle class and military, leading to a progressively more fragile position for the government.

During this time, relations between the Bulgarian Communist Party (BCP) and the ruling Bulgarian National Union of Agriculture remained tense. Although both parties were highly critical of the traditional parties in the country and jointly organized attacks in the press against their activists, the BCP's principled position was not to cooperate with the "bourgeois parties", including the BZNS, and it refused proposals for a coalition government in 1920, when it obtained the second largest share of votes after the BZNS. For its part, the BZNS was afraid of the strengthening its ties to the Communist Party, owing to its closeness to the Soviet Union, and as the ruling party, it was also dissatisfied with the trade union actions organized by the BCP.

Eventually, Stamboliyski was ousted following a military coup in June 1923, and the BZNS government was replaced by a new government led by right-wing politician Aleksandar Tsankov. During the subsequent armed resistance by Stamboliyski and his followers against the new regime (the so-called June Uprising), the leadership of the BCP took a position of neutrality. In the words of the senior communist functionary and then General Secretary of the Comintern, Vasil Kolarov, "for the BCP, the leaders of the BZNS are representatives of the rural bourgeoisie", and according to the future party leader, Georgi Dimitrov, "it is a question of vicissitudes between bourgeois forces". The Central Committee of the Party even ordered the communists in certain areas, which in some cases were involved in the actions of the farmers, to disassociate themselves from them. Eventually, Stamboliyski himself was killed and the rebellion was put down.

=== Uprising preparations ===
Despite the neutral stance of the Bulgarian Communist Party to the coup, for several days after the coup, the Comintern strongly condemned the neutrality of the BCP, criticized by Grigory Zinoviev, Karl Radek, and especially by Joseph Stalin, who even called for "a trial of the Communist Party in Bulgaria or its leaders". The Comintern compared the coup to the Kornilov coup in Russia and the Kapp coup attempt in Germany and issued instructions to organize an uprising and a general strike, and in order to implement this decision, Vasil Kolarov arrived in Bulgaria. In the eyes of the Comintern at that time, Bulgaria occupied an important place, because of the relatively good internal position of the local communist party, which in turn could be used to spread Communist influence across the Balkans, as a preparation for larger-scale actions in Central Europe and especially in Germany.

After being arrested and held for several weeks over falsified documents, Kolarov arrived in Sofia in early August, followed by another Comintern functionary, Alexander Abramovich. At a long meeting of the Central Committee of the BCP from 5 to 7 August, they managed to convince its members, with the exception of Todor Lukanov (party leader Dimitar Blagoev was seriously ill and did not participate in this meeting), to change sharply the course of the BCP, and to begin rapid preparations for an armed action. Already on 6 August, a military-technical committee was created to prepare for the uprising: the country was divided into 5 districts with distinct organizations, and plans for sabotage and guerrilla actions were being developed. Georgi Dimitrov was tasked with attracting factions outside the BCP to participate in the uprising, but especially as the BZNS had been weaked into impotence, the practical outcome of these contact attempts were insignificant.

In the following weeks, rumors about the uprising being prepared by the communists became widespread, and on 10 September, Dimitrov was forced to deny them in his article in the party's official publication, the Workers' Gazette. However, on 12 September, martial law was imposed throughout the country and around 2,000 party activists were arrested, but at the same time orders were received from the Comintern to immediately proceed with open anti-government actions. This was due to the Comintern's planned coup attempt in Germany, which was set to begin on 9 November.

On 15 September, the Central Committee designated four of its members, Vasil Kolarov, Georgi Dimitrov, Todor Lukanov and Todor Petrov, as the leading body of the uprising. At a meeting of the Central Committee on 17 September, attended only by Kolarov and Dimitrov, 22 September was set as the starting date, although in some places the mass arrests of communists had already caused spontaneous armed reactions. The goal of the uprising was declared to be the overthrow of the current cabinet and the establishment of a "worker-peasant government". Its leadership was assigned to the Main Military-Technical Committee, which, in addition to Kolarov and Dimitrov, included BCP Vratsa leader Gavril Genov and farmer Nikola Aganski.

The leaders of the uprising, Georgi Dimitrov and Vasil Kolarov, chose northwestern Bulgaria as the staging ground - an area closer to the border with Yugoslavia. The plan consisted in launching an uprising from the Vratsa district, which would then gather strength and march to Sofia to depose the government.

== Course of the uprising ==
=== Initial clashes ===
The first insurgents to take up arms were those from the village of Maglizh, Kazanlashko, already on 13 and 14 September. The BCP organization from the village of Golyamo Dryanovo also joined. The insurgents captured the two villages, but were not supported by the party organizations from the neighboring settlements, who decided to wait for the official announcement of the uprising. A few hours after the beginning of the uprising in Maglizh, they retreated to the mountains. On 12 September, a committee was formed in Stara Zagora, which decided to begin a rebellion in the district on 19 and 20 September. The uprising began in Stara Zagora at the appointed time, but was quickly crushed by government forces. At the same time, communists launched a rebellion in Nova Zagora, and the city and almost the entire municipality fell under control of the insurgents. On 19–20 September, villages in the vicinity of Chirpan revolted, and an unsuccessful attempt was made to capture the city. The failure of the uprising in Burgas allowed the government to mobilize strong military units and suppress the uprising across the Stara Zagora province. Particularly fierce fighting occurred in the villages of Maglizh, Enina and Shipka.

=== Uprising in northwestern Bulgaria ===
The main units of the Bulgarian Communist Party stuck to the pre-arranged plans, and the uprising in Northwestern Bulgaria thus began on the morning of 23 September, when armed Communist groups established control in a number of settlements, among them Ferdinand, Varshets and a large number of villages in the vicinity of Ferdinand, Oryahovo, Berkovitsa, Byala Slatina, and Lom. In Ferdinand, that same afternoon, military units managed to drive the Communist rebels out of the city, but not long afterwards, a large and well-armed crowd from the neighboring villages pushed the military out took over the city again, and the next morning Dimitrov and Kolarov arrived to Ferdinand, meeting with the leader of the local insurgents, Hristo Mihaylov.

Civilian volunteers were enlisted to fight against the insurgents, later referred to as "sphitskomandi" - the name originating from the sharp tips of the shoes - type "shipts" - that they wore. The communist leadership of the uprising also announced a military mobilization for the creation of workers-peasant military units, with transport and supply units also being created in the areas it controlled. The rebels proceeded to requisition and slaughter animals in the homes of the villagers to feed the insurgent units.

Rebel forces attacked Lom and captured a large part of it, led by the mayor of Dobri Dol, Rangel Ganev. Military reinforcements from the Vidin garrison were sent to help the cavalry regiment and the government-armed civilians in Lom, who had been encircled by the insurgents. The Communist rebels were aided by an artillery unit under the command of Andrei Ivanov, an Orthodox priest turned revolutionary, but it failed to tip the scales in their favor. After three days of street fighting, the government forces, commanded by Lieutenant Colonel Halachev, drove out the rebels from Lom.

Another confrontation ensued on 24 September in Berkovitsa, under the control of a token military force and armed civilians loyal to the government. The town was attacked by a group of poorly armed, disorganized insurgents numbering about 600–800, but despite this, government forces chose to abandon the town, which fell into the hands of the Communists. From there, 200-300 people moved to the Petrohan Pass, where they observed military units moving from Sofia and retreated.

In the municipalities of Vratsa, Vidin, and Belogradchik, there were only isolated rebellions in certain villages, which were quickly brought under control by government forces.

25 September was the decisive day of the uprising. On the morning of that day, under the leadership of Gavril Genov, the insurgents attacked military reinforcements heading to put down the uprising in the town of Boychinovtsi, near Ferdinand, and in the ensuing Battle of Boychin scored a major victory against government forces. This victory raised the morale of the insurgents and they began moving out to capture Vratsa, but on the way, they were attacked and severely defeated by government troops. Rebel forces were also defeated near Brusartsi after a fierce battle with the units of the Vidin garrison. Battered and demoralized, the insurgents failed to capture the desired objectives, while heavily armored reinforcements were being deployed by the government in the direction of Ferdinand and Berkovitsa.

=== Uprisings in other parts of the country ===
In Plovdiv and its surroundings, the uprising was not supported by the local population and practically did not break out. In Pazardzhik, some villages revolted, including Muhovo and Lesichevo. On 24 September, the insurgents unsuccessfully attacked the Saranyovo train station. Additionally, the uprising broke out on a limited scale in Ihtiman and Samokov, as well as in separate villages in the vicinity of Sofia and Pirdop. Ihtiman and Kostenets were captured, but the insurgents were quickly dispersed by army reinforcements from Sofia. Scattered uprisings in villages around Tarnovo, Shumen and Burgas were similarly short-lived.

After the departure of Dimitrov and Kolarov to northwestern Bulgaria, no preparatory measures for an uprising were taken in Sofia. This was partly due to the Sofia chapter of the BCP being highly skeptical of the uprising's potential, with party leader Dimitar Blagoev stating Bulgaria was not yet ready for revolution. In the end, however, a military revolutionary committee consisting of Anton Ivanov, Dimitar Gichev and Todor Atanasov was organized, but the committee was exposed and its members were arrested as early as 21 September. The failure of the uprising in Sofia allowed the government to freely use the powerful military units concentrated in the capital against the insurgents in other parts of the country.

Even before the beginning of the uprising, an agreement was concluded between the Bulgarian Communist Party and the Internal Macedonian Revolutionary Organization (IMRO), according to which the BCP would not start an uprising in Petrich district, and in return the IMRO would not interfere with its preparation in other parts of the country. However, in spite of the agreement, the communist supporters in the Razlog district rebelled, under the leadership of Vladimir Poptomov. On 23 September, the insurgents managed to capture Mehomiya. IMRO thus intervened in the conflict on the side of the government. After negotiations, the majority of the insurgents surrendered their weapons to the IMRO, while some esacped to the mountains. A leftist detachment of the IMRO, the Gornojumai "Hristo Botev" battalion, was disbanded and some of its participants were killed by the IMRO. Poptomov himself was captured by the IMRO, but was later released and managed to flee Bulgaria.

=== End of the rebellion ===
Early in the morning of 26 September, Kolarov and Dimitrov assessed the situation as hopeless and fled to the Yugoslav border, which they crossed the next day. On 27 September, government troops entered Ferdinand. By 28 and 29 September, only sporadic fighting took place between the retreating insurgents and the army, and all previously occupied villages and towns were brought back under government control.

== Aftermath ==
=== Reasons for the failure of the uprising ===
It is debatable to what extent the leaders of the September Uprising themselves expected a different result than the actual one. This is evidenced by the deep and prolonged disputes on the issue in the leadership of the BCP and the need for strong pressure from the Comintern to undertake the uprising. From the point of view of the Comintern itself, the rebellion in Bulgaria had only an auxiliary role for its main plan for an uprising in Germany in October, which however never materialized. The choice of the leaders of the uprising, Kolarov and Dimitrov, to center it near the Yugoslav border was also probably due to the awareness of expected failure.

The military preparadness of the rebels was likewise insufficient, especially in the face of heavy reinforcements being deployed from Sofia. Even during the BCP's major victory at Boychinovtsi, the insurgents were poorly armed - possessing only 2,000 rifles, 4 machine guns and 1 mountain cannon, thus managing to arm less than half of its detachment of 5000 rebels. Since more than half of them were unarmed, some rebels plucked sunflower stalks from the surrounding fields to make it appear in the morning twilight that they were carrying rifles. This would inspire Geo Milev for the sunflower metaphor in his poem "Septemvri".

According to some authors, also referring to later assessments of the uprising in communist historiography, the very purpose of the uprising was the purification and radicalization of the BCP. According to this hypothesis, the Comintern, dissatisfied with the passive position of the party after the 9 June coup, saw in the uprising a means of removing the more moderate party leaders and transforming the party into a more compact but fully Bolshevized organization.

The possibilities of the BCP to carry out the uprising were, furthermore, severely limited by the imposed martial law and the mass arrests of communist activists immediately before it began. The actions of the communists thus acquired a more limited, regional dimension, and did not find mass support among the supporters of the overthrown BZNS. In parts of the country, even the communists themselves did not welcome the idea of an uprising with enthusiasm, and armed actions did not occur in the big cities - Sofia, Varna, Burgas, Plovdiv - where most of the supporters of the BCP are concentrated. Thus, the government had a free hand in utilizing the large military detachments in these cities against the insurgency in the rural areas.

Despite the BCP's efforts to agitate for revolt among the Bulgarian soldiers, the army sided entirely with the government, although most of the soldiers came from poor rural families traditionally sympathetic to the BZNS and the BCP. In the memoirs of Veselin Branev, the following story is described: Colonel Boris Brakalov, a hero of the Balkan wars, a man with left-wing ideas, who found out about the uprising being prepared, at a meeting with Dimitrov and Kolarov offered to go over to their side with all the military units he commanded. Dimitrov and Kolarov refused the offer. The railways of the country, in which some of the biggest strikes broke out in the previous years, functioned uninterrupted during the uprising, led by the Social Democratic Minister Dimo Kazasov.

=== Government response ===
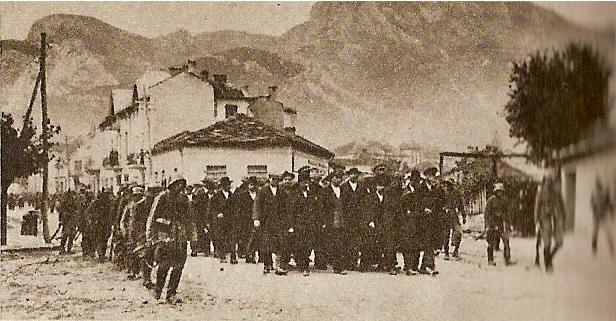
Arrested rebels in Vratsa

Following the end of the uprising, government forces arrested and executed many of those responsible. There were documented cases of brutal treatment by paramilitary forces against captured rebels and their helpers. The speeches of Colonel Kuzmanov's shpitskommando detachment on 5 September 1923 in the village of Lopushna inspired Anton Strashimirov to write his work "Horo". Kuzmanov ordered the villagers to dance around the corpses of slain insurgents piled up in the square and to spit on them.

Only a small proportion of the victims of the uprising died in combat. Most were massacred by paramilitary groups, including refugees from the Bolshevik regime in Russia, and in some cases the violence was motivated by personal vendettas and political conflicts not directly related to the rebellion. The largest number of deaths occurred in the Ferdinand district, with a total of about 337 deaths. Mass shootings were carried out in Gorna Gnoinica, Varshets, Berkovitsa, and Ferdinand, including a large number of militarily mobilized insurgents, while many of the organizers and leaders fled to Yugoslavia. Some of the rebels remained in the country, fleeing to the mountains to avoid government forces.

The number of casualties during the uprising and its suppression is disputed, with estimates ranging from less than 1,000 to around 30,000. Estimates in some historiography from the time of the Communist regime go as high as around 30,000. In a detailed documentary study published in the Communist period by the Museum of the Revolutionary Movement in Bulgaria (part of "Звезди във вековете" ("Stars in the Ages"), a named album with photographs and biographical data), 841 insurgents died in the uprising and the repressions that followed it. According to the modern historian Georgi Markov, the number of victims amounted to about 5,000 people.

The failure of the September Uprising dealt a heavy blow to the Bulgarian Communist Party, which turned from a second parliamentary force into a marginal but highly radicalized group. Many activists of the party were killed, sent to prison, or forced into exile, while others - because of a fundamental disagreement with the violent methods or simply frightened by the repression - distanced themselves from the party. As a result of the uprising, party members decreased tenfold to about four thousand people. Nevertheless, the BCP was officially banned only at the beginning of 1924, taking part in the elections in November 1923, and in 1926 those convicted of participating in the September Uprising were amnestied.

The September Uprising gave the government of Alexander Tsankov the opportunity to present itself to the West as a fighter against the communist threat, and to plead for the easing of some of the military restrictions imposed on Bulgaria by the Treaty of Neuilly-sur-Seine.

== Historiographical assessment ==
Bulgarian Marxist historiography from the period 1944-1989 considers Tsankov's government as fascist, and the events in September 1923 were characterized as the first anti-fascist uprising in Europe. Following the fall of Communism in Bulgaria, this interpretation fell out of favor.

Modern historians give a different assessment of the events of September 1923. They characterize these events as the September Riots based on studies and documents related to the organization, character, leadership, scale of the actions, their results, mass and popular support. The main reason for this difference is the assessment of the leadership of the rebellion, and the behavior of the main revolutionary committee, as a result of which the unrest did not cover the large cities in Bulgaria, and instead, fighting were only took places in mountainous regions of northwestern Bulgaria, with sporadic rebellions in individual villages along the river, in Augusta, in Pazardzhik, Shumensko, Tarnovsko, Burgas, Starozagorsko and elsewhere.

According to the English historian Richard Crampton, the uprising was hopeless by design, because even if the Communists had seized power, "the Western powers would undoubtedly have allowed the neighboring countries to overthrow a Bolshevik government in Sofia, as had already happened in Budapest in 1919.".

French writers Henri Barbusse and Romain Rolland and lawyer Marcel Villard wrote books and articles in defense of the victims of the uprising.

== Depictions in art ==
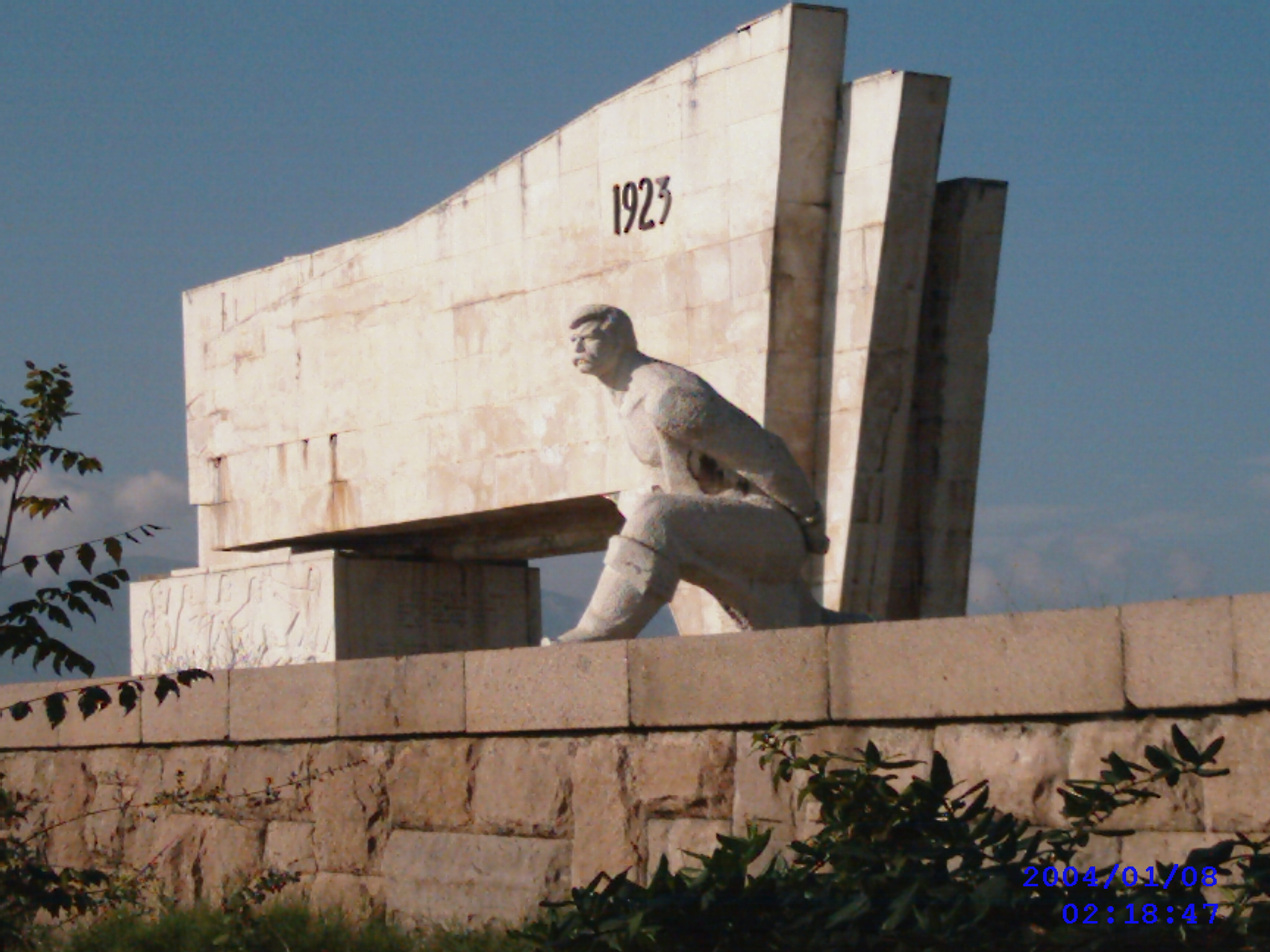
Communist-era memorial of the September Uprising in Pazardzhik

The September Uprising and the harshness of its suppression provoked a strong reaction among the Bulgarian intelligentsia of the time. Among the more famous works dedicated to the uprising are the poem "September" by Geo Milev, the novel "Horo" by Anton Strashimirov, and the painting "September 1923" by Ivan Milev. Among other famous works are the poetry collections "Spring Wind" by Nikola Furnadzhiev and "Sacrificial Bunches" by Assen Razcvetnikov. These two writers, alongside Angel Karaliychev, author of the book of short stories "Rye", and Georgi Tsanev, were dubbed the "September Four", a prominent group that introduced leftist ideas to the Bulgarian literature of the interwar period.

During the period 1944-1989 monuments to the September Uprising were erected in settlements whose inhabitants participated in it. In 1954 the film Septemvriytzi, dedicated to these events, was released.

== See also ==
- Bulgarian coup d'état of 1923
- Bulgarian coup d'état of 1934
- Bulgarian coup d'état of 1944
- St Nedelya Church assault

== Bibliography ==
- Kolarov, V. (2016). ""The Lessons of October" and the Bulgarian Communist Party". Trotsky's Challenge. Leiden: Brill. pp. 464–480. doi:10.1163/9789004306660_019. ISBN 9789004217256. LCCN 2015032934.
- Kosev, Dimitur (1981). "The Historical Significance of the September 1923 Uprising in Bulgaria". Southeastern Europe. 8 (1): 210–223. doi:10.1163/187633381X00145. ISSN 1876-3332.
- Sygkelos, Yannis (2009). "The National Discourse of the Bulgarian Communist Party on National Anniversaries and Commemorations (1944–1948)". Nationalities Papers. 37 (4): 425–442. doi:10.1080/00905990902985678. ISSN 0090-5992.
- Voukov, Nikolai (2003). "Death and the desecrated: monuments of the socialist past in post-1989 Bulgaria". Anthropology of East Europe Review. 21 (2): 49–54.
- Zhechev, Toncho (1981). "The September 1923 Uprising and Bulgarian Culture". Southeastern Europe. 8 (1): 224–244. doi:10.1163/187633381X00154. ISSN 1876-3332.
- Недев, Недю (2007). Три държавни преврата или Кимон Георгиев и неговото време. София: „Сиела“. ISBN 978-954-28-0163-4.
- Троцкий, Л (1924). Уроки Октября (in Russian). Ленинград: Прибой.
- Фосколо, Мона (2013). Георги Димитров. Една критическа биография. София: Просвета. ISBN 978-954-01-2768-2.
