= St. Nedelya Church bombing =

1925 bombing of a church in Sofia, Bulgaria by Communist Party militants

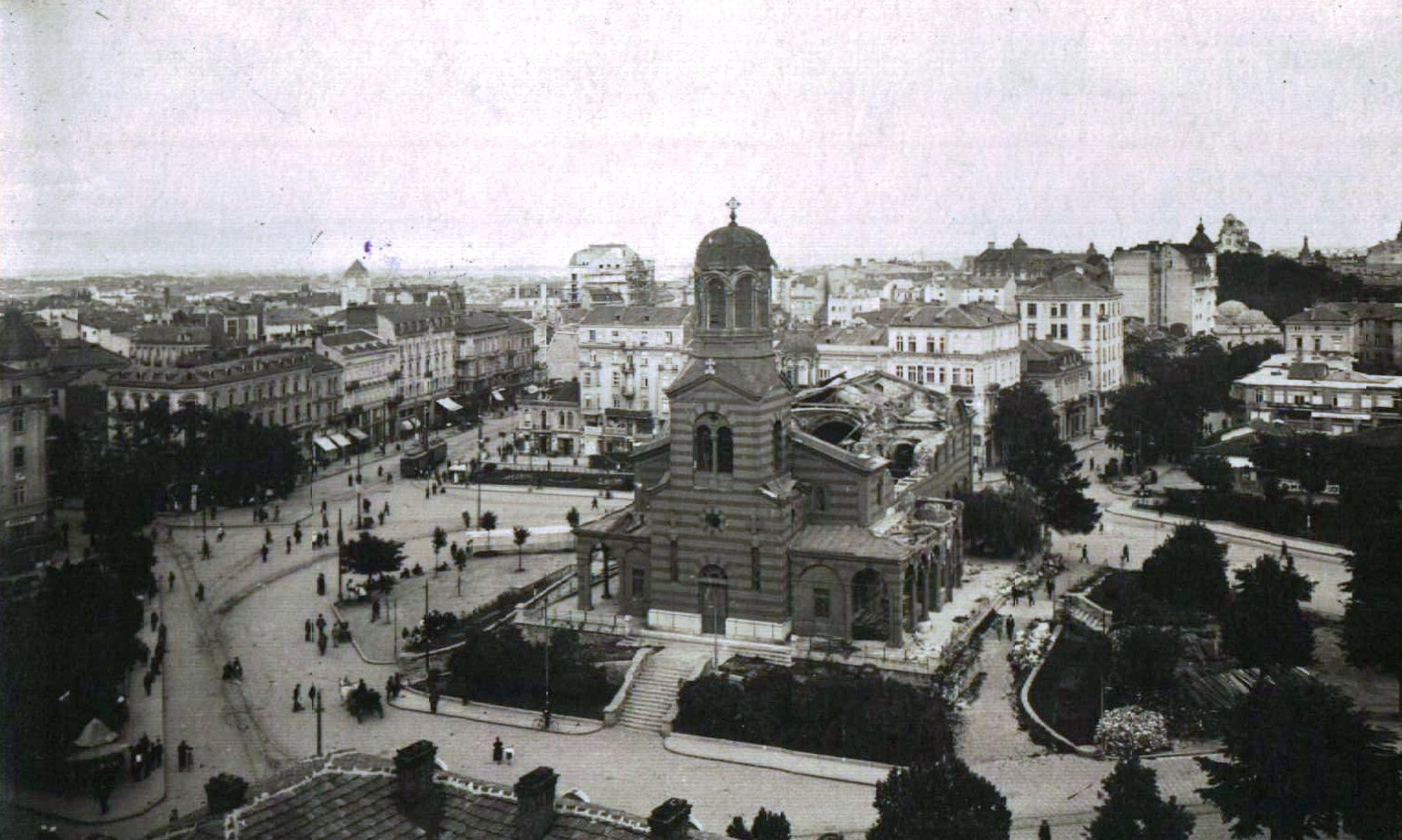
- St Nedelya Church after the assault
- Date: 16 April 1925; 101 years ago
- Location: St Nedelya Church; 42.6967°N 23.32137°E
- Motive: Far-left Extremism
- Perpetrator: Bulgarian Communist Party
- Deaths: 213
- Injuries: 500+

The St Nedelya Church bombing was a terrorist attack on St Nedelya Church in Sofia, Bulgaria. It was carried out on 16 April 1925, when a group of the Military Organisation of the Bulgarian Communist Party directed and supplied by the Soviet Military Intelligence blew up the church's roof during the funeral service of General Konstantin Georgiev, who had been killed in a previous communist assault on 14 April. Over 200 people, mainly from the country's political and military elite, were killed in the attack and around 500 bystander worshipers, who attended the liturgy, were injured.

The bombing is by far the deadliest terrorist act in Bulgarian history and the deadliest in all of Europe until the Air India Flight 182 in 1985 60 years later.

== Preparation ==
After the failure of the September Uprising in 1923 and the prohibition of the BCP by the Bulgarian Supreme Court of Appeal on 2 April 1924, the Communist Party found itself in a difficult situation. The government arrested many activists and the organization's very existence was under threat. A Special Punitive Group was established as part of the Central Committee of the BCP, including Yako Dorosiev, Captain Ivan Minkov and the future leader of Bulgaria Valko Chervenkov. The Military Organization (MO) of the BCP, led by Minkov and Major Kosta Yankov, set up small isolated groups (shestorki) that carried out individual attacks. This, however, did not prevent the police from discovering and destroying the illegal structures of the BCP with relative ease.

Later, in December 1924, the organization recruited Petar Zadgorski, a sexton at the church. Dimitar Hadzhidimitrov and Dimitar Zlatarev, head of the MO armaments section, suggested that Police Director Vladimir Nachev be assassinated and a large-scale assault be carried out during his funeral service. In this way they hoped to eliminate a large number of key figures in the police hierarchy and thus lessen the pressure that the authorities exerted on the BCP. The idea was welcomed by Stanke Dimitrov, Secretary of the Central Committee, who discussed it with Georgi Dimitrov and Vasil Kolarov, General Secretary of the Comintern, in early 1925. Nevertheless, they did not approve the proposal, as they thought such an action should first be preceded by preparations for a large-scale uprising that would follow the attack.

Meanwhile, the government continued to increase its pressure on the BCP. Following the killing of Valcho Ivanov, an influential functionary, on 11 February 1925, an amendment to the Law for the Protection of the State which increased the power of the authorities was introduced on 10 March. Yako Dorosiev, head of the MO, was then assassinated on 26 March. These events threatened the physical survival of the BCP leaders and angered the MO leadership. They announced that they were ready to put their plan into practice despite the Comintern's disapproval. It has been theorized that the assailants acted with the support of Soviet services, but there is no documentary evidence to support this hypothesis.

== Execution of plan ==
The MO management assigned one of its groups to the task, led by Petar Abadzhiev, who himself recruited the sexton, Petar Zadgorski. With his help, Abadzhiev and Asen Pavlov carried in a total of 25 kg of explosives to the attic of St Nedelya Church over the course of a couple of weeks. The explosives were mounted in a package above one of the columns of the main dome, situated by the south entrance to the building. The plan was to detonate the bomb by a 15 metre-long cord that would allow the assailants a chance to escape.

Due to the strengthened guard at Vladimir Nachev's funeral service, the MO chose another victim whose funeral would be used as bait for the attack. At 20:00 on 14 April, General Konstantin Georgiev, a deputy of the ruling Democratic Alliance, was assassinated by Atanas Todovichin in front of a Sofia church while heading there for the evening service with his granddaughter.

The funeral service of General Georgiev was set for 16 April, Holy Thursday. In order to increase the toll, the organizers sent forged invitations on behalf of the Association of Reserve Officers. At 07:00 on the 16th, Zadgorski led Nikola Petrov to the roof, where Petrov would detonate the bomb on Zadgorski's signal. The funeral procession entered the church at 15:00 that afternoon. The service was conducted by Bishop Stefan, the future Bulgarian Exarch. The coffin was initially placed right next to the column that was to be blown up, but then moved forward due to the large number of people that came to attend the ceremony.

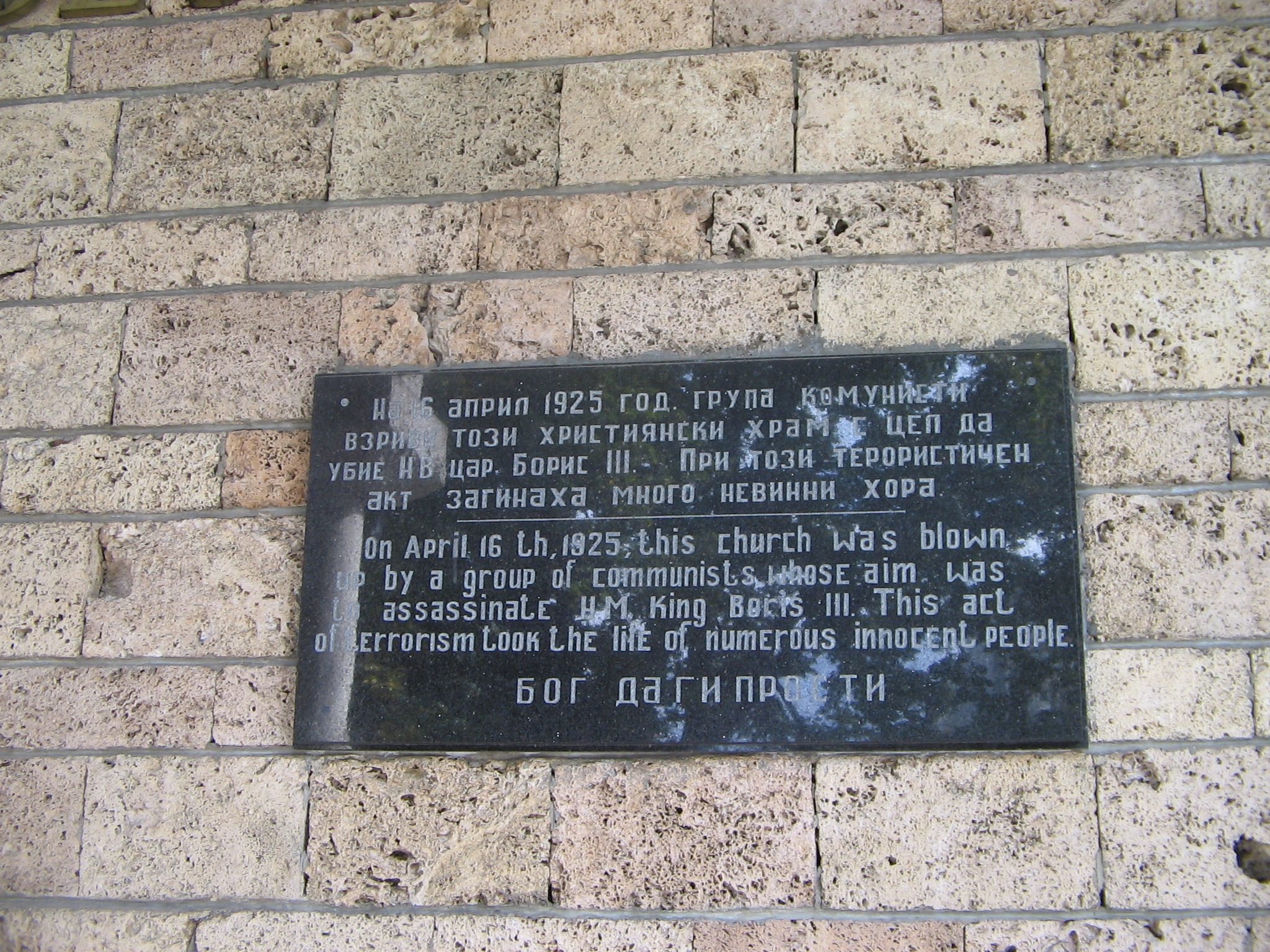
A plaque at the church commemorating the victims of the bomb attack

In accordance with the MO group's plan, when the congregation had gathered and the service began, Zadgorski gave Nikola Petrov a signal to detonate, after which the two left the building at around 15:20. The explosion demolished the main dome of the church, burying many people inside. The blast indoors caused further damage. A total of 213 people were killed by the explosion and another 500 were injured. By chance, all government members survived. The monarch, Tsar Boris III, was not in the church, as he was attending the funerals of those killed in the attempt on his own life in the Arabakonak pass in Stara Planina.
Among the victims were

- General Kalin Naydenov (Minister of War during World War I);
- General Stefan Nerezov (commander of the Bulgarian Army at Dojran);
- General Ivan Popov,
- General Grigor Kyurkchiev,
- Lieutenant General Krastyu Zlatarev,
- then-Mayor of Sofia Paskal Paskalev,
- as well as another governor, the chief of police, and three deputies.

25 women and children were also killed.

== Direct consequences ==
The evening after the terrorist attack, martial law was declared. The attack caused a wave of violent repressions organized by the Military Union with the government's tacit approval. During the following two weeks, approximately 450 people were executed without trial, including poets Geo Milev and Hristo Yasenov and journalist Yosif Herbst (a mass grave of those killed in 1925 was discovered in the 1950s during the construction of a dam, and Milev's corpse was identified by his glass eye - he had lost an eye in World War I). Many other communists were heavily judged for taking part in the organization. The MO leaders Kosta Yankov and Ivan Minkov were among those assassinated. A few of the organizers of the attack, such as Zlatarev, Petar Abadzhiev and Nikola Petrov, managed to escape to the Soviet Union through Yugoslavia. Abandoned by his party, Zadgorski surrendered to the police and made a confession.

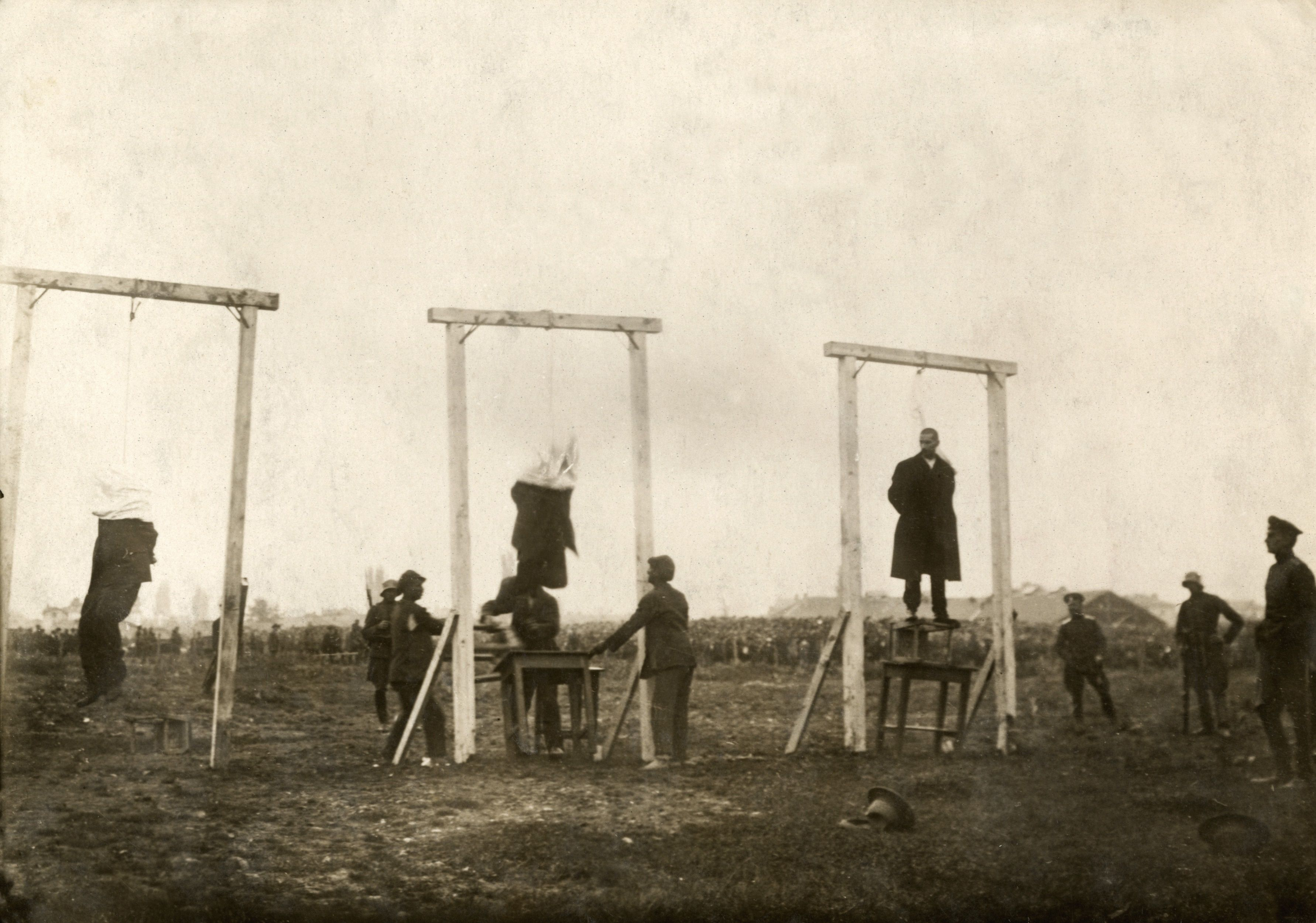
Public execution of Georgi Koev, Petar Zadgorski and Marko Fridman

The trial took place before a military court in Sofia between 1–11 May 1925. Zadgorski, Lieutenant-Colonel Georgi Koev, who unsuccessfully attempted to hide Minkov, and Marko Fridman, an MO section leader, were all sentenced to death. Stanke Dimitrov, Petar Abadzhiev, Dimitar Grancharov, Nikolay Petrini and Hristo Kosovski received capital punishment by default, with the last three of those having already been killed in the previous weeks. Marko Fridman, the highest-ranked individual of those accused, confessed that the organization was financed and supplied with weaponry from the Soviet Union, but pinned the ultimate responsibility for the attack on Yankov and Minkov, who, according to Fridman, acted without the BCP management's agreement.
