= Ivan Milev =

Bulgarian painter and scenographer (1897–1927)

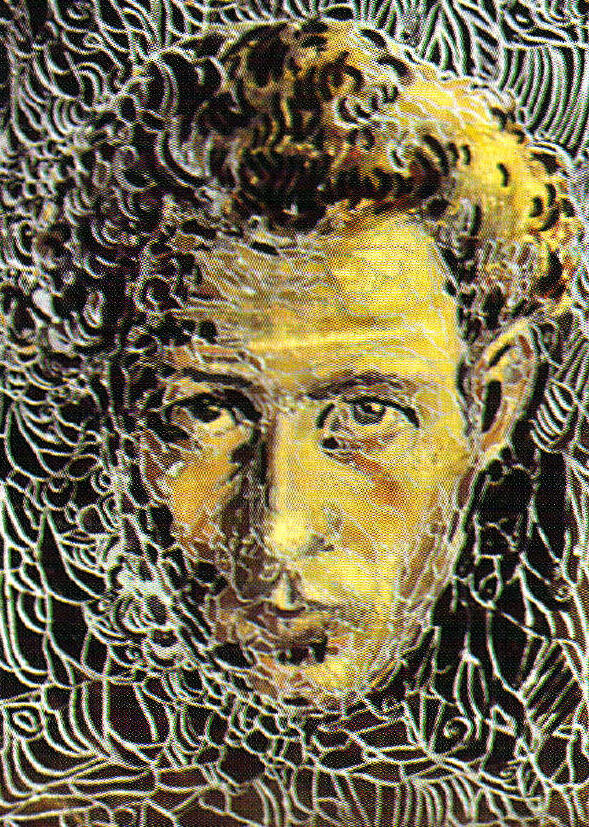
Self-portrait of Ivan Milev.

Ivan Milev Lalev (Bulgarian: Иван Милев Лалев; 18 February 1897 – 25 January 1927) was a Bulgarian painter and scenographer regarded as the founder of the Bulgarian Secession and a representative of Bulgarian modernism, combining symbolism, Art Nouveau and expressionism in his work.

== Biography ==
Ivan Milev was born in the town of Kazanlak in the family of shepherd Milyu Lalev. In 1917–1918, he fought as a soldier in World War I. On 18 November 1918, the same year that he finished high school in his hometown, he arranged an exhibition in Kazanlak. For two years he was a teacher in Gorski Izvor, Haskovo Province. In 1920, he was admitted to the National Academy of Art in Sofia, where he studied under Prof. Stefan Badzhov, and had three one-man exhibitions. He also contributed to the communist comic magazine Red Laughter (Червен смях, Cherven smyah) as an illustrator and cartoonist.

In the summer of 1923, he visited Turkey, Greece and Italy with a group of fellow students. He was introduced to the achievements of the Italian Renaissance and the Italian Baroque in Rome, Naples, Florence and Venice. In 1926, he graduated in set decoration from the National Academy and worked for the Ivan Vazov National Theatre as a stage designer. Afterwards he became an independent freelance painter and illustrator and he also painted frescoes. With a group of colleagues he took part in the Shipka Memorial design competition, but came second.

Generally living in poverty, Milev had a brief 18-month marriage to opera singer Katya Naumova; their daughter Mariya Mileva eventually became an architect. Milev died of Influenza in Sofia on 25 January 1927, shortly before his thirtieth birthday.

Regarded as one of the great masters of distemper and watercolour painting in Bulgarian art, Milev often created socially loaded works. His characteristic decorative style was much influenced by the European Secession, but it was also related to Bulgarian folk art and icon painting. Milev's paintings are exhibited in the National Art Gallery, Sofia Art Gallery, the Shumen, Kazanlak and other cities' galleries.

Milev is portrayed on the obverse of the current 5 Bulgarian leva banknote issued in 1999, with some of his works depicted on the reverse side.

== Works in the Bulgarian National Art Gallery ==
- Gadulka player— 1924, gouache
- Triptych or The Maglizh monastery— 1924, gouache
- Fortune-telling— 1924–1926, watercolour and gouache
- Village madonna— 1925, watercolour
- Refugee women— 1925, watercolour
- September 1923— circa 1926, watercolour
- Winter landscape— 1926, watercolour and gouache
- Winter fairy tale— 1926, watercolour and gouache
- Our mothers are always dressed in black— 1926, watercolour
- Refugees— 1926, watercolour and gouache
- The black bread— 1926, watercolour and gouache
- Composition— circa 1926, watercolour and gouache

== Gallery ==
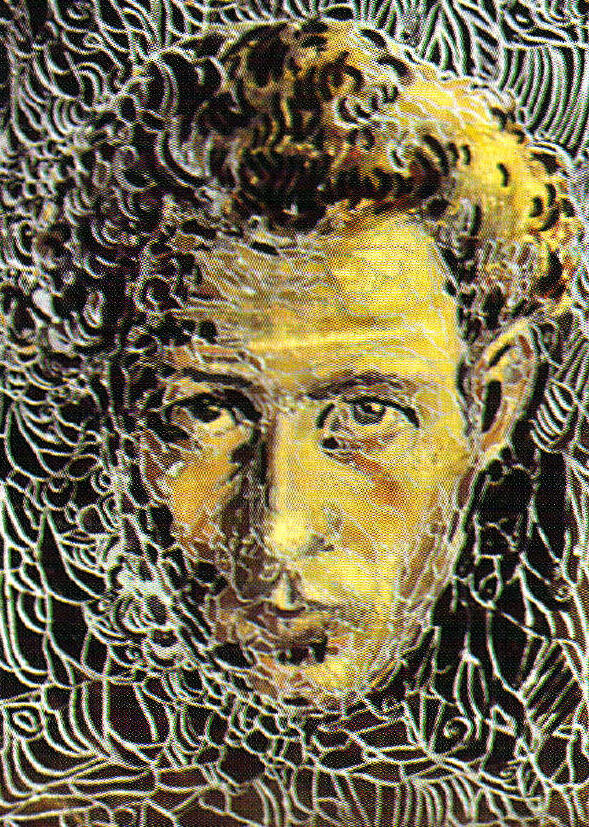
Self-portrait (1920)

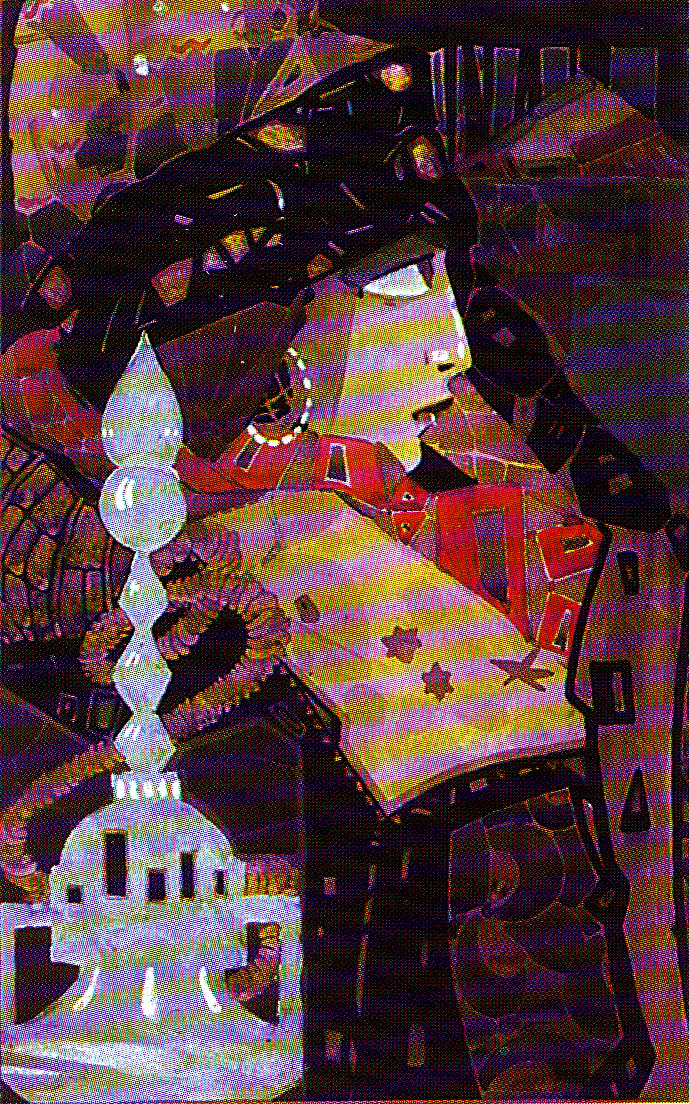
Ahinora (1922)

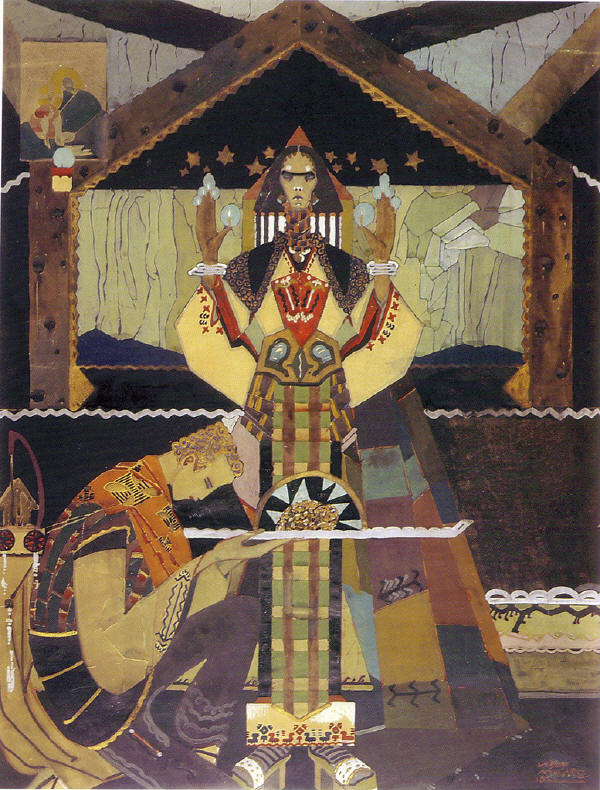
Obruchenie, 1923.

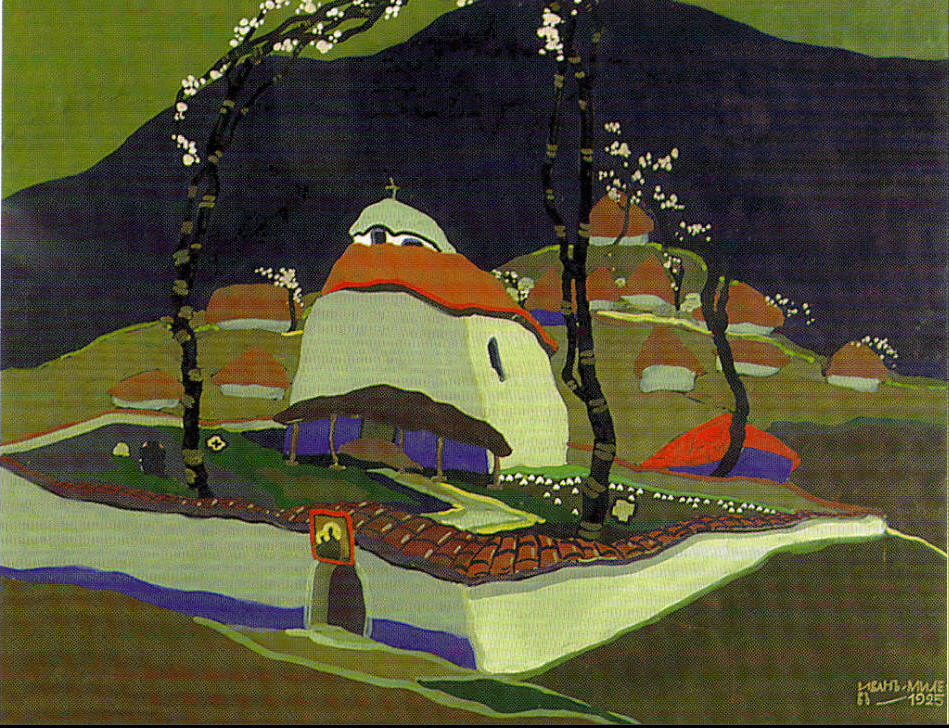
The Maglizh monastery, 1924.

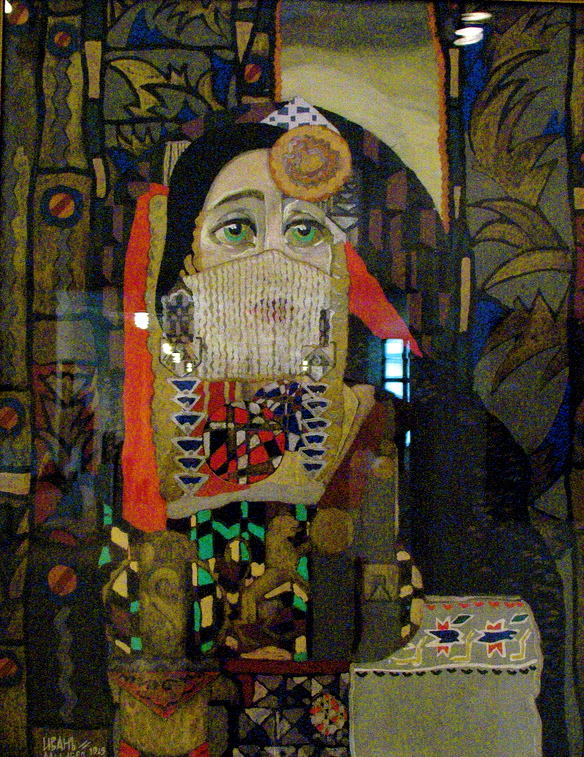
Ahinora (1925)

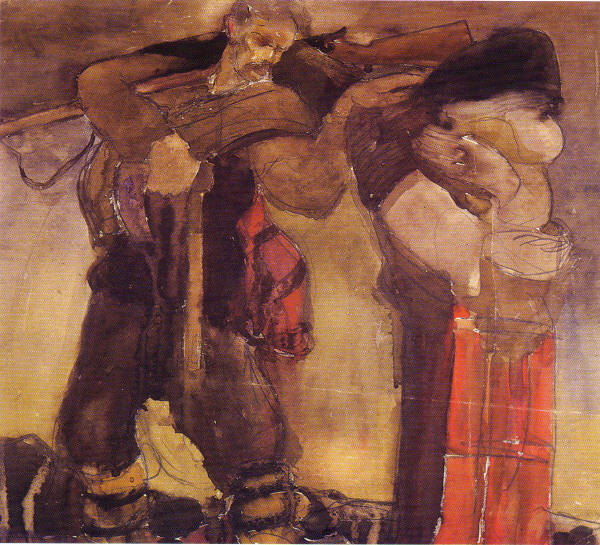
September 1923, 1925.

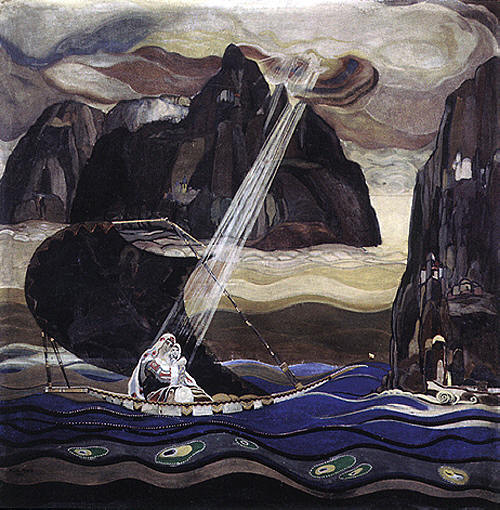
Legend of the Holy Mountain, 1926.

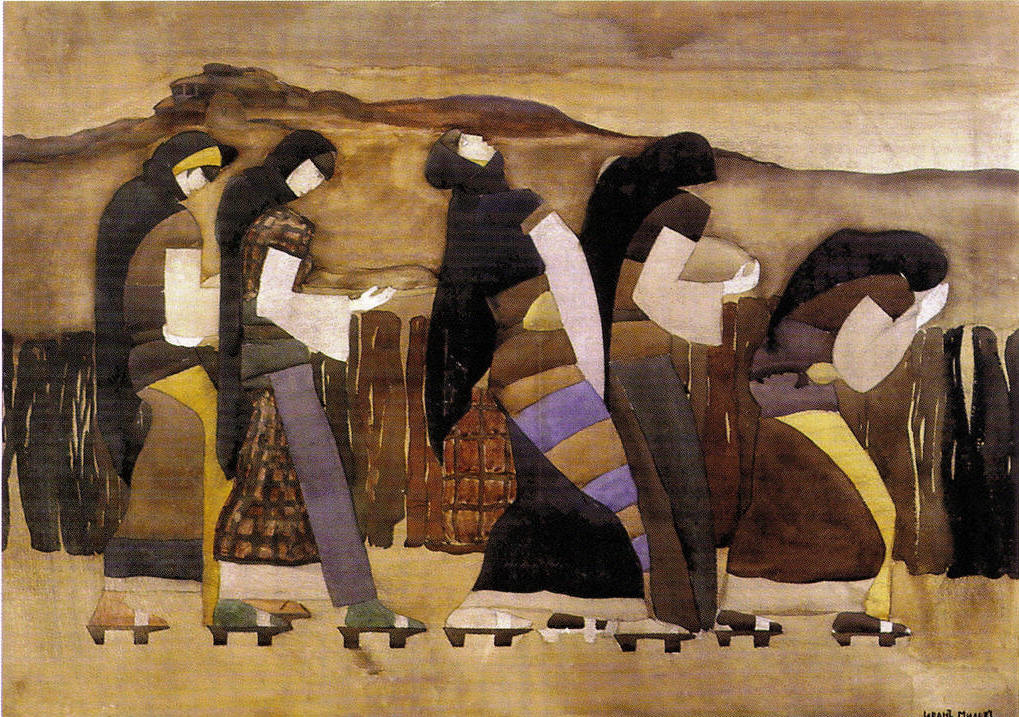
Our mothers are always dressed in black, 1926.

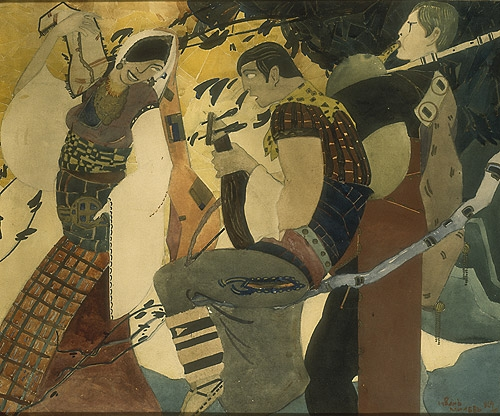
Gadular (1926)
