= Assen Razcvetnikov =

Bulgarian writer (1897–1951)

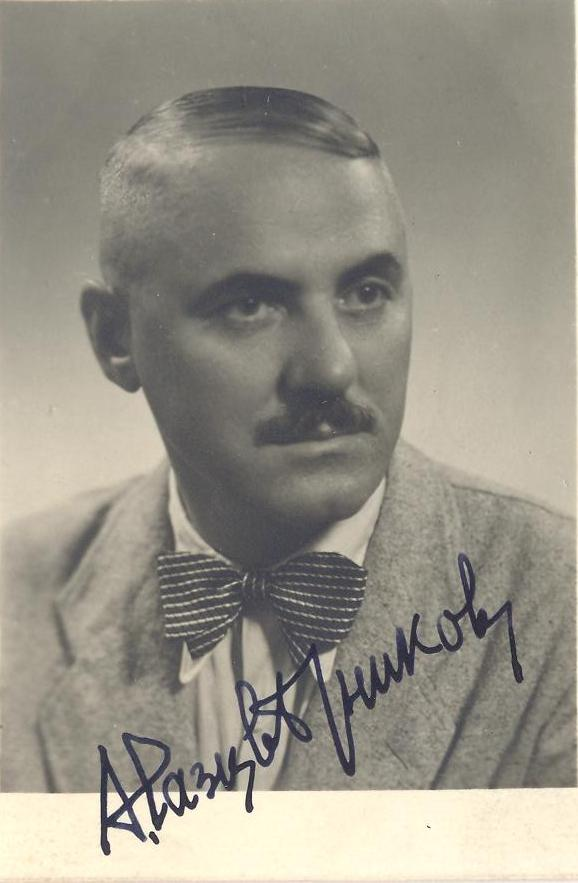
- Born: Assen Petkov Kolarov; 2 November 1897; Draganovo, Veliko Turnovo Province; Bulgaria
- Died: 30 July 1951 (aged 53); Moscow; USSR
- Writing career
- Genre: Poetry

Assen Raztsvetnikov (Bulgarian: Асен Разцветников; born Assen Petkov Kolarov, Асен Петков Коларов; 2 November 1897 – 30 July 1951) was a Bulgarian poet, writer and translator.

== Biography ==
=== Early years ===
Assen Raztsvetnikov was born in a family that owned a substantial estate in the countryside. His father was a teacher. His mother was of a fine voice and was renowned for her performances of folklore songs that she learned from the grandfather of young Raztsvetnikov, Peter who was a fiddler.

Raztsvetnikov graduated from the Veliko Turnovo high school in 1916. He then went on to work at the Veliko Turnovo communication center and later on at the postal telegraph service at Gorna Oryahovitsa station. He studied Slavic philology at Sofia University (1920), and after obtaining his degree travelled to attend lectures in aesthetics in Vienna and Berlin (1921–1922). Finally, he received a law degree from Sofia University in 1926.

=== Teaching career and education ===
Raztsvetnikov taught in Gabrovo (1926–1929). In the period 1930–1934, he moved to teach Bulgarian language in a gymnasium in Sofia, where he also took lead as a librarian. In 1934 he became librarian in the Postal services. After 1934, Raztsvetnikov dedicated himself to literature: he actively collaborated with literary magazines "Nov Put" and "Zlatorog".

After the end of World War II and the establishment of the new Communist regime on 9 September 1944, Raztsvetnikov was recruited as a translator at the Institute of Literary Translation in the Ministry of Communication.

== Literary career and legacy ==
Assen Raztsvetnikov began trying his hand at verse compositions when he was still a student in high school. His first publication appeared in the magazine "Bulgarian" under the penname Anri. Throughout his collaboration with leftist writers and magazine editors of the period, he became one of the most distinguish representative of the "September Four" along with Angel Karaliichev, Nikola Furnadzhiev, and Georgi Tsanev. His involvement and ideas during the period lied at the core of his first collection of poems, "Jertveni kladi" (1924).

A turning point in Raztsvetnikov's literary life and career came in 1924 when he participated in a memorial reading that marked ten years from the death of poet Peyo Yavorov in the Sofia university. Raztsvetnikov, Angel Karaliichev, Nikola Furnadzhiev and Georgi Tsanev were convicted by fellow BCP members in cultivating social bourgeois mentality. Under the hail of accusations, Razcvetnikov gradually distanced himself from the leftist jargon and ideology, ended his collaboration with the major leftist magazine "Nov Put" and joined instead magazine "Zlatorog" edited by Vladimir Vassilev.

In the thirties, Raztsvetnikov concentrated his literary energy into creating poetry for children, thus, leaving behind a panoply of books with riddles, verses, and tales that has nourished generations of young readers ever after. As to his second major occupation, he translated classical works from German, among which his most important contribution was the translation of Ode to Joy by Friedrich Schiller.

== Bibliography ==
- Речник на българската литература, т.3, с. 178–181. София, Изд. на БАН, 1982./Dictionary of Bulgarian Literature. Sofia: BAN.1982. v3, 178-181pp.
- Георгиев, Л. Георги Цанев. Литературно-критически очерк., 1976./Georgiev, L. Georgi Tsanev.Literary criticism workshop (ocherk).1976.
- "Асен Разцветников." Wikipedia. Sat. Mar 29, 2014. Web. May 28, 2014.
- "Асен Разцветников." liternet. n.d. Wed. May 28, 2014. <http://liternet.bg/publish2/araztzvetnikov/index.html>
