= Angel Karaliychev =

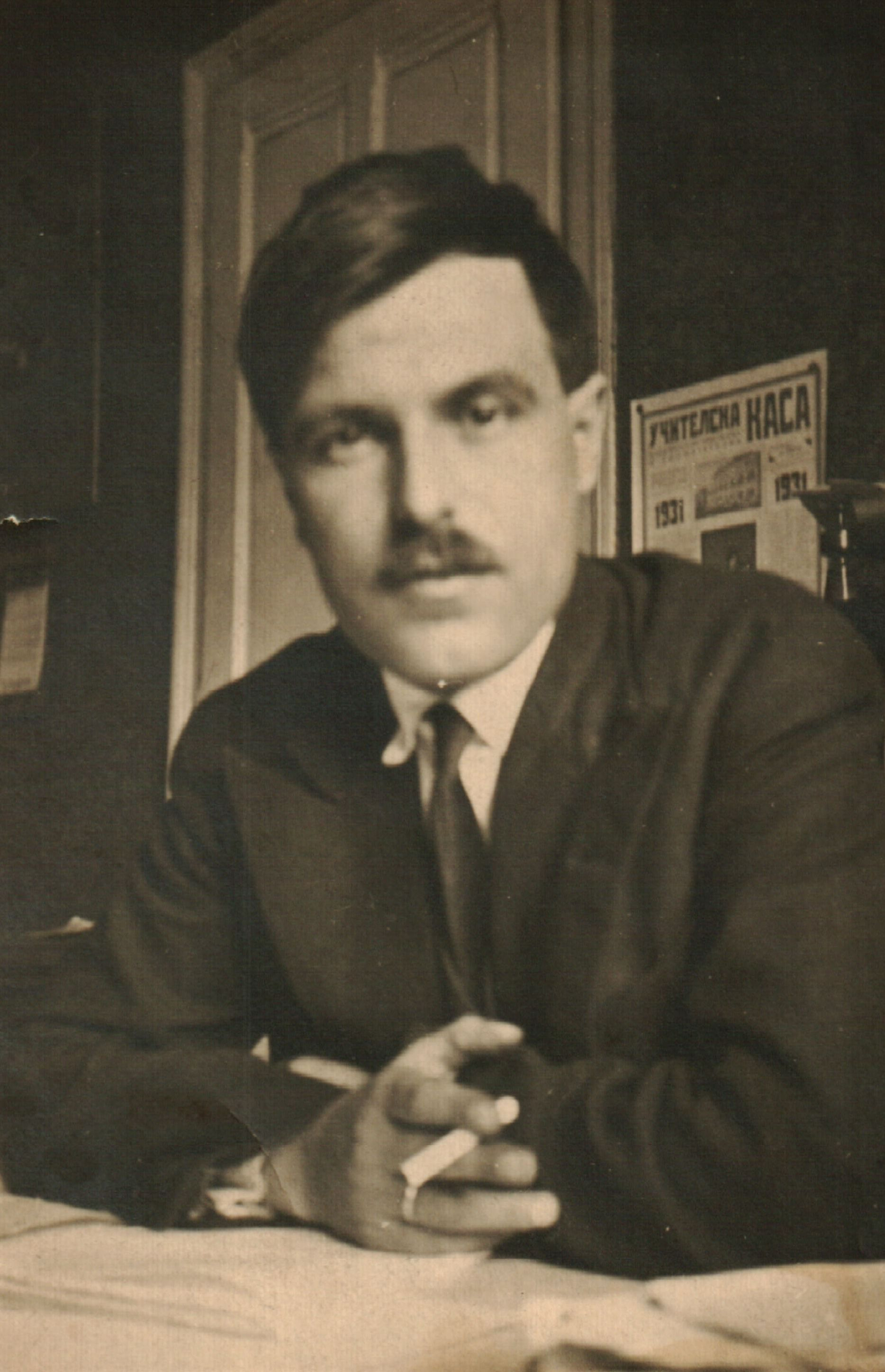
Karaliychev in 1932

Angel Ivanov Karaliychev (Bulgarian: Ангел Иванов Каралийчев; 21 August 1902, Strazhitsa – 14 December 1972, Sofia) was a Bulgarian writer of children's literature.

== Early life and education ==
Karaliychev spent his youth in Strazhitsa where he finished high-school. At the age of seventeen, he published his first poem "Orel" in the school's literary magazine. After working a few years in the municipality, he left his native town to enroll in Sofia University where he studied chemistry. In 1928, he eventually graduated in diplomacy from the University of National and World Economy in Sofia.

== Literary career ==
Karaliychev published his first major work, the revolutionary poem „Mauna loa“ in 1923. This was followed the year after by his first collection of short stories "Ruj" and, after that, by his first novel for children Mecho in 1925. A co-editor in several chief literary journals from the period, he also collaborated with the prominent leftist magazine "Nov Put" where he worked with fellow writers Assen Razcvetnikov, Nikola Furnadzhiev, and Georgi Tsanev. These young man formed the "September Four", a prominent group that introduced leftist ideas to the Bulgarian literature of the interwar period. After being condemned for bourgeoisie writers by fellow BCP member Georgi Bakalov in 1924, the September Four ended their collaboration with "Nov Put" and joined the literary magazine "Zlatorog" under editor Vladimir Vassilev.

Karaliychev continued to write short stories, tales, and children books and collect legends and fairy tales of various folklore traditions until his death.
