= Geo Milev =

Bulgarian poet, translator and journalist

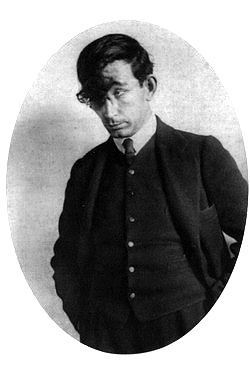
- Born: Georgi Milev Kasabov; January 15, 1895; Radnevo, Bulgaria
- Died: May 15, 1925 (aged 30); Sofia
- Occupations: Translator, poet, journalist
- Spouse: Mila Keranova (married 1919–1925)
- Children: Leda, Bistra
- Parent(s): Milyo and Anastasia Milevi
- Writing career
- Notable work: Septemvri

Geo Milev (Note: Bulgarian: Гео Милев) (born Georgi Milev Kasabov; (Note: Bulgarian: Георги Милев Касабов) 15 January [O.S. 3 January] 1895 – 15 May 1925) was a Bulgarian poet, translator, and journalist. He is perhaps best known for his epic poem Septemvri, written during the Bulgarian September Uprising.

== Life ==
Geo Milev was born Georgi Milev Kasabov in Radne mahale, today Radnevo, the first son in the family of school teachers Milyo (Note: Bulgarian: Мильо) and Anastasia (Note: Bulgarian: Анастасия) Kasabovi. In 1897 the family moved to Stara Zagora, where his father started a publishing business in 1907. Geo Milev attended the town's high school from 1907 to 1911 before he went on to study at the Faculty of Philology of Sofia University. From 1912 Geo Milev continued his education at the Faculty of Philosophy of Leipzig University, where he was introduced to German Expressionism. On 30 July 1914, two days after the outbreak of the First World War, he traveled from Leipzig to London, where he spent several months sightseeing and improving his English and met the Belgian Symbolist poet Émile Verhaeren. On returning to Germany, Geo Milev was detained in Hamburg on 18 October 1914 on suspicion of being an English spy. He was released after eleven days and returned to Leipzig, where he worked on his university thesis on Richard Dehmel. On 8 August 1915 he returned to Bulgaria without having obtained a degree. Beginning in 1916 he fought in World War I, where he was severely injured. After recuperating in Berlin he began to collaborate with the magazine Aktion. Upon his return to Bulgaria he started to publish the Bulgarian modernist magazine Везни (Scales), in Sofia. He contributed to the publication as a translator, theatre reviewer, director and editor of anthologies.

== Death ==
On May 15, 1925, in the course of government reprisals following the St Nedelya Church assault, Geo Milev, a member of the Bulgarian Communist party, was taken to a police station for a "short interrogation" from which he never returned. His fate remained unknown for 30 years. In 1954 during the trial of General Ivan Valkov and a group of former police and military executioners, one of the defendants confessed how victims of the 1925 purge had been executed and where they were buried. Geo Milev had been strangled with wire and then buried in a mass grave in Ilientsi, near Sofia. His skull was found in the mass grave. His body was identified by the glass eye he was wearing after he lost his right eye in World War I.

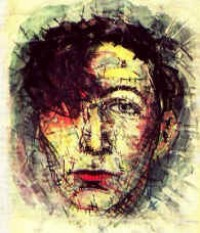
Self-portrait 1918

== Family ==
His daughter was the writer and diplomat Leda Mileva.

== Works ==
He published his most famous poem September in his magazine Пламък (Flame) in 1924. It describes the brutal suppression of the Bulgarian uprising of September 1923 against the military coup d'état of June 1923.

=== Selected bibliography ===
- Milev, Geo, September, Brussel, 1984

In Bulgarian

- Жестокият пръстен (1920), The Cruel Ring
- Експресионистично календарче за 1921 (1921), A Little Expressionist Calendar for the Year 1921
- Панахида за поета П. К. Яворов (1922), The Commemoration Ceremony for the Poet P. K. Javorov
- Иконите спят, (1922), The Icons Sleep

== Honour ==
Milev Rocks in the South Shetland Islands, Antarctica are named after Geo Milev.
