= Nikola Furnadzhiev =

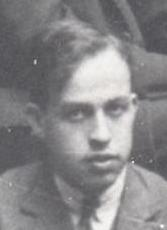
- Furnadzhiev in the mid 1920s
- Born: 27 May 1903; Pazardzhik, Bulgaria
- Died: 26 January 1968 (aged 65); Sofia, Bulgaria
- Writing career
- Genre: poetry

Nikola Yoradnov Furnadzhiev (Bulgarian: Никола Йорданов Фурнаджиев; May 27, 1903 – January 26, 1968) was a Bulgarian poet and translator.

== Childhood and early years ==
Nikola Furnadzhiev published for the first time some of his poems in the literary journal "K'vo da e" in 1918. He continued writing for the journal under the pseudonyms Merry Man and Grandpa Luka. He began working with the literary journal "Student's Thought" in 1919.

Furnadzhiev graduated from the high school in Chirpan in 1922. The same year he enrolled as a student in the Medical Department of Sofia University. However, he soon transferred from the department to study natural sciences. Finally, he transferred again to study philosophy, in which he majored. He graduated in 1930.

== Works ==
=== 1920-1944 ===
Furnadzhiev wrote some of his best works for the literary journal "Nov Put" edited by Georgi Bakalov. During his years of collaboration with "Nov Put", he worked with writers Assen Razcvetnikov, Angel Karaliychev, and Georgi Tsanev together with whom he formed the "September Four", a prominent literary group that introduced leftist ideas to the Bulgarian literature of the interwar period. He collected and published the poems, which first appeared in "Nov Put", in his first collection of poems "Spring Wind" in 1925. He also wrote his influential poem "Svatba" in the same year.

Furnadzhiev broke his association with "Nov Put" because of his pro-Communist convictions when members of the BCP condemned the September Four for advancing values and ideas of the bourgeoisie in their works. He joined the journal "Zlatorog" in 1924. He published his second collection of poems, "Rainbow", in 1928.

After graduating, Furnadzhiev worked as a teacher in the Third High-School for Boys in Sofia and soon afterwards he worked in the Ministry of Culture. He moved to Istanbul to teach in a Bulgarian school there in 1933. In these years abroad, he wrote and published his collection of children stories "Golden Branches". Furnadjiev returned to Bulgaria in 1938. He taught in his hometown Pazardzhik. He became a teacher in the Second High School for Girls in Sofia in 1922.

=== After 1944 ===
After the changes in 1944 Furnadzhiev began working for the Ministry of Propaganda.

He became editor in chief for the literary newspaper "Literary front" in 1945. He then became editor in chief of the publishing company "Bulgarian writer" where he was the chair of the Department of Poetry in 1949. During the early 1960s he worked as editor of the literary journal "September" where he worked until his retirement in 1963.

In the 1950s and 1960s, Furnadzhiev published five collections of poems: "Days of Glory", "I walked your roads", "Selected Poems", "Sun above the Mountains" and "The Most Difficult Thing". He also published collections of poems for children: "Free Homeland", "Brave Pioneers" and "Night at the Camp". He experimented writing récit de voyage. Among these works are "Among Friends" and "A Trip to Chili".

Furnadzhiev was one of the best translators of Russian poetry. His works were translated into several languages in Europe.

== Works ==
- Spring Wind (1925)
- Rainbow (1928)
- Days of Glory (1950)
- I walked your roads (1958)
- The Most Difficult Thing (1964)
