= Leda Mileva =

Bulgarian poet and diplomat (1920–2013)

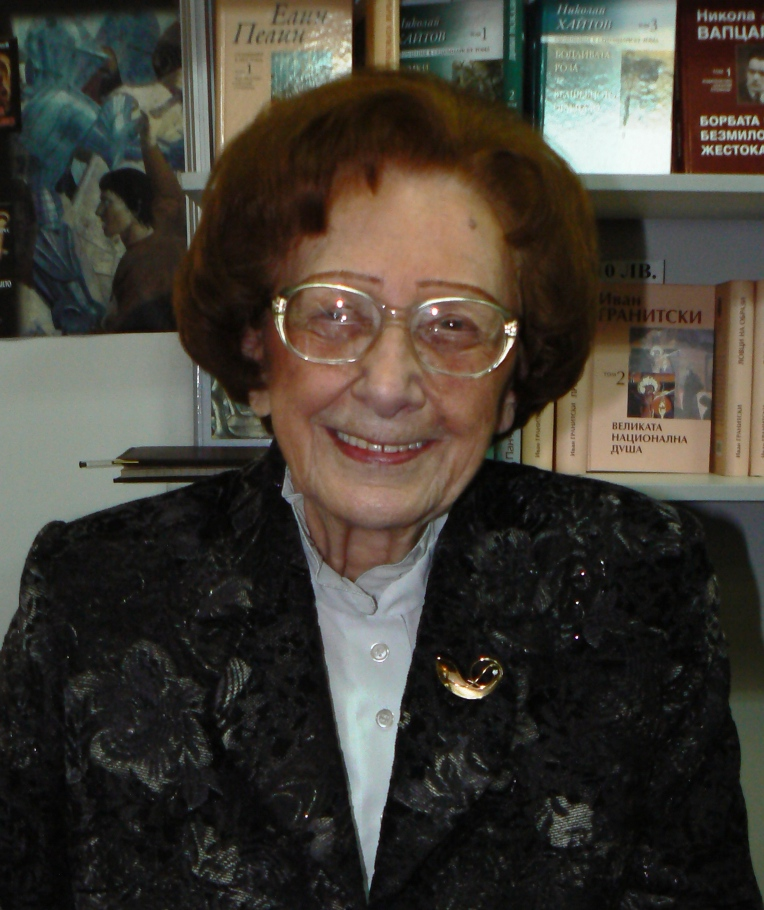
- Born: February 5, 1920 Sofia, Kingdom of Bulgaria
- Died: February 5, 2013 (aged 93) Sofia, Bulgaria
- Occupation: Editor, writer, translator, diplomat
- Genre: Poetry
- Notable awards: Kalina Malina (1987); Konstantin Konstantinov (2008)
- Spouse: Nikola Dimitrov (Died 1988); Nikolai G. Popov (Died 1990)
- Children: Emilia Dimitrova; Boyan Nikolaev

Leda Mileva (Bulgarian: Леда Милева) (5 February 1920 – 5 February 2013) was a Bulgarian writer, translator and diplomat. She was the daughter of Bulgarian poet Geo Milev.

Mileva was ambassador and resident representative of Bulgaria in UNESCO until 1978.
