= Georgi Bakalov =

Georgi Ivanov Bakalov (Bulgarian: Георгий Иванов Бакалов; 7 November 1873 – 14 July 1939) was a Bulgarian literary historian, critic and public figure.

== Biography ==
Bakalov was born on in Eski Zaara (now Stara Zagora), Ottoman Empire. He studied at the Plovdiv Boys' High School where he became chairman of the student society "Napredak". Bakalov was involved in a student protest in 1891, for which he was expelled from the high school. He later completed his studies in Geneva. In 1891 he joined the Bulgarian Social Democratic Party (BSDP). During his studies in Geneva (1891–1893) he became close to Georgi Plekhanov.

After returning to Bulgaria, he began printing in Sliven, where in 1893–1896 he published a number of pamphlets and his own translations of Marx, Engels, Plekhanov etc. He was a teacher for some time but was dismissed after which he devoted himself to political, journalistic and literary activities. In 1896, Bakalov was elected a delegate to the London Congress of the Second International. In 1897, he moved to Varna, where he founded a publishing house, translated and published the work The Communist Manifesto by Marx and Engels in Bulgarian.

In 1904, Bakalov again participated as a delegate to the Amsterdam Congress of the Second International. In 1905, he moved to Sofia and founded the publishing house "Knowledge". In 1920, he became a member of the newly founded Bulgarian Communist Party (TS).

Persecuted by the government of Alexander Tsankov, Bakalov became an emigrant to France in 1925 and then to the USSR in 1932, where he lived in Kharkiv and worked as an editor at the International Publishing House, Section of Bulgarian Writers. In the same year he was elected a corresponding member of the Academy of Sciences of the USSR.

Later that year he returned to Bulgaria, where he edited left-wing publications until his death on July 14, 1939.
