= Velikite Balgari =

Bulgarian television show

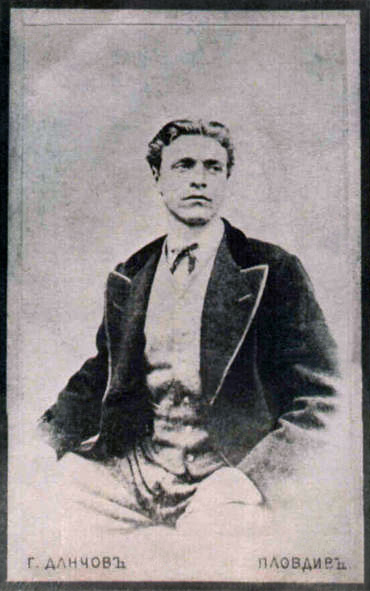
Vasil Levski at the time of the creation of his internal revolutionary network

Velikite Balgari (Bulgarian: „Великите българи“, The Great Bulgarians) is a Bulgarian spin-off of the 2002 BBC television program 100 Greatest Britons. Aired on the Bulgarian National Television's Kanal 1, its first stage began on 9 June 2006 and finished on 10 December, with a show on 23 December announcing the names of the Top 100 as chosen by popular vote. The Top 10 were announced in alphabetical order. In the second stage, which lasted until 17 February 2007, the viewers determined the order in the Top 10. Documentaries dedicated to every Top 10 personality were aired during the second stage.

== 1–10 ==
- Vasil Levski (1837–1873), revolutionary and national hero
- Peter Deunov (1864–1944), spiritual master of a school of Esoteric Christianity
- Asparuh of Bulgaria (d. 681), founder of the First Bulgarian Empire
- Tsar Simeon I of Bulgaria (c. 866–927), ruled during the Golden Age of Bulgarian culture and military power
- Hristo Botev (1848–1876), national poet and revolutionary
- Knyaz Boris I of Bulgaria (d. 907), ruled during the Christianization of Bulgaria
- Saints Cyril and Methodius (9th century), devised and spread the Glagolitic alphabet
- Stefan Stambolov (1854–1895), successful Prime Minister
- Ivan Vazov (1850–1921), national writer
- Saint Paisius of Hilendar (1722–1773), wrote Istoriya Slavyanobolgarskaya

== 11–100 ==
11. John Atanasoff (1903–1995) Physicist and inventor credited with inventing the first digital computer
12. Hristo Stoichkov (1966–) The greatest Bulgarian football player
13. Baba Vanga (1911–1996) claimed mystic
14. Todor Zhivkov (1911–1998) The communist leader of the People's Republic of Bulgaria (PRB) from 4 March 1954 until 10 November 1989.
15. Georgi Asparuhov (1943–1971) football player
16. Tsar Kaloyan of Bulgaria (1170–1207) Tsar of Bulgaria
17. Khan Krum of Bulgaria Khan of Bulgaria
18. Tsar Ivan Asen II of Bulgaria Emperor
19. Vladimir Dimitrov (1882–1960) painter
20. St John of Rila (876–946) The first Bulgarian hermit
21. Azis (1978–) Chalga singer
22. Ivan Kostov (1949–) 47th Prime Minister
23. Aleko Konstantinov (1863–1897) writer, known for Bay Ganyo
24. Volen Siderov (1956–) politician
25. Georgi Benkovski (1843–1876) revolutionary
26. Neno Yurukov (1978 -) physics teacher at 91 German Language High school
27. Slavi Trifonov (1966–) actor and singer
28. Nikola Vaptsarov (1909–1942) poet, communist and revolutionary, shot to death at 32 because of his revolutionary ideology
29. Boyko Borisov (1959–) 50th Prime Minister of Bulgaria
30. Lili Ivanova (1939–) singer
31. Dan Koloff (1892–1940) wrestler and mixed martial artist
32. Khan Kubrat
33. Tonka Obretenova (1812–1893) revolutionary
34. Georgi Rakovski (1821–1867) freemason and writer
35. Petko Voyvoda (1844–1900) haydut leader and freedom fighter
36. Rayna Knyaginya (1856–1917) teacher and revolutionary
37. Valya Balkanska (1942–) folk music singer
38. Georgi Dimitrov (1882–1949) communist politician
39. Albena Denkova (1974–) ice dancer
40. Ghena Dimitrova (1941–2005) operatic soprano
41. Evlogi (1819–1897) merchant, banker and Hristo Georgiev
42. Atanas Burov (1875–1954) banker and politician
43. Kolyu Ficheto (1800–1881) architect and sculptor
44. Emil Dimitrov (1940–2005) singer
45. St Evtimiy, Patriarch of Tarnovo Patriarch of Bulgaria
46. Tsar Samuil of Bulgaria Tsar of the First Bulgarian Empire
47. Aleksandar Stamboliyski (1879–1923) Prime Minister
48. Georgi Partsalev (1925–1989) film actor
49. Zahari Stoyanov (1850–1889) writer and historian
50. Nikolay Haytov (1919–2002) fiction writer
51. St Clement of Ohrid (840?–916) saint and scholar
52. Veselin Topalov (1975–) chess Grandmaster
53. Yordan Yovkov (1880–1937) writer
54. Gotse Delchev (1872–1903) revolutionary figure
55. Peyo Yavorov (1878–1914) Symbolist poet
56. Rayna Kabaivanska (1934–) opera singer
57. Khan Tervel of Bulgaria Khan of Bulgaria
58. Ahmed Dogan (1954–) politician of Turkish descent
59. Hadzhi Dimitar (1840–1868) voivode and revolutionary who wrote for the Liberation of Bulgaria from Ottoman rule.
60. Tsar Boris III of Bulgaria (1894–1943) Tsar of Bulgaria
61. Neshka Robeva (1946–) former Rhythmic Gymnast and coach
62. Nevena Kokanova (1938–2000) film actress
63. Boris Christoff (1914–1993) opera singer
64. Yordan Radichkov (1929–2004) writer and playwright
65. Yane Sandanski (1872–1915) national hero
66. Dimitar Peshev (1894–1973) Deputy Speaker of the National Assembly of Bulgaria and Minister of Justice
67. Elin Pelin (1877–1949) writer, best narrator of country life
68. Vasil Aprilov (1789–1847) educator
69. Apostol Karamitev (1923–1973) actor
70. Georgi Parvanov (1957–) 3rd President of Bulgaria from 2002 to 2012
71. Dimcho Debelyanov (1887–1916) poet
72. Zahari Zograf (1810–1853) painter
73. Panayot Volov (1850–1876) revolutionary
74. Sergey Stanishev (1966–) President of the Party of European Socialists since November 2011 and Member of the European Parliament
75. Simeon Sakskoburggotski (1937–) Last reigning Bulgarian monarch
76. Lyudmila Zhivkova (1942–1981) politician, art historian
77. Dimitar and Konstantin Miladinovi (1810–1862 and 1830–1862, respectively) poets and folklorists
78. Stefan Karadzha (1840–1868) national hero
79. Nicolai Ghiaurov (1929–2004) opera singer
80. Stoyanka Mutafova (1922–2019) actress
81. Capt. Dimitar Spisarevski (1916–1943) fighter pilot
82. Lyuben Karavelov (1834–1879) writer
83. Stefka Kostadinova (1965–) athlete who competed in high jump
84. Hristo Smirnenski (1898–1923) poet and prose writer
85. Major General Georgi Ivanov (1940–) military officer and first Bulgarian cosmonaut
86. Petar Beron (1799–1871) educator
87. Valeri Petrov (1920–2014) poet
88. Georgi Kaloyanchev (1925–2012) actor
89. Geo Milev (1895–1925) poet and journalist
90. Sophronius of Vratsa (1739–1813) cleric
91. Ekaterina Dafovska (1975–) Biathlete, the only Bulgarian who won a gold medal at Winter Olympics
92. Dimitar Talev (1898–1966) writer
93. Todor Aleksandrov (1881–1924) freedom fighter
94. Pencho Slaveykov (1866–1912) poet
95. Filip Kutev (1903–1982) composer
96. Krakra of Pernik feudal lord
97. Ivet Lalova (1984–) Bulgarian athlete, sprint events
98. Panayot Hitov (1830–1918) hajduk and voivode
99. Khan Omurtag of Bulgaria Great Khan
100. Prof. Asen Zlatarov (1885–1936) biochemist

== See also ==
- 100 greatest Britons
- Greatest Britons spin-offs
- List of Bulgarians
