= Matey Preobrazhenski =

Bulgarian revolutionary and Orthodox priest

- Матей Преображенски
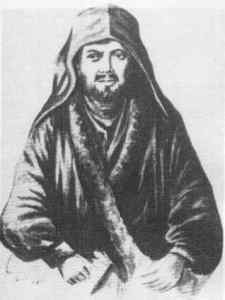
- Matey Preobrazhenski
- Born: 1828
- Died: 1 March 1875 (aged 46–47)
- Education: Dryanovo Monastery

Father Matey Preobrazhenski (Bulgarian: Матей Преображенски, "Matthew of the Transfiguration"; 1828–1 March 1875) was the clerical name of Mono Petrov Seizmonov (Моно Петров Сеизмонов), nicknamed Mitkaloto ("The Wandering One"), Ochmatey or Ochkata, a Bulgarian Orthodox priest, revolutionary, enlightener and a close friend of Vasil Levski.

Father Matey was born in the village of Novo Selo near Veliko Tarnovo in 1828; his two brothers and sister died at an early age. Orphaned at age nine, he went to the Dryanovo Monastery to study tailoring. In 1846, he became a neophyte in the same monastery and a monk in the Transfiguration Monastery in 1848. In 1851, he visited the monasteries on Mount Athos and after a one-year stay went to Varna, Tulcea, the Holy Trinity Monastery near Tarnovo and the Troyan Monastery. He returned to Mount Athos in 1856 and remained there until 1861. He took an interest in reading and studied the books in the monastical libraries; he was also interested in mechanics and attempted to build a sea mill on the coast of the Aegean Sea. However, his secular interests were not approved by the brothers of Mount Athos and left the peninsula after a fight; he used a boat to reach the island of Thasos.

In the following years, Matey Preobrazhenski travelled to Istanbul, Jerusalem, Russia, Bessarabia and Wallachia. In 1862, he cast off the cassock and joined the First Bulgarian Legion in Belgrade, Serbia. In the following year he headed a small detachment which entered Bulgaria, fought an Ottoman detachment and won. In the same year he was actively involved in social work: he became a priest again and travelled around the region of Veliko Tarnovo as a preacher and book vendor: besides spreading hagiographies and other Christian books, he also carried patriotic books such as Istoriya Slavyanobolgarskaya, O Asenu Pervago, etc. He supported the local population by appointing village teachers, founding community centres (chitalishta), producing theatrical plays, organising agricultural associations, issuing own books, etc.

In 1869, Matey Preobrazhenski accompanied Vasil Levski on his tour across Bulgaria. Thanks to Father Matey's good relations with the locals, the two were able to establish a number of revolutionary committees, part of Levski's Internal Revolutionary Organisation. From that point on, Father Matey took an active part in the revolutionary work by carrying the organisation's secret mail and weaponry and accompanying Levski and Angel Kanchev on their journeys. In his native village of Novo Selo he built a committee inn to be used by the organisation's members. After Levski's capture and death in 1873, Matey Preobrazhenski continued to work for the Liberation of Bulgaria. He died on 1 March 1875 in his native village, before he could see the work of his life completed with the April Uprising of 1876 and the Russo-Turkish War of 1877–1878.
