= Angel Kanchev =

Bulgarian revolutionary

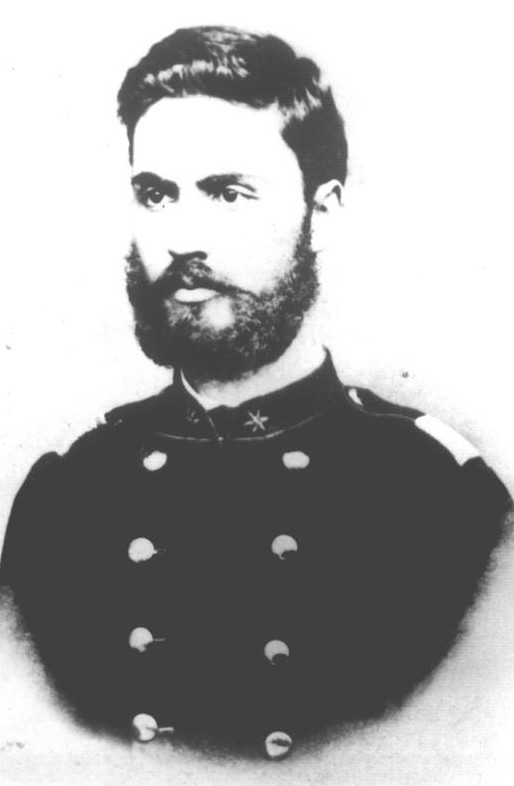
- Born: c. 1850; Tryavna, Ottoman Empire
- Died: 5 March 1872; Rousse, Ottoman Empire

Angel Kanchev Angelov (Bulgarian: Ангел Кънчев Ангелов) (c. 1850 – 5 March 1872) was a Bulgarian revolutionary from Tryavna.

Kanchev was born in about 1850 in the family of a master-builder. At first he studied in his hometown Tryavna and then in Ruse under the guidance of people like Petko Slaveykov and Dragan Tsankov. Kanchev continued his education at the Bolhrad school in Bessarabia and later he attended a military school in Serbia. During the time spent in Serbia he participated in the Second Bulgarian Legion in Belgrade alongside revolutionaries like Vasil Levski and Panayot Hitov. After the dismantle of the Legion Kanchev settled in Romania where he released in newspaper Dunavska zora a Proclamation in which he summons the Bulgarian people to start a revolution against the Ottoman oppressors. During 1870 and 1871 he studied in the Agriculture-industrial school in Tábor, Bohemia. After his return to Bulgaria Kanchev started working on a farm near Ruse, but did not give up on his revolutionary ideas. He was appointed deputy of Vasil Levski by the Bulgarian Revolutionary Central Committee. In August 1871 Kanchev met with Levski in Lovech and was ordered to start agitating among the people of Northern Bulgaria so that they prepare for a future rebellion. For a relatively short period of time the young revolutionary performed important tasks. However, after an unsuccessful attempt to enter Romania on 5 March 1872, he killed himself to avoid capture by the Ottomans. His last words are: "Long live BULGARIA".

A monument of Angel Kanchev now stands in Ruse, Bulgaria near the location of his death. He is further honored by being the namesake of the University of Ruse, as well as numerous schools and streets all over Bulgaria. His home in the Bulgarian city of Tryavna is now a museum, dedicated to him.
