= Petar Kunchev =

Petar Kunchev Петър Кунчев
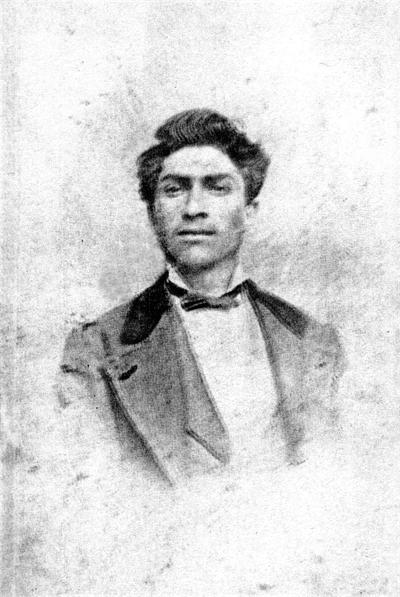
- Born: Petar Ivanov Kunchev; 1844; Karlovo (Karlıova), Ottoman Bulgaria
- Died: 1881 (aged 37); Karlovo, Principality of Bulgaria
- Occupation: Revolutionary
- Known for: Internal Revolutionary Organisation

Petar Ivanov Kunchev (Bulgarian: Петър Иванов Кунчев; 1844–1881), was a Bulgarian revolutionary and brother of Vasil Levski. He was the youngest son in the family of Ivan and Gina Kunchevi. Kunchev was acting participant in the Bulgarian National Liberation Movement.

Petar leaves Karlovo, with the help of the Russian Vice-Consul Naiden Gerov goes to Constantinople. From there, he was transferred to Wallachia with a Russian passport.

The revolutionary participates in the struggles of the Bulgarians for liberation, being one of the first volunteers in Hristo Botev's libration's cheta. After the cheta was broken down, together with his comrade Kostadin Dimitrov from Sliven, he escaped and hided in Sofia. He was persecuted by Ottoman authorities. From 1877 he participates in Bulgarian Volunteer Corps. Kunchev participated in the battles at Kazanlak, Stara Zagora and Nova Zagora. For his services to the Fatherland, Peter Kunchev was appointed senior guard in Karlovo. In this position, in 1881, he died of tuberculosis.
