= Filip Totyu =

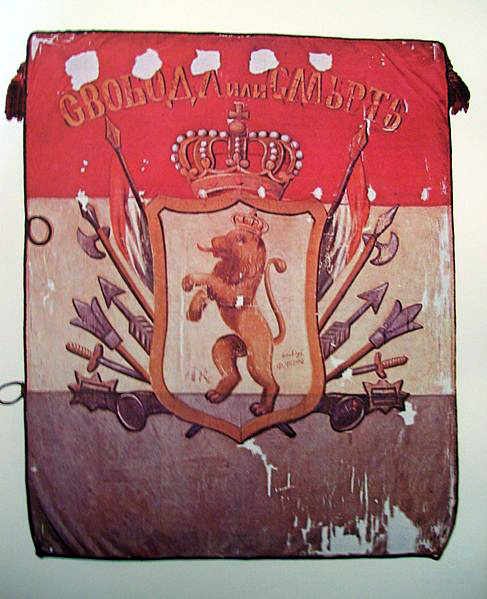
Flag of Filip Totyu's band bearing a Bulgarian coat of arms and the inscription "Freedom or death"

Todor Todorov Topalov (or Topalski) (Bulgarian: Тодор Тодоров Топалов or Топалски; 1830-23 March 1907), better known under the pseudonym Filip Totyu (Филип Тотю), was a Bulgarian revolutionary of the Bulgarian National Revival period and the voivoda of an armed band of volunteers.

Totyu was born in the hamlet of Gartsite, today part of the village of Voneshta Voda, near Kilifarevo, Veliko Tarnovo Province, to the family of a cattle dealer. He studied in Tarnovo in 1840 and engaged in trade after 1842. Around 1850, he had a conflict with the Ottoman authorities which forced him to flee into the Balkan Mountains with a group of friends and become a hajduk. His band's area of operation were the regions of Tarnovo, Elena and later also Nova Zagora. Although he was captured and interned in the Tarnovo and Sliven prisons several times, he managed to escape and return to his hajduk activities, leading to the Ottomans announcing a big reward for his head. After escaping the Sliven prison in 1863, Totyu moved to Wallachia, where he actually adopted that name to cover his tracks.

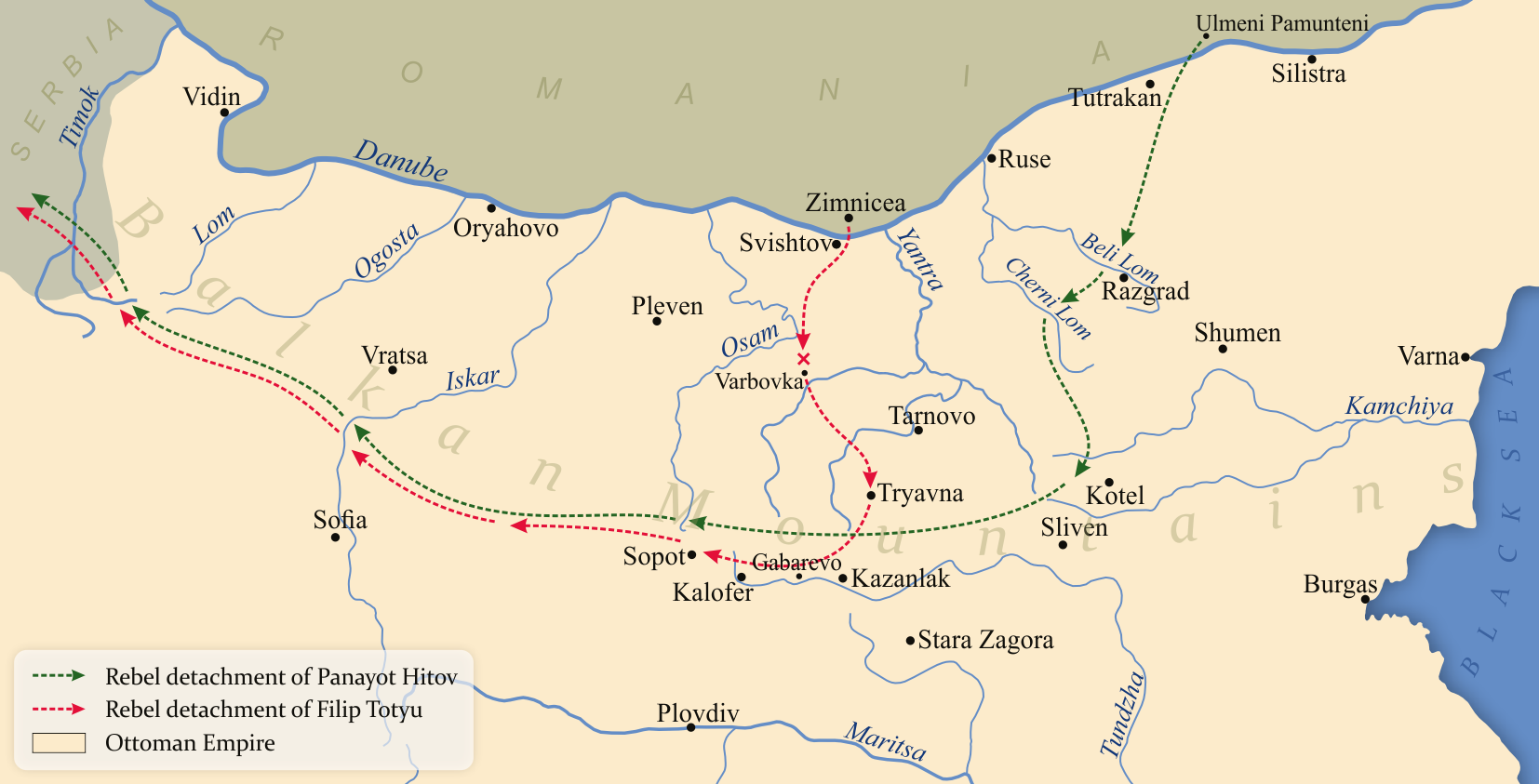
Actions of the rebel detachments of Panayot Hitov and Filip Totyu in 1867.

In Wallachia, he got to know Georgi Rakovski and came to realize the need for an organized struggle against the Ottoman rule. On 17 May 1867 he crossed the Danube at Svishtov with a band of 35, with the intention reach the Balkan Mountains and join forces with Panayot Hitov's band which had moved into Bulgaria on 29 April. In Svishtov, the band was joined by several other volunteers and proceeded to move southward. In a forest at Varbovka, near Sevlievo, however, Totyu's detachment was surrounded by Ottoman military units and bashi-bazouks, with one volunteer reportedly facing 60 Turks. During the night, the survivors fled into the mountains, where, near what is today Botev Peak, Totyu and four of his men managed to meet Hitov's remaining forces and head to Serbia, where they participated in the Second Bulgarian Legion. Afterwards Totyu lived in Romania, constantly persecuted and arrested and forced to move to Russia, where he lived for longer and received a state pension. In 1875, at the time of the Herzegovinian rebellion, Hristo Botev was sent to Southern Russia by the Bulgarian Revolutionary Central Committee to collect funds and recruit Bulgarian emigres and Filip Totyu in particular. He agreed to participate in a Bulgarian uprising and left for Romania, but the suppression of the Stara Zagora Uprising meant his idea to aid the revolutionaries with a band was thwarted. In 1876 he aided the Serbs in the Serbo-Turkish conflict and invaded northwestern Bulgaria with his detachment, but he was repulsed and returned to Russia, only to participate in the Russo-Turkish War of 1877-78, which led to the Liberation of Bulgaria.

After the Liberation, Totyu lived in the village of Dve Mogili, Rousse Province, where he engaged in agriculture and received a small military pension. He died on 22 March 1907. Totyo's home in Voneshta Voda and his last home in Dve Mogili are both museums, dedicated to him.
