= Monument to Vasil Levski, Sofia =

Coordinates: 42°41′47.98″N 23°20′6.94″E

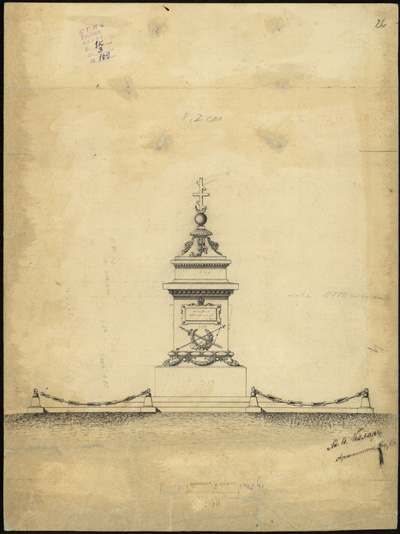
Design of the Vasil Levski Monument, 1878, by architect Antonín Kolář

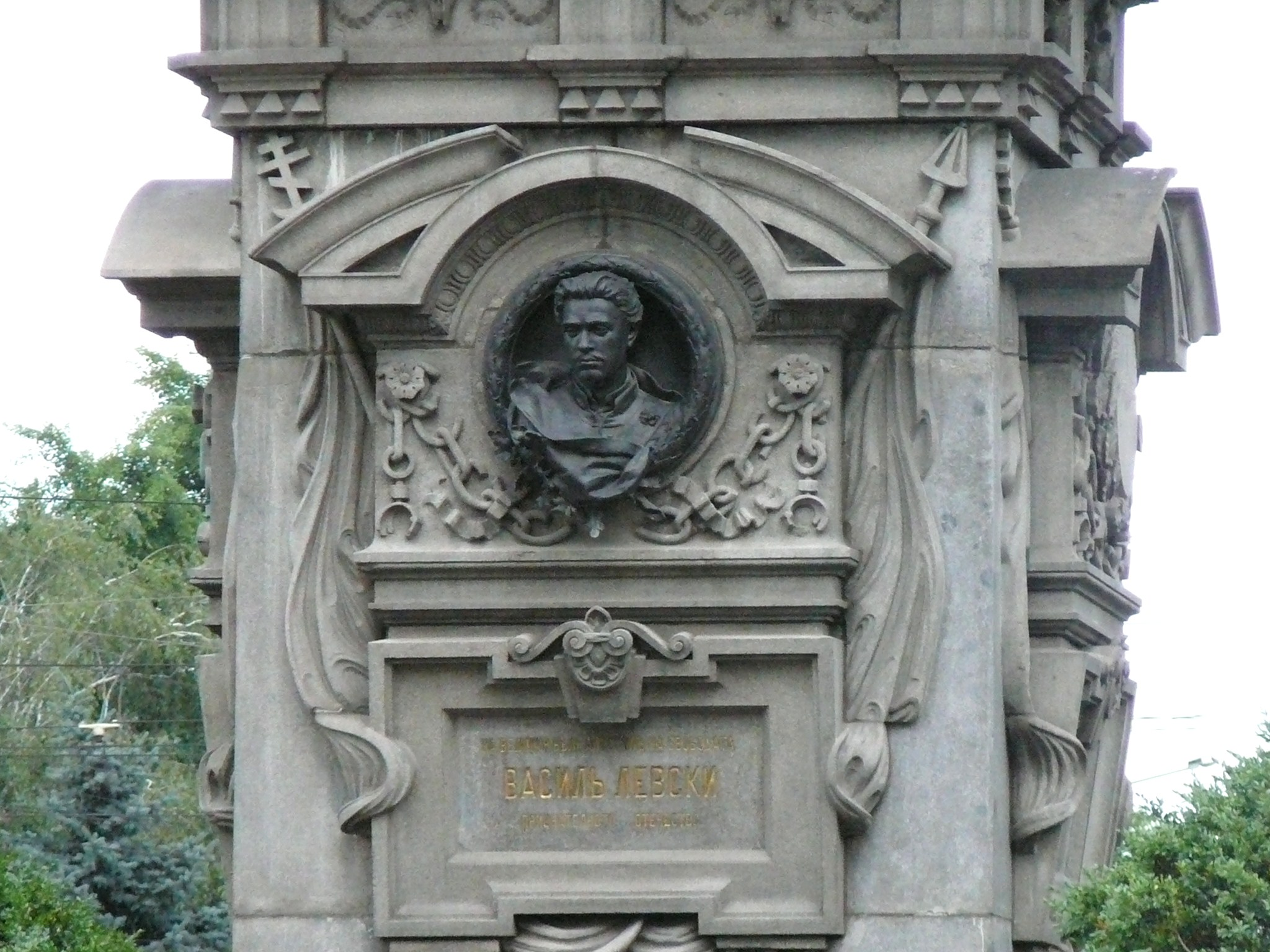
The Monument to Vasil Levski in Sofia, Bulgaria

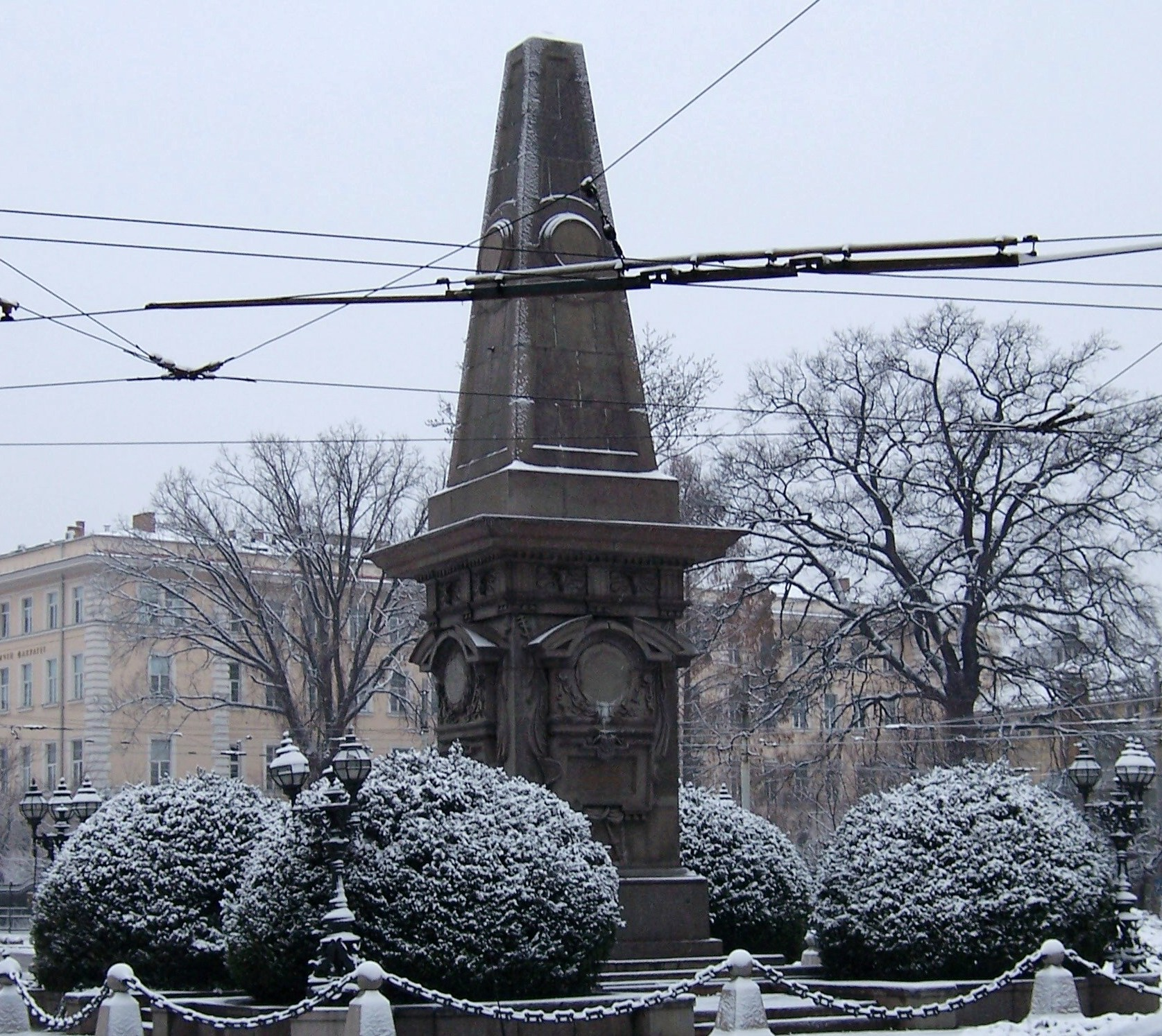
The Monument to Vasil Levski in Sofia, Bulgaria

The Monument to Vasil Levski (Bulgarian: Паметник на Васил Левски, Pametnik na Vasil Levski) in the centre of Sofia, the capital of Bulgaria, is one of the first monuments to be built in the then newly liberated Principality of Bulgaria. It commemorates the hanging of Bulgarian national hero and major revolutionary figure Vasil Levski on the same spot on 18 February 1873.

The monument is 13 m high, made of grey Balkan granite and designed by Czech architect Antonín Kolář. The bronze bas-relief of the head of Levski, part of the monument, was created by Josef Strachovský (or, according to other sources, Austrian sculptor Rudolf Weyr), whereas Italian Abramo Peruchelli did the stonecutting work. It was inaugurated on 22 October 1895, but was planned and worked on ever since the Liberation of Bulgaria in 1878, the construction being hindered by a chronic lack of funds and negligence, and taking a whole 17 years. This ignited a wave of indignation among the Bulgarian intellectuals of the time, with the poet Konstantin Velichkov even branding this carelessness in an 1881 poem (see text).

A draft for the monument featured a large Christian cross over a crescent, but it was rejected as religiously intolerant and incompatible with Levski's proper beliefs in equality and tolerance.
