= Stefan Dichev =

Stefan Dichev (Bulgarian: Стефан Дичев; February 9, 1920; Veliko Tarnovo – January 27, 1996; Sofia) was a Bulgarian writer and prolific author. Lawyer by education.

Dichev is best known for his historical novels. He wrote the screenplay for the famous film "The way to Sofia" dedicated to the 100th anniversary of the Liberation of Bulgaria.
