= Bulgarian Legion =

Bulgarian nationalist military legion

- Българска легия
- The standard of the Bulgarian Legion
- Leader: Georgi Stoykov Rakovski
- Dates active: 1862–1868
- Headquarters: Belgrade, Serbia
- Ideology: Bulgarian nationalism
- Wars: National awakening of Bulgaria

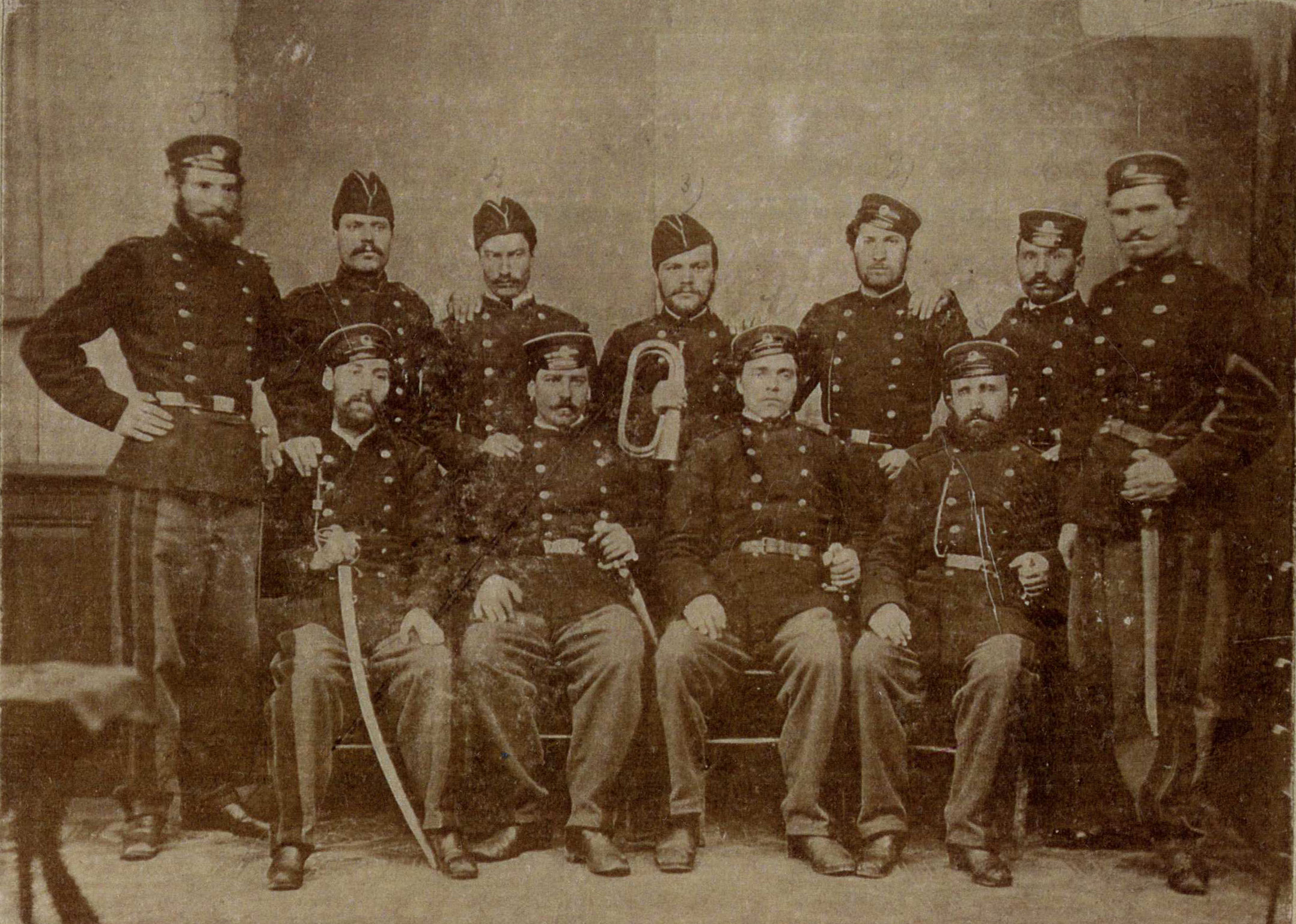
Participants in the Second Bulgarian Legion (1867–1868). Vasil Levski is the third from the left on the first row

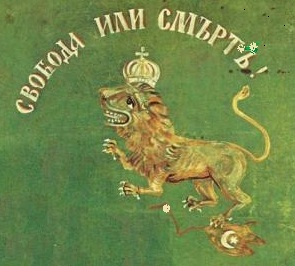
Another banner used by the legionaries.

The Bulgarian Legion (Bulgarian: Българска легия, romanized: Bŭlgarska legiya, Serbian: Бугарска легија, romanized: Bugarska legija) was the name of two military bands formed by Bulgarian volunteers in the Serbian capital of Belgrade in the second part of the 19th century. Their ultimate goal was the liberation of the Bulgarian people from Ottoman rule through coordinated actions with the neighbouring Balkan countries.

== First Bulgarian Legion ==
The First Bulgarian Legion (Първа българска легия) was established in 1862 by Georgi Stoykov Rakovski in agreement with the Serbian government. At the time Montenegro was at war with the Ottoman Empire and Serbia itself was planning to join the conflict. According to the initial plan, in case of war between Serbia and the Ottoman Empire, the Legion would cross the border and enter the Bulgarian lands, where it would instigate an uprising among the population.

In order to sustain direct contact with the Serbian government, the so-called Provisional Bulgarian Command was established on the initiative of Rakovski. His Plan for the Liberation of Bulgaria inspired Bulgarians and some six hundred young people responded to his appeal to create the Legion, many of them emigrants and refugees in Romania. Among them were Vasil Levski, Stefan Karadzha, Vasil Drumev, Dimitar Obshti, Matey Preobrazhenski and other figures that later came into national prominence.

The support of the Legion was taken care of by the Serbian government. The members had to go through some military training so as to be able to participate in the future uprising and in the expected conflict between Serbia and the Ottoman Empire. According to Trotsky, when the Turkish forces entered Belgrade, the Bulgarian legion distinguished itself in the fighting. However the conflict ended swiftly and the subsequent Constantinople Conference decided that not all Ottoman troops should withdraw from Serbia. Due to pressure from the Ottoman Empire the Serbian authorities requested the Legion to be disbanded. As a result, on 21 September 1862 the participants were expelled from Belgrade.

== Second Bulgarian Legion ==
The Second Bulgarian Legion (Втора българска легия) was founded in 1867, as relations between Serbia and the Ottoman Empire once again worsened and the Serbian authorities began preparing for war and organizing the First Balkan Alliance. This was used by the Band of Virtues (Добродетелна дружина), who concluded an agreement with Serbia to establish a Bulgarian military school in Belgrade to instruct military leaders for a future uprising in Bulgaria.

This time the expenditures were paid by Russia, the volunteers being trained by Serbian officers. The surviving rebels from the bands of Panayot Hitov and Filip Totyu joined the Legion, as well as young people from Bulgaria and the Bulgarian diaspora in Romania.

However, the expected war between the two countries never broke out due to the Ottoman authorities' engagement with the suppression of the Cretan Revolt (1866–1869) and reluctance to further complicate its relations with Serbia. Meanwhile, the government of Jovan Ristić, which opted for reconciliation with the Ottomans, came into office in Serbia. The Second Bulgarian Legion lost its usefulness to the Serbians as a result of this. It was disbanded in April 1868 despite the opposition of the Russian diplomats, its members being expelled from Serbia.

== Historical experience ==
The experience of the two Legions showed the Bulgarian Legionnaires that the formation of an insurrectionary centre to manage the Bulgarian liberational movement from the outside and particularly the binding of the national uprising's task with the politics of other states would always be exposed to danger. Nevertheless, the Legions were an excellent school that prepared a large number of the future Bulgarian leaders.
