= Bulgarian Revolutionary Central Committee =

Bulgarian revolutionary organisation

- Български революционен централен комитет
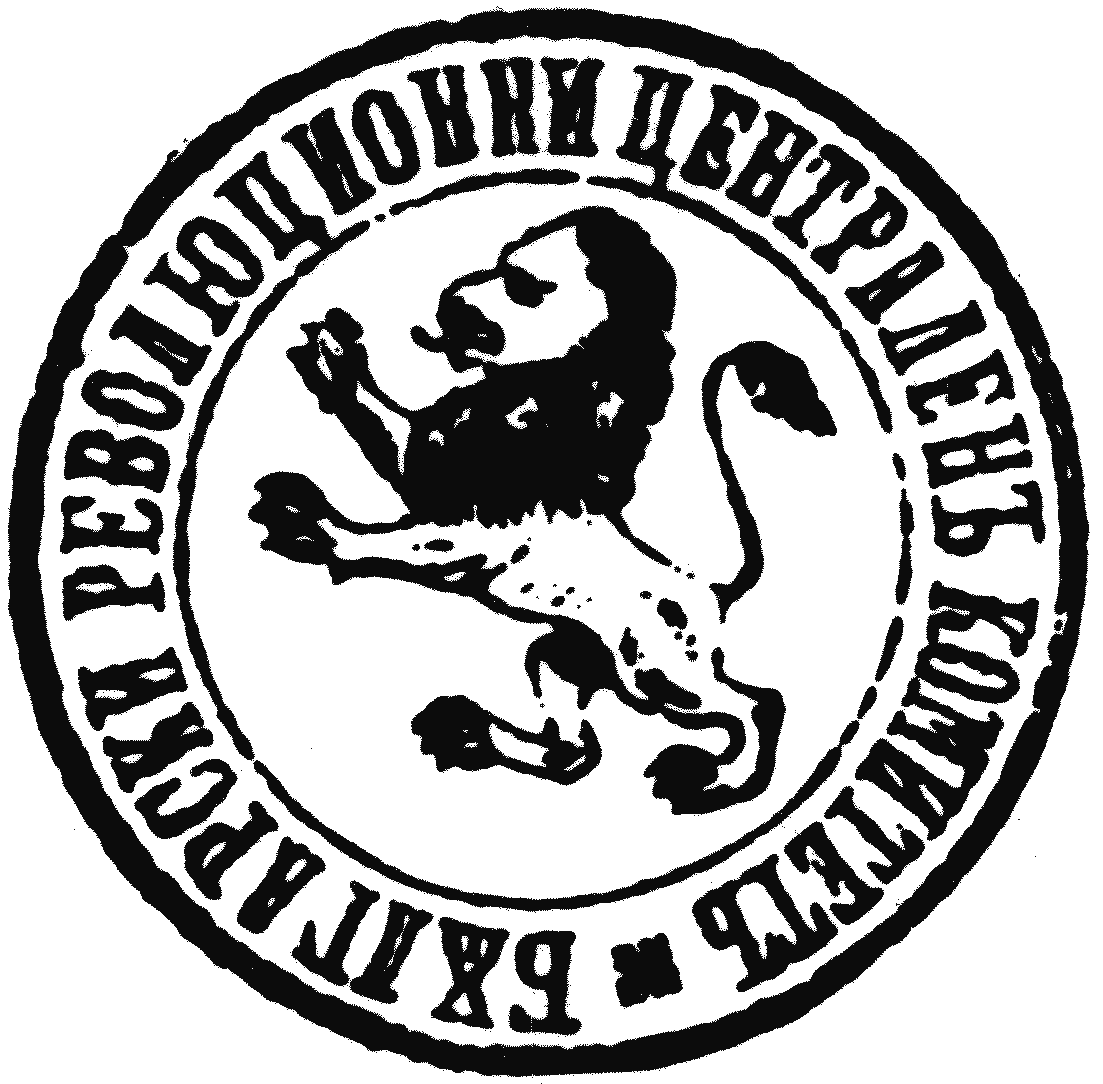
- Leaders: Lyuben Karavelov (1870-1875); Hristo Botev (1875-1876)
- Founded: 1866
- Dissolved: 1876
- Country: Principality of Romania
- Headquarters: Bucharest
- Newspaper: Svoboda
- Ideology: Bulgarian nationalism Democratic republicanism
- Part of: National awakening of Bulgaria

The Bulgarian Revolutionary Central Committee (BRCC; Bulgarian: Български революционен централен комитет (БРЦК), romanized: Balgarski revolyutsionen tsentralen komitet (BRTsK)) was a Bulgarian revolutionary organisation founded in 1866 by Georgi Rakovski, among the Bulgarian emigrant circles in the Principality of Romania. The decisive influence for the establishment of the committee was exerted by the Svoboda ("Freedom") newspaper which Lyuben Karavelov began to publish in the autumn of 1869. Some of the other revolutionaries who took active part in the formation and work of the BRCK were Panayot Hitov, Vasil Levski and Dimitar Tsenovich.

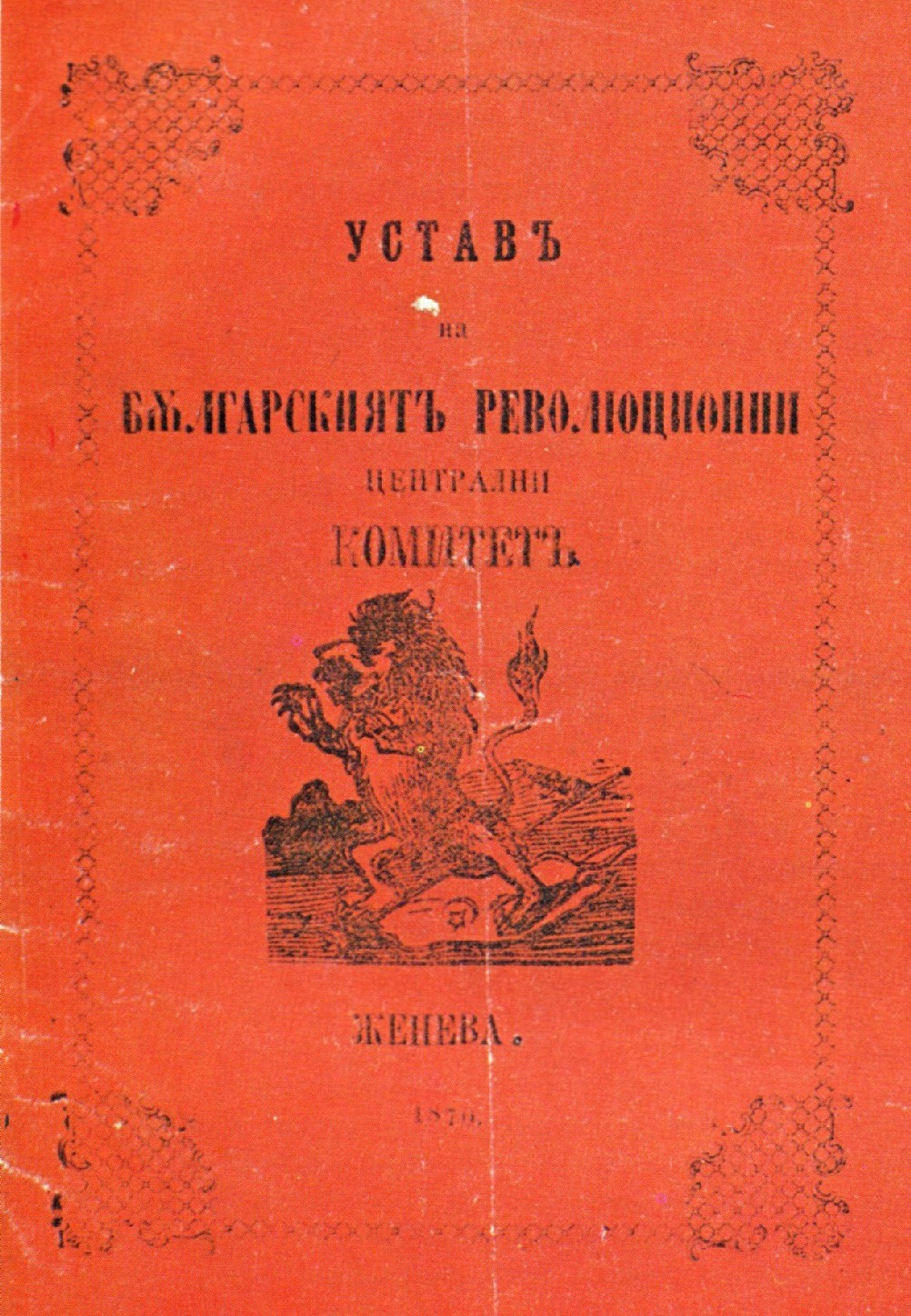
Statute of the Bulgarian Revolutionary Central Committee, cover, 1870

Karavelov was elected chairman of the BRCK in the spring of 1870. He also prepared the first programme of the organisation (promulgated in Geneva on 1 August 1870), which envisaged the liberation of Bulgaria through a nationwide revolution and the establishment of a democratic republic.

By the end of 1871, both Karavelov and Vasil Levski, the leader of the other Bulgarian revolutionary society–the Internal Revolutionary Organisation–knew that the future success of the armed struggle against the Ottomans depended on the co-operation of both emigration and local committees. To this end, the two organisations prepared and adopted a joint programme and charter and voted on the merger of the two organisations under the name of BRCK at a general meeting held in Bucharest in May 1872. The charter of the joint organisation represented a compromise between the ideas of both Levski and Karavelov.

The committee network of the organisation in Ottoman Bulgaria expanded considerably after the general meeting and the preparation of the uprising was well advanced, when a faction in BRCK led and initiated by Dimitar Obshti attacked a convoy of the Ottoman postal service near Sofia in order to procure money for ammunition. The robbery caused the exposure of a number of committee activists in the region of Sofia and eventually resulted in the capture and hanging of Vasil Levski on 18 February 1873.

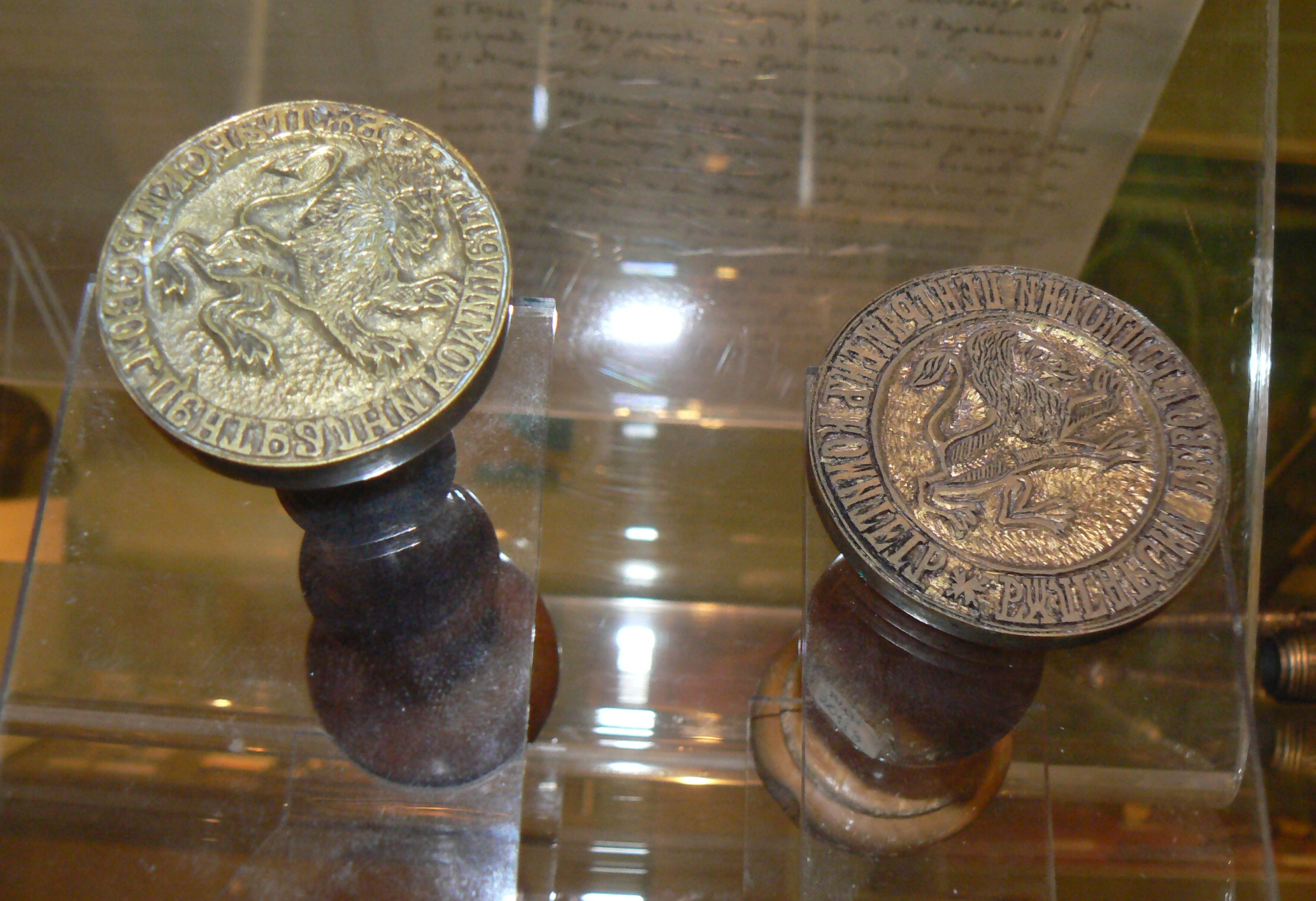
Seals of the BRCC, 1870s (copies in National History Museum).

The dissolution of the committee network around Sofia and the death of Levski dealt a hard blow to BRCK and its work. The attempt to find a successor to Levski was unsuccessful, the Svoboda newspaper was banned by the Romanian authorities and Karavelov was forced to flee Romania for fear of being extradited to the Ottoman Empire. In 1874 Karavelov tried to regain control of the organisation at its second general meeting held in Bucharest but the other delegates passed censure on him and he left the organisation in March 1875.

Karavelov was replaced as chairman of the BRCK by Hristo Botev, a revolutionary, poet and editor of the Zname (Flag) newspaper. In August 1875, the faction around Botev organised a third general meeting of the organisation which took a decision on a general uprising in Bulgaria in September the same year. The time for preparation of the insurrection was, however, insufficient and only the regional committee in Stara Zagora managed to organise a small-scale rebellion, quickly crushed by the Ottoman police. The failure of the uprising and the accusations of misappropriations of money which ensued forced Botev to resign. The organisation disbanded itself shortly afterwards, to assemble again in November 1875 in the town of Giurgiu where a decision on another general uprising was taken (see also April Uprising).

== See also ==
- Internal Revolutionary Organisation
- Macedonian Secret Revolutionary Committee
