= Internal Revolutionary Organization =

- Вътрешна революционна организация
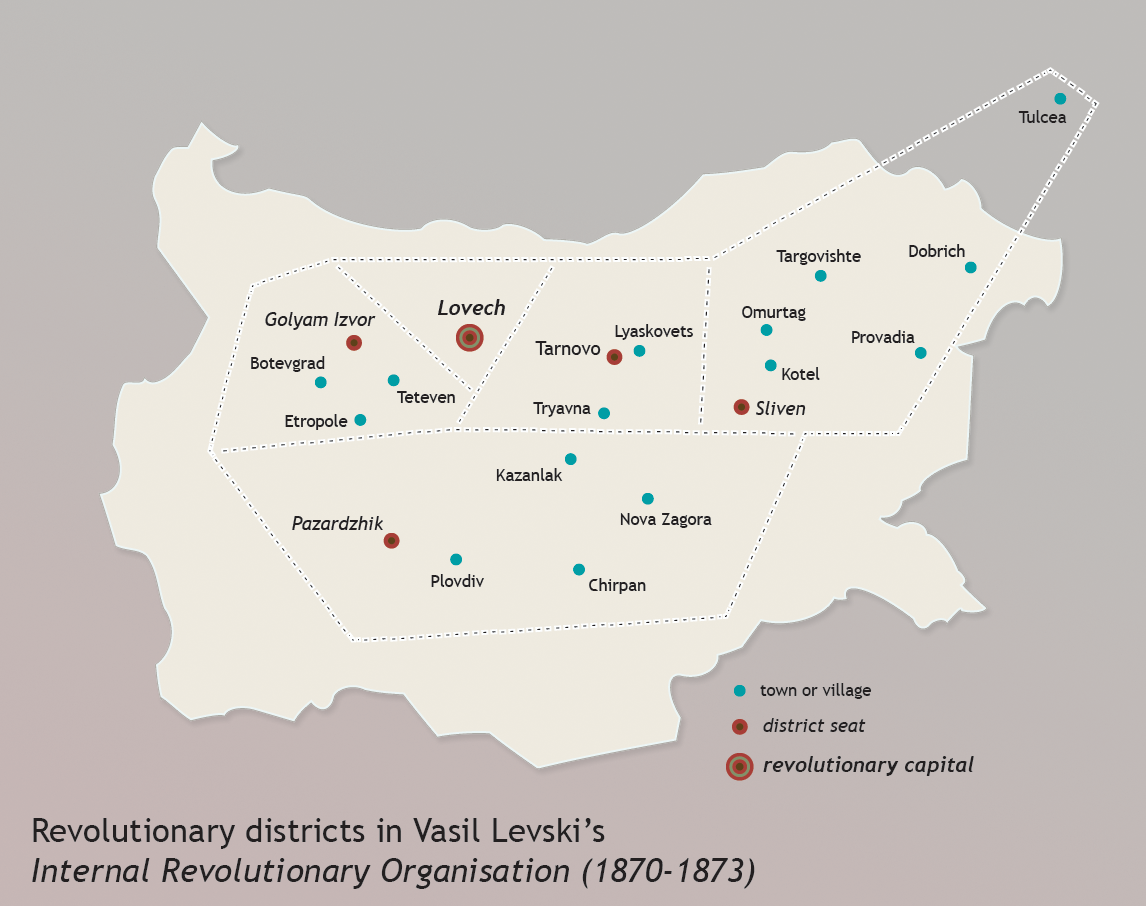
- Map of the revolutionary districts in Vasil Levski's Internal Revolutionary Organisation
- Leader: Vasil Levski
- Founded: 1869
- Dissolved: 1872
- Merged into: Bulgarian Revolutionary Central Committee
- Country: Bulgaria
- Headquarters: Lovech
- Ideology: Bulgarian nationalism Democratic republicanism
- Part of: National awakening of Bulgaria

The Internal Revolutionary Organisation (IRO; Bulgarian: Вътрешна революционна организация (ВРО), romanized: Vatreshna revolyutsionna organizatsia (VRO)) was a Bulgarian revolutionary organisation founded and built up by Bulgarian revolutionary Vasil Levski between 1869 and 1871. The organisation represented a network of regional revolutionary committees which were governed by a Central Committee in the town of Lovech. The foundation of IRO reflected Levski's ideas that the centre of revolutionary activity be transferred from the Bulgarian emigrant circles in Romania to Bulgaria proper. In 1871 Levski prepared the Charter of the organisation in the spirit of his own political views: liberation of Bulgaria from the Ottomans through a nationwide revolution and establishment of the country as a democratic republic with guarantees for the equality of all of its citizens regardless of their ethnicity or religion.

By the end of 1872, both Levski and Lyuben Karavelov, the chairman of the Bulgarian Revolutionary Central Committee (BRCC), which was situated in Bucharest, had concluded that the future success of the armed struggle against the Ottomans depended on the co-operation of both: external and internal committees. To this end the two organisations prepared and adopted a joint programme and charter and voted on the merger of the two organisations under the name of BRCK at a general meeting held in Bucharest in May, 1872. The goals and fundamental principles which governed the work of the Internal Revolutionary Organisation influenced the formation and guiding principles of subsequent Bulgarian revolutionary organisations, namely the Internal Macedonian-Adrianople Revolutionary Organisation (active in the Ottoman Empire from 1893 to 1912), the Internal Macedonian Revolutionary Organisation (active in Greek and Yugoslav Macedonia from 1919 to 1934), the Internal Thracian Revolutionary Organisation (active in Western Thrace from 1922 to 1934), the Internal Dobrudjan Revolutionary Organisation (active in Dobruja from 1923 to 1940) and the Internal Western Outland Revolutionary Organisation (active in the Western Outlands from 1921 to 1934).

== See also ==
- Bulgarian Revolutionary Central Committee
- Macedonian Secret Revolutionary Committee
- Vasil Levski

== Sources ==
- Historical dictionary of Bulgaria, Item 46 of European historical dictionaries, Scarecrow Press, Inc., 2006, ISBN 0-8108-4901-1, p. 228.
- Bones of Contention: The Living Archive of Vasil Levski and the Making of Bulgaria's National Hero, Maria N. Todorova, Central European University Press, 2008, ISBN 963-9776-24-6, PP. 276-278.
- The establishment of the Balkan national states, 1804-1920, Volume 8, A History of East Central Europe, Barbara Jelavich, University of Washington Press, 1986, pp. 136-137 ISBN 0-295-96413-8
