= Panayot Hitov =

Bulgarian revolutionary (1830–1918)

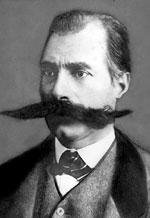
Panayot Hitov (1830–1918), Bulgarian revolutionary

Panayot Ivanov Hitov (Bulgarian: Панайот Иванов Хитов; 11 November 1830 – 22 February 1918) was a Bulgarian haidoutin, national revolutionary, and voivoda.

Born in 1830 in Sliven (known as İslimiye at the time), he became a haidoutin in Georgi Trankin's band of rebels in 1858. Two years later, after the death of Trankin, Hitov succeeded him as voivode of the band, which became one of the most active in southeastern Bulgaria. Some of his subordinates included Hadzhi Dimitar, Stoyan Papazov and Dyado Zhelyu. Around 1864–1865, Hitov began to regard his actions as part of the national liberation movement, and was in correspondence with Georgi Rakovski. In 1864, while in Serbia, he gathered band members among the Bulgarians in Kragujevac and Belgrade and moved to the region of Berkovitsa and Pirot. According to Rakovski's plan as presented in "1867 Provisional Law on the National and Forest Bands", Hitov was to be the chief Bulgarian voivode.

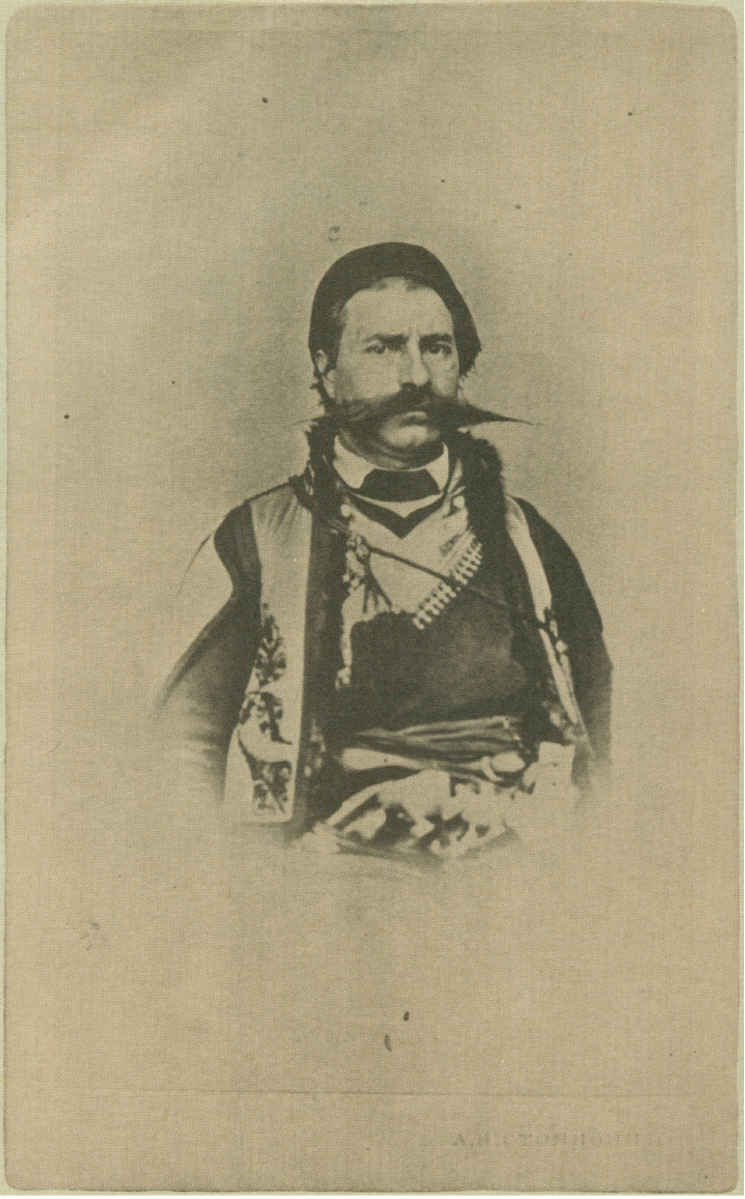
Panayot Hitov in 1867

Following Rakovski's death on April 28, 1867, Hitov entered Bulgaria from Romania at Tutrakan with a band of thirty, the band's standard-bearer being Vasil Levski. With his band, Hitov headed to the Balkan Mountains and spent some time around Kotel and Sliven. The goal of his band was not to organize an uprising, but to garner support among the Bulgarians for an organized resistance against Ottoman rule.

In August 1867, together with his band and that of Filip Totyu, Hitov headed to Serbia along the ridge of the Balkan Mountains. He settled in Belgrade, living there as a pensioner and becoming a supporter of the idea that Bulgaria's liberation struggle should be co-ordinated with Serbia's anti-Ottoman actions. Between 1869 and 1871, he expressed his views to Vasil Levski, with whom he kept up a correspondence. Without taking Levski's advice into consideration, he signed an agreement with the Montenegrin voivode Matanović to organize a joint uprising in Bulgaria, Bosnia, Herzegovina and Albania. In April 1872 Hitov became a member of the Bucharest branch of the Bulgarian Revolutionary Central Committee (BRCC).

After Levski's death in 1873, Hitov played an important role in the Bucharest committee, although he continued to live in Belgrade. In August 1875, he presided over the BRCC assembly which approved the proclamation of the Stara Zagora Uprising. According to the plan, Panayot Hitov was supposed to lead a band of soldiers, but this was not carried out due to the Serbian government's objections. Hitov was a leader in the Serbian-Turkish War of 1876 and the Russo-Turkish War of 1877–78. After the Liberation in 1878, Hitov lived in Rousse, taking part in local political life. In 1885, he headed the Unification of Bulgaria in his native Sliven. Later, due to his opposition to Stefan Stambolov's regime (1887–1894), he was sent to prison. He died on February 22, 1918, in Rousse.

== Honours ==
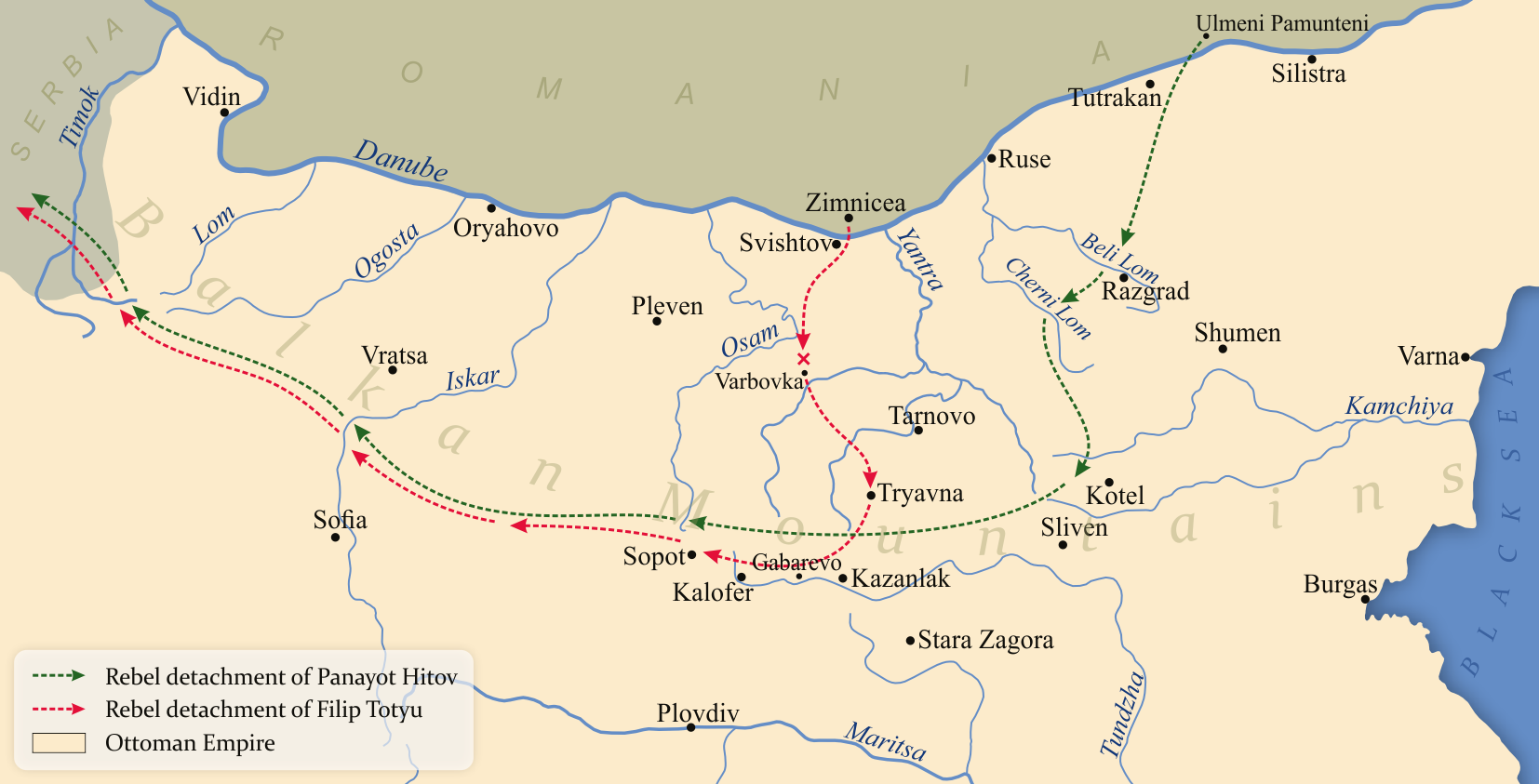
Actions of the rebel detachments of Panayot Hitov and Filip Totyu in 1867.

Hitov Spur on Oscar II Coast in Graham Land, Antarctica is named after Panayot Hitov. It is located 16.5 km northwest of Mount Quandary.

== In popular culture ==
Outside Bulgaria, Hitov is remembered for his characteristic moustache.
