= Georgi Sava Rakovski =

Bulgarian revolutionary and writer

Georgi Rakovski
- Георги Раковски
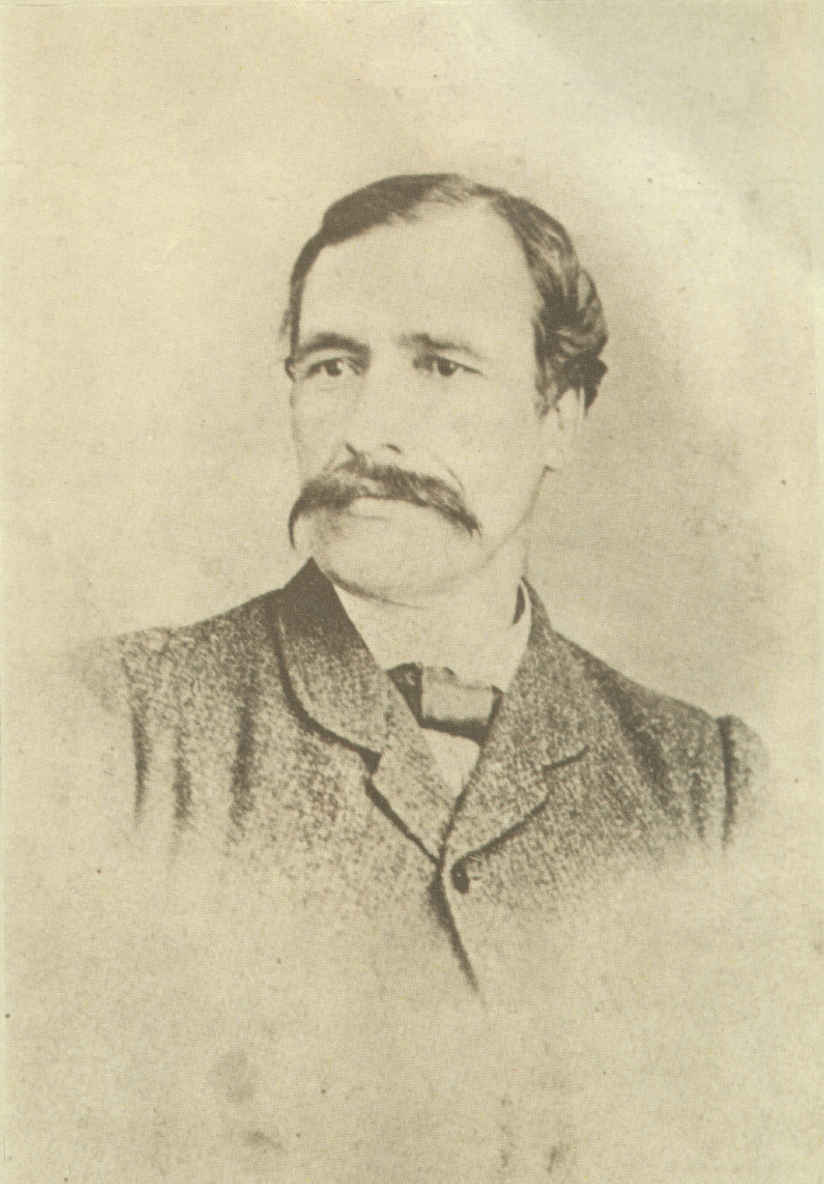
- Georgi Rakovski
- Born: Sabi Stoykov Popovich; Съби Стойков Попович (in Bulgarian); 14 April 1821; Kotel, Sanjak of İslimiye, Adrianople Eyalet, Ottoman Empire
- Died: 9 October 1867 (aged 46); Bucharest, United Principalities

Georgi Stoykov Rakovski (Bulgarian: Георги Стойков Раковски) (1821 – 9 October 1867), known also Georgi Sava Rakovski (Георги Сава Раковски), born Sabi Stoykov Popovich (Съби Стойков Попович), was a 19th-century Bulgarian revolutionary, freemason, writer and an important figure of the Bulgarian National Revival and resistance against Ottoman rule.

== Biography ==
=== Early life ===
He was born in Kotel to a wealthy and patriotic family. He attended monastery schools in his hometown and in Karlovo, and in 1837, went to study in the Greek Orthodox College in Constantinople. In 1841, he was sentenced to death whilst involved in revolutionary plans against the Turks, but thanks to a Greek friend, he managed to escape to Marseille. A year-and-a-half later, he returned to Kotel, only to be arrested again in 1845 and sent to Constantinople for seven years of solitary confinement. He was released in May 1848.

He decided to remain in Istanbul, where he worked as a lawyer and tradesman, and took part in campaigns for a Bulgarian national church. Rakovski was soon arrested once more, this time due to his creation of a secret society of Bulgarians to assist the Russians in the Crimean War. While being deported to Istanbul, he escaped, and gathered together a group of rebels. In June 1854, he was transferred to Bulgaria.

=== Literary work ===
Between 1854 and 1860, Rakovski spent his time writing, publishing reviews, and avoiding arrest. He also issued his own magazine "Bulgarian ancient times" ("Българска старина") 1865, which managed only one edition. In his article in it Rakovski cited all his sources in original for he could speak more than 9 languages and was the first European who translated the old vedic texts in Bulgarian. His wide interests and profound knowledge made him a really versatile rennaissane personality of the Bulgarian National Revival Movement in the mid 19th century.

He penned his best-known work, Gorski Patnik (translated as A Traveller in the Woods or Forest Wanderer), while hiding from Turkish authorities near the bulgarian city of Kotel during the Crimean War (1853–56). Considered to be one of the first Bulgarian literary poems, it was not actually published until 1857. The published version differed from the first version, in that it had a clearer plot and improved style.

The plot concerns a Bulgarian man who recruits a rebel group to mutiny against the Turks. Rakovski's aim in writing this was to awaken the people's spirit to fight for freedom and to take revenge on the Turks for their cruelty. The novel opens with the main character admiring the beauty of nature on the Bosporus. A preoccupation with national problems and lack of freedom clouds his mind, and he encourages others to join him in a revolt. As the insurgents travel toward Bulgaria, the reader takes in their courage and trials of the journey. The work is said to “unite all the ideology, hopes and beliefs” of the Bulgarian people in their brave fight against the yoke.

Rakovski left Gorski Patnik incomplete. Written in archaic language, it was difficult to read, but still had a great influence in society.

=== Revolutionary work ===
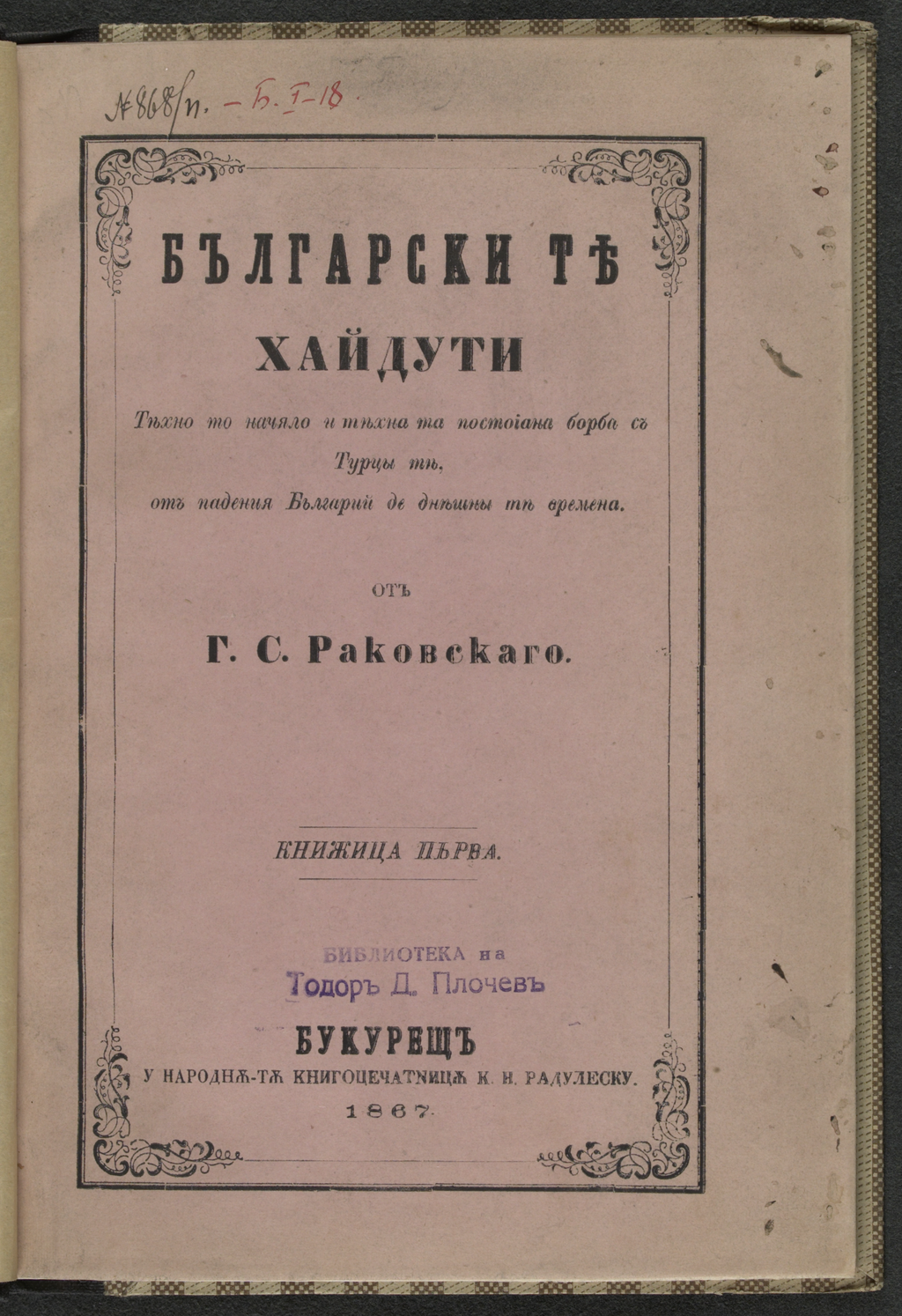
Bulgarian Haiduts, CE 1867, by Rakovski

1861 saw him organizing a Bulgarian legion in Belgrade, where he met voivode Đuro Matanović to negotiate a simultaneous rebellion in Bulgaria, Bosnia-Herzegovina, and Albania, and travelling through Europe recruiting support for his country's cause. While his radical views often met opposition from more moderate minds, his writings incited youth to go against the Turks. It was in this year that he wrote his Plan for the Liberation of Bulgaria. Many young people rallied under his flag to fight the Ottomans alongside the Serbs. However the conflict between Serbia and the Ottoman Empire was soon resolved and the legion was dissolved. During raids and recruiting G.S Rakovski stayed hidden at many addresses throughout the southern regions of Bulgaria. Rakovski moved to Bucharest, where he continued his journalistic and revolutionary activities.

Once there, he published a bilingual newspaper, Badushtnost. Rakovski was a supporter of Romania's reformist policies, and seeing potential, he began to support a union between Bulgaria and Romania. In Badushtnost, he appealed to good Bulgarian-Romanian relations and made reference to the Second Bulgarian Empire, in which both Bulgarians and Romanians lived together.

Led by the belief that Ottoman power could be brought down only with armed action, he began organizing small groups of revolutionary fighters, called cheti. Their aim was to instigate unrest in Bulgaria, thus motivating the population to fight the Ottomans. For the purpose of coordinating the armed resistance Rakovski and his followers founded the Bulgarian Revolutionary Central Committee - an organization which was yet to feature in the Bulgarian Liberation movement.

In 1867 the Committee equipped two bands (cheti) who penetrated Bulgaria led by Panayot Hitov and Filip Totyu. They fought battles with the Ottoman forces, but did not manage to fulfill their goals. Led by Hadzhi Dimitar and Stefan Karadzha, 120 chetnitsi entered Bulgaria in 1868 and fought their way to Stara Planina before being surrounded by the Ottomans. Some of the fighters, including Stefan Karadzha, were wounded, captured and later executed. The remaining men under the leadership of Hadzhi Dimitar were crushed at Buzludzha Peak in Stara Planina.

Georgi Rakovski died of tuberculosis in Bucharest on October 9, 1867.

== Honors ==
Rakovski Nunatak on Livingston Island in the South Shetland Islands, Antarctica is named after Georgi Sava Rakovski. Bolhrad High School is also named in his honor. An elementary school in Banja Luka, Republika Srpska, Bosnia and Herzegovina carries his name. Georgi Stoikov Rakovski Sarvodaya Kanya Vidyalaya in Defence Colony Delhi, a Government school in New Delhi, (India) also carries his name. 1 G. S. Rakovski street in Pliska, Bulgaria was named after Georgi Rakovski because it was considered a place of historical importance. It is believed that many plots were created in the goat shed which stood at the location prior to construction in 1933. The Georgi Rakovski Military Academy in Sofia is named after him.
