= Democratic republic =

Form of government

A democratic republic is a form of government operating on principles adopted from a republic and a democracy. As a cross between two similar systems, democratic republics may function on principles shared by both republics and democracies.

While not all republics are democracies, whether all democracies are republics depends on whether parliamentary monarchies are regarded as real monarchies or mere "crowned republics".

Common definitions of the terms democracy and republic often feature overlapping concerns, suggesting that many democracies function as republics, and many republics operate on democratic principles, as shown by these definitions from the Oxford English Dictionary:

- Republic: "A state in which supreme power is held by the people and their elected representatives, and which has an elected or nominated president rather than a monarch."
- Democracy: "A system of government by the whole population or all the eligible members of a state, typically through elected representatives."

Eugene Volokh of the UCLA School of Law observes that the United States exemplifies the varied nature of a constitutional republic—a country where some decisions (often local) are made by direct democratic processes, while others (often federal) are made by democratically elected representatives. As with many large systems, US governance is incompletely described by any single term. It also employs the concept, for instance, of a constitutional republic in which a court system is involved in matters of jurisprudence.

As with other democracies, not all people in a democratic republic are necessarily citizens, and not all citizens are necessarily entitled to vote. Suffrage is commonly restricted by criteria such as voting age, and sometimes by felony or imprisonment status.

== History ==
Historically, some inconsistency around the term is frequent. Prior to the American Revolution in what is now the United States—and before the coming of age of the "crowned republics" of constitutional monarchies in the United Kingdom and other European countries—democracy and republic were "used more or less interchangeably", Founding Father John Adams (writing in 1784) described democracy as follows: "No determinations are carried, it is true, in a simple or representative democracy, but by consent of the majority or their representatives". He personally favored a mixed government including elements of monarchy, aristocracy and democracy.

Taiwan claims to be the oldest of Asia's democratic republics, though its recent history of democratic process is largely linked only to Taiwan. Likewise, Africa's oldest democratic republic, Liberia (formed in 1822), has had its political stability rocked by periodic violence and coups.

== Global use of the term ==
Starting in the 20th century after World War II, many countries used the term "democratic republic" in their official names—most of which were Marxist–Leninist, or socialist, one-party states—that did not allow political opposition, free press or other democratic norms and institutions. These include states no longer in existence or who have changed their governmental systems and official names (almost all Marxist–Leninist): the German Democratic Republic (East Germany), the Democratic Kampuchea, the Somali Democratic Republic, the Democratic Republic of Vietnam (North Vietnam), the People's Democratic Republic of Yemen (South Yemen), the Democratic Republic of Afghanistan, and the People's Democratic Republic of Ethiopia. The Republic of India declares itself a "Sovereign, Socialist, Secular, Democratic Republic" in the Preamble to its Constitution.

As of October 2024, states which use the term "Democratic Republic" in their official names include many that do not hold free elections and have been rated as "undemocratic" or "unfree" by organizations that gave such ratings. Algeria, Democratic Republic of the Congo, Ethiopia, North Korea, and Laos do not hold free elections and are rated as undemocratic "hybrid regimes" or "authoritarian regimes" by The Economist Democracy Index. In addition, there are a few countries which use the term "Democratic Republic" in the name and have a good record of holding free or relatively free general elections and were rated "flawed democracy" or "full democracy" in the Democracy Index, such as the Democratic Republic of Timor-Leste (East Timor), the Democratic Republic of São Tomé and Príncipe, and the Democratic Socialist Republic of Sri Lanka.

== List of democratic republics ==
Countries with the title democratic republic in their name

=== Current democratic republics ===
- Democratic Republic of the Congo
- Democratic Republic of São Tomé and Príncipe
- Democratic Republic of Timor-Leste
- Sahrawi Arab Democratic Republic

==== Federal democratic republic ====
- Federal Democratic Republic of Ethiopia

==== People's democratic republics ====
- People's Democratic Republic of Algeria
- (North Korea) Democratic People's Republic of Korea
- (Laos) Lao People's Democratic Republic

==== Socialist democratic republic ====
- Democratic Socialist Republic of Sri Lanka

=== Historical democratic republics ===
- Democratic Republic of Afghanistan
- Democratic Republic of Bakassi
- Democratic Republic of Georgia
- Democratic Republic of Madagascar
- Democratic Republic of Sudan
- (North Vietnam) Democratic Republic of Vietnam
- (Yemen Arab Republic) Democratic Republic of Yemen
- Azerbaijan Democratic Republic
- (East Germany) German Democratic Republic
- Moldavian Democratic Republic
- (Somalia) Somali Democratic Republic

==== People's democratic republics ====
- Democratic People's Republic of Angola
- People's Democratic Republic of Ethiopia
- (South Yemen) People's Democratic Republic of Yemen

==== Democratic federative republics ====
- (Russian Republic) Russian Democratic Federative Republic
- Transcaucasian Democratic Federative Republic

==== Federal democratic republic ====
- Federal Democratic Republic of Nepal

==== Other states with 'democratic' in their name ====
- (Socialist Republic of Bosnia and Herzegovina) Democratic Bosnia and Herzegovina
- Democratic Kampuchea
- (Republic of Formosa) Democratic State of Taiwan
- Democratic Federal Yugoslavia
- Democratic Autonomous Administration of North and East Syria
- Democratic Government of Albania

== See also ==
- Democracy
- Democracy indices
- Federal republic
- Liberal democracy
- People's republic
- Republic
