= Liberation of Bulgaria =

Formation of a national identity in Ottoman Bulgaria

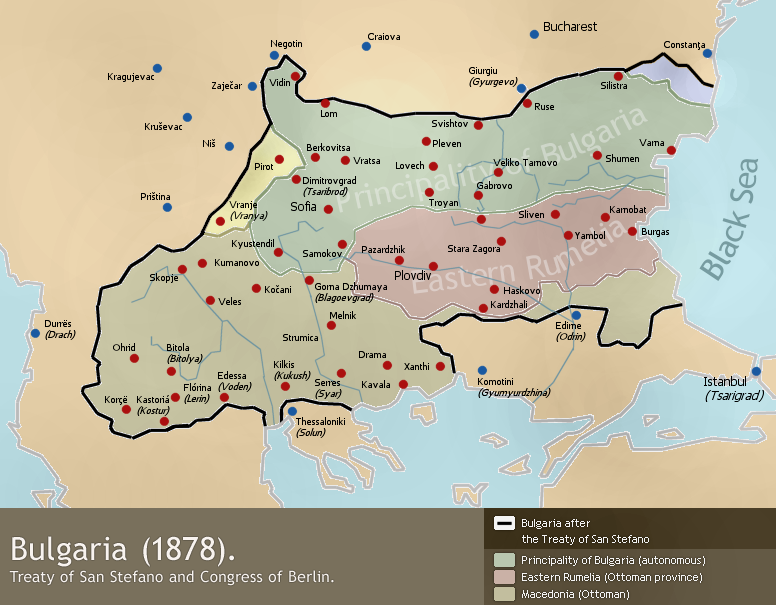
A map which shows the territories of the liberated Bulgarian tributary state in 1878 and its division in the same year with the adoption of the Treaty of Berlin

The Liberation of Bulgaria is the historical process as a result of the Bulgarian Revival. In Bulgarian historiography, the liberation of Bulgaria refers to those events of the Tenth Russo-Turkish War (1877–1878) that led to the re-establishment of the Bulgarian state under the Treaty of San Stefano of 3 March 1878. Today Bulgaria observes its National Liberation Day on 3 March.

== Treaties ==
The Treaty of San Stefano forced the Ottoman Empire to give back to Bulgaria most of its territory conquered in 14th century. At the Berlin Congress of the same year, the Treaty of Berlin was adopted, according to which the territories of the Bulgarian state, as established by the San Stefano treaty, were divided into three parts. The first part was the Principality of Bulgaria, which functioned independently but was nominally a vassal of the Ottoman Empire and was limited to Moesia and areas adjacent to the capital, Sofia.

The second part was to be an autonomous province of the Ottoman Empire—Eastern Rumelia. The third and largest part—all of Macedonia and Lozengrad—were restored to the Ottoman Empire, while some outlands were assigned to Serbia and Romania. Those territories seized from Bulgaria after the Congress of Berlin, including most of Macedonia, Thrace, and others, had a majority ethnic Bulgarian population.

== Unification and independence ==
On 6 September 1885, Eastern Rumelia became part of the Principality of Bulgaria after a bloodless unification. Although the principality was a de facto independent nation, it was de jure a vassal of the Ottoman Empire until 1908, when Bulgaria proclaimed its independence.

== See also ==
- Bulgarian National Awakening
