= Ivan Vedar =

- Born: 1827; Razgrad, Ottoman Empire
- Died: 1898 (aged 70–71); Rousse, Bulgaria
- Occupation(s): Freemason, polyglot, revolutionary

Ivan Vedar (Bulgarian: Иван Ведър), born Danail Nikolov, a.k.a. Yani Ingiliz, Johny English, Ovanes Efendi (equivalents of the name Ivan), Denkooglu (after Deniu, Danail), was born in Razgrad, Ottoman Empire in 1827. He is often referred to as the founder of freemasonry in Bulgaria. He was proficient in many Indo-European languages, Latin, and various Arabic dialects.

== Biography ==
During Danail's early years, his father, the architect Karastoyan, was requested to build a house for a local Turk, an important person. (Bulgaria was under Ottoman rule then.) The requester refused to pay, a row flared up with knives taken out, and, in order to save his father, Danail killed the Turk. What followed was a change of his name and life under cover. He studied in a college in Malta, where he picked up many languages, he worked as a sailor on an English ship, travelling between London and Melbourne, he was an interpreter in Turkish institutions in Tsarigrad, he taught languages in İzmir to the sons of Turkish notables (including Midhat Pasha). During the Crimean War he travelled over Black Sea harbours, possibly as a Russian spy. He continued his studies in the medical school in Bucharest, where he got his pseudonym Vedriy or Vedar (meaning cheerful) from the professors Dr Peter Protić and Dr Georgi Atanasović, because of his easy-going temper.

In 1863 in the Tsarigrad branch of Oriental Lodge he was initiated into masonry. He managed to reach the 33rd degree, the last one, according to the Old and Accepted Scottish Rite. An even more colourful lifestyle followed — he worked on the first Bulgarian railway Rousse–Varna, then as a trade representative in Manchester, he married the daughter of a respected architect from Rousse, he taught at Robert College, he was a correspondent for different European newspapers. Midhat Pasha appointed him a "secretary of the external correspondence", which lets him frequently keep in touch with foreign diplomats. He provided financial aid to some uprisings and the revolutionary movement in Rousse, among whose members he had already established friendly relations. He interceded for Zahari Stoyanov to become a librarian in the Zora cultural club. His lobbying lifted off the decision of Delaver Pasha to massacre a great part of the population in Rousse in 1877.

After the Liberation of Bulgaria, Ivan Vedar installed the first Bulgarian regular masonic lodge Balkan Star (French: Etoile des Balkans) in Rousse in 1880, among whose members are Nikola Obretenov, Zahari Stoyanov, Ilarion Dragostinov, Toma Kardzhiev, and which was visited incognito by the king-to-be Alexander Batenberg. Later, new lodges were founded in Varna (where the first Great lodge was located for a short time), Sofia, and some other cities, but in 1887 Vedar was forced to "put asleep" all lodges, because of the danger that their activity gets spoiled by political and interpersonal struggles, so common in the young and inexperienced country.

In the end of his life, he assigned all of his property to the state, saying he had given enough to his children — education and upbringing. The bones of Ivan Vedar were moved to the Pantheon of National Revival Heroes, and a monument in his honour was put nearby. Modern masonic organisations in Bulgaria issue a medal with his name.

== The event in Rousse in 1877 ==
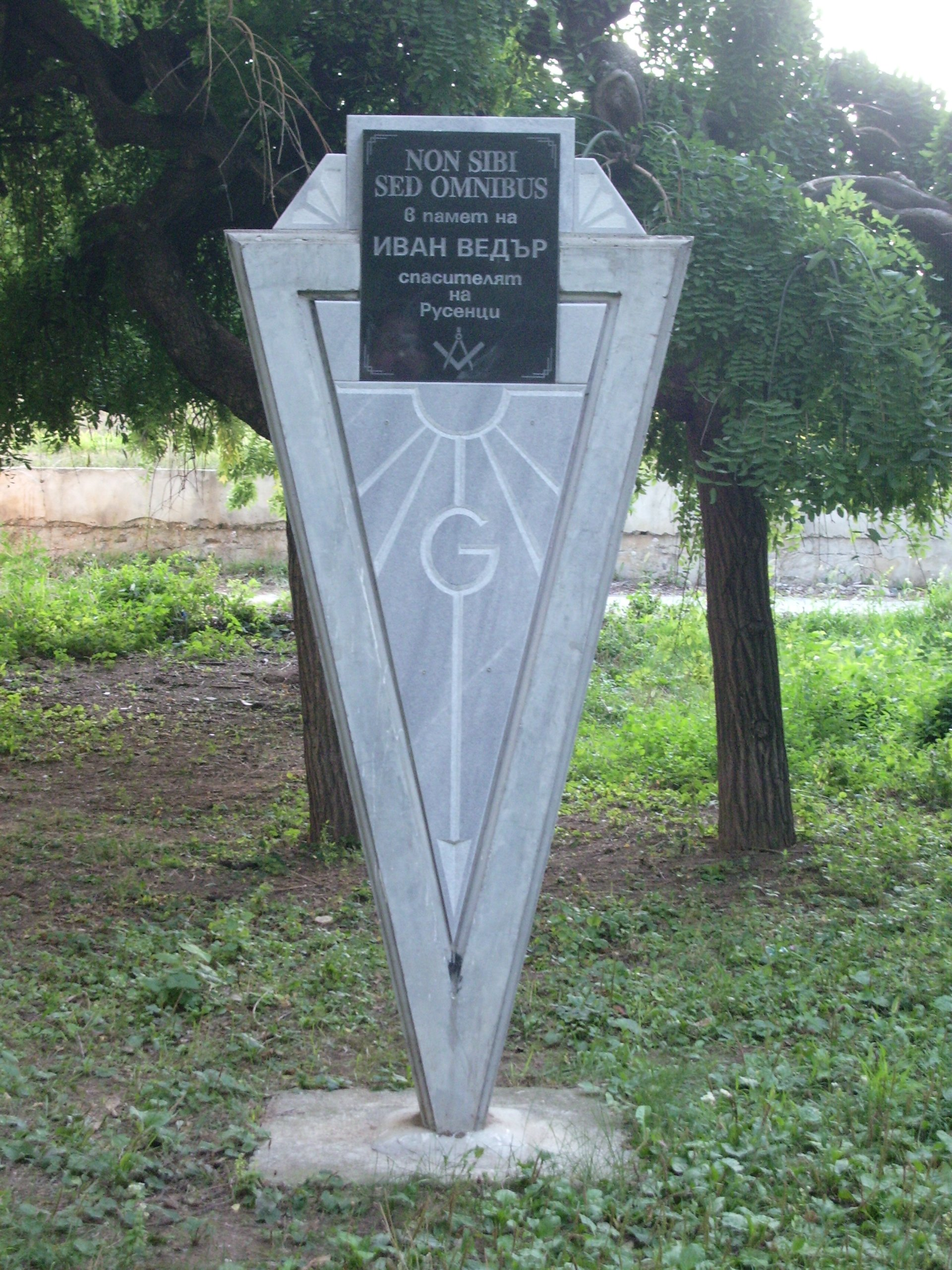
Ivan Vedar's monument

In the end of August, Russian forces fiercely attacked the Turkish quarter in Rousse, and almost completely razed it. That enraged the Turkish governors, wnho decided to massacre the whole Bulgarian population in Rousse — all of them were taken out in the field near the Vladikova Bahcha (the present Youth's Park), where they spent several days and nights. Vedar managed to slip out of his surrounded house by paying a bag of gold. He dropped in at the Italian consul Enrique de Gubernatis, together with whom they invited the influential Turk hajji Mehmed Alia to ascend with them to the Leventa hill, in order to lobby with Delaver Pasha, the commander of the Egyptian forces positioned around the city.

When they came in at the pasha's, the three of them made the masonic sign with a hand. Realizing that he was talking to a higher-ranking brother, he promised Ivan brotherly cooperation. When the delegation came down from Leventa, they found the population surrounded by the regular Egyptian army, which guarded them from the Cherkez and bashi-bazouk soldiers. The result was an exodus from a secure death for 4000 Rousse citizens and of setting the city ablaze.
