= Pantheon of National Revival Heroes =

Coordinates: 43°51′02″N 25°57′39.30″E

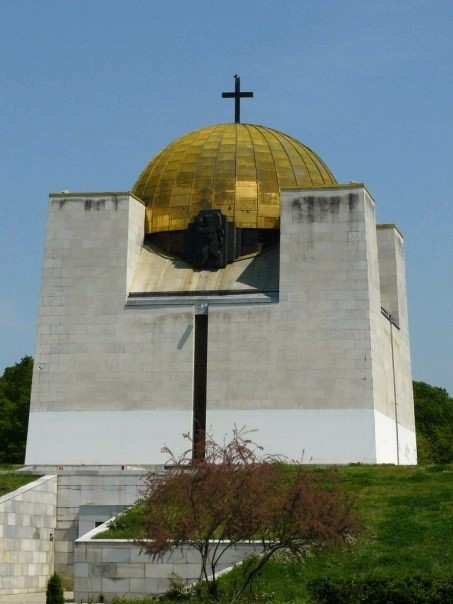

The Pantheon of National Revival Heroes (Bulgarian: Пантеон на възрожденците) is a Bulgarian national monument and an ossuary, located in the city of Rousse. The remains of 39 famous Bulgarians are interred there, including: Lyuben Karavelov, Zahari Stoyanov, Stefan Karadzha, Panayot Hitov, Tonka Obretenova, Nikola Obretenov, Panayot Volov, Angel Kanchev, and others; 453 other participants in Botev's detachment, the Chervena Voda detachment, in the April uprising, and other revolutionaries have been honored by inscription of their names in the interior. An eternal fire burns in the middle under the gold-plated dome. The Pantheon is one of the 100 Tourist Sites of Bulgaria.

In order to build the Pantheon in 1977, the "All Saints" church in the old Rousse cemetery was demolished. The new building was opened to visitors on 28 February 1978. After a public discussion in 2001, the Patheon was "Christianised" by placing a cross on top of its dome. The "St Paisius of Hilendar" chapel, as well as a museum exposition, were founded at that time.

== See also ==
- Vienna Secession, a similar building
