= Obretenov =

Obretenov is a surname.

A family of Bulgarian revolutionaries bear this name:

- Tonka Obretenova (1812–1893) Wife of Niho.
- Tiho Obretenov
  - Nikola Obretenov (1849–1939) Son of Tiho and Tonka.
  - Georgi Obretenov (after 1849–1876) Son of Tiho and Tonka.
  - Angel Obretenov (1837–1894) Son of Tiho and Tonka.
  - Petar Obretenov Son of Tiho and Tonka.
  - Anastasiya Stoyanov Daughter of Tiho and Tonka.
