= Georgi Izmirliev =

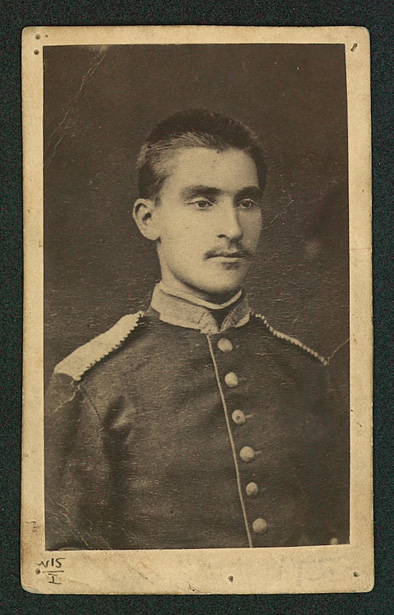
Georgi Izmirliev (1851–1876)

Georgi Dimitrov Izmirliev (Bulgarian: Георги Димитров Измирлиев; 21 April 1851 – 28 May 1876), nicknamed Makedoncheto ("The Little Macedonian"), was a Bulgarian revolutionary and public figure. A participant in the anti-Ottoman April Uprising of 1876, he was an assistant to Stefan Stambolov and a military commander of the Tarnovo revolutionary district.

== Biography ==
Izmirliev was born in the city of Gorna Dzhumaya in the northeast of Ottoman-ruled Macedonia (today Blagoevgrad, Bulgaria). His father, Dimitar Izmirliev, was a small-time merchant. His mother, Tonka Izmirlieva, descended from a hajduk family from Berovo. Georgi Izmirliev studied in Serres (Syar) until he moved to Istanbul (Tsarigrad), where he stayed from 1868 to 1873. In the imperial capital, Izmirliev studied at the Galatasaray High School and received a scholarship from the Bulgarian foundation Prosveshtenie ("Enlightenment"). After his graduation, Izmirliev remained in Istanbul as a teacher and public figure; he participated in Prosveshtenie activities, spread newspapers and gave talks. In the autumn of 1873, he enrolled in the Odessa military college in the Russian Empire as a cadet.

In late 1875, Izmirliev arrived in Giurgiu, Romania, where he joined the Giurgiu Revolutionary Committee as assistant apostle and military commander of a district. Izmirliev crossed the Danube into the Bulgarian lands on 13 January 1876 and met with Tonka Obretenova in Rousse before arriving in Gorna Oryahovitsa, which had been designated the centre of the revolutionary district. For the three months until the uprising, Izmirliev founded a number of new committees and recruited and trained many locals. He also looked for strategically important areas which his detachments could use to battle the Ottomans effectively.

The April Uprising was proclaimed in Koprivshtitsa on 20 April 1876. Due to treason, Izmirliev and a group of other revolutionaries were captured after a gunfight in Gorna Oryahovitsa six days later, on 26 April. Sentenced to death by hanging by a special Ottoman court, Izmirliev was executed on 26 May 1876 in Gorna Oryahovitsa. Reportedly, his last words were "It is gratifying to die for the freedom of the Fatherland!".

Izmirliev's work has been commemorated by monuments in Gorna Oryahovitsa (built 1893–1910) and Blagoevgrad, schools in Gorna Oryahovitsa and Sofia, and a museum house in Blagoevgrad.
