= Georgi Obretenov =

Bulgarian revolutionary

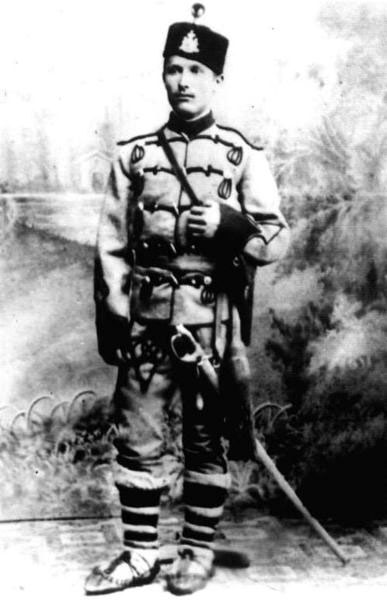
- Born: after 1849; Rousse, present-day Bulgaria
- Died: 10 May 1876; Bulgaria

Georgi Tihov Obretenov (Bulgarian: Георги Тихов Обретенов) was a Bulgarian revolutionary, best known for his participation in the April Uprising of 1876.

== Biography ==
Georgi Obretenov, the youngest son of Tonka Obretenova, was born after 1849. He studied in the class school in Rousse, and afterwards helped his father with his business in the village of Isakcha in Northern Dobruja. In the spring of 1870 Georgi was admitted to the junker school in Odessa.

In order to take part in setting the ground for the Stara Zagora uprising of 1875, he returned to Rousse, and joined the preparations of a detachment's in Veliko Tarnovo. After the uprising's failure, he moved to Romania.

The revolutionary committee in Giurgiu estimated Georgi Obretenov's training and sent him to the region of Sliven as a military instructor and as an assistant apostle to Ilarion Dragostinov. Along with the weapons, Obretenov brought to Sliven some revolutionary proclamations, by-laws, a flag, and the inspiring poetry of Hristo Botev and Stefan Stambolov.

Dragostinov and Obretenov chose different routes to Sliven. Dragostinov travelled through Svishtov and Arbanasi, in order to bid farewell to his parents and relatives. Obretenov's route was through Rousse. After passing the Balkan Mountains, he stayed in Tvarditsa at priest Stefan's, and hid the dangerous luggage in the altar of the local church. Then, he set off to the village of Korten to visit Georgi Kolev, the leader of the local revolutionary committee, with whose help he hid the items he carried in a wheat cart, and they both arrived in Sliven.

The coming of the two gave new impulse to the preparations in Sliven, though they didn't manage to reach consensus with local activists in terms of tactics. The locals' plan was to adopt a course of preparation of detachments, who were to operate in the Balkan Mountains, without exciting a revolt in town. This viewpoint dominated, and put an imprint the overall preparatory work, and later on the range and power of the uprising throughout the Sliven region.

The military instructor, Georgi Obretenov, brought to Sliven modern guns, having issued directions about arms before departing from Giurgiu. He wrote that every rebel had to possess a revolver with 200 bullets, a gun with 250 bullets, and a knife. Furthermore, each of them was to provide two cartridge-boxes for the bullets. Undoubtedly, Obrevenov strived for imposing those requirements on everyone in the Second Revolutionary Region. Concerning military action, he gave oral instructions without leaving anything on paper. There is information that the leaders of the Sliven revolutionary committee took care to supply modern guns from Romania. They grew funds from the rebels' voluntary donations.

Obretenov brought to Sliven a flag sewn by his sisters Petrana and Anastasia. Therefore, Sliven revolutionaries considered it unnecessary to prepare their own flag.

The leaders of the rebel group, gathered on "Kush Bunar"—Ilarion Dragostinov, Stoil Voyvoda, Georgi Obretenov, and Georgi Drazhev—decided to execute the adopted plan for touring the Balkan villages in the vicinity of Kotel and exciting a revolt, despite the small number of rebels.

Attempting to go back for food through Neykovo, the detachment were confronted by bashi-bazouks, regular army, and cherkez cavalry. On their way back, they fought, and Obretenov was fatally wounded in the battle. On 10 May 1876, realizing that, he committed suicide.

== Sources ==
- Божинов, П. (2000). Кой кой е сред българите XV–XIX (in Bulgarian). София.

Bozhinov, P. (2000). Who is who among Bulgarians, 15th–19th century (in Bulgarian). Sofia.

- Косев, К. (2001). Априлското въстание в съдбата на българския народ (in Bulgarian). София.

Kosev, K. (2001). The April uprising in the fate of the Bulgarian people (in Bulgarian). Sofia.

- Митев, Й. (1981). История на Априлското въстание 1876 том 1 (in Bulgarian). София.

Mitev, Y. (1981). History of the April uprising of 1876, volume 1 (in Bulgarian). Sofia.
