= Vera Ignatieva =

Bulgarian actress

- Вера Игнатиева
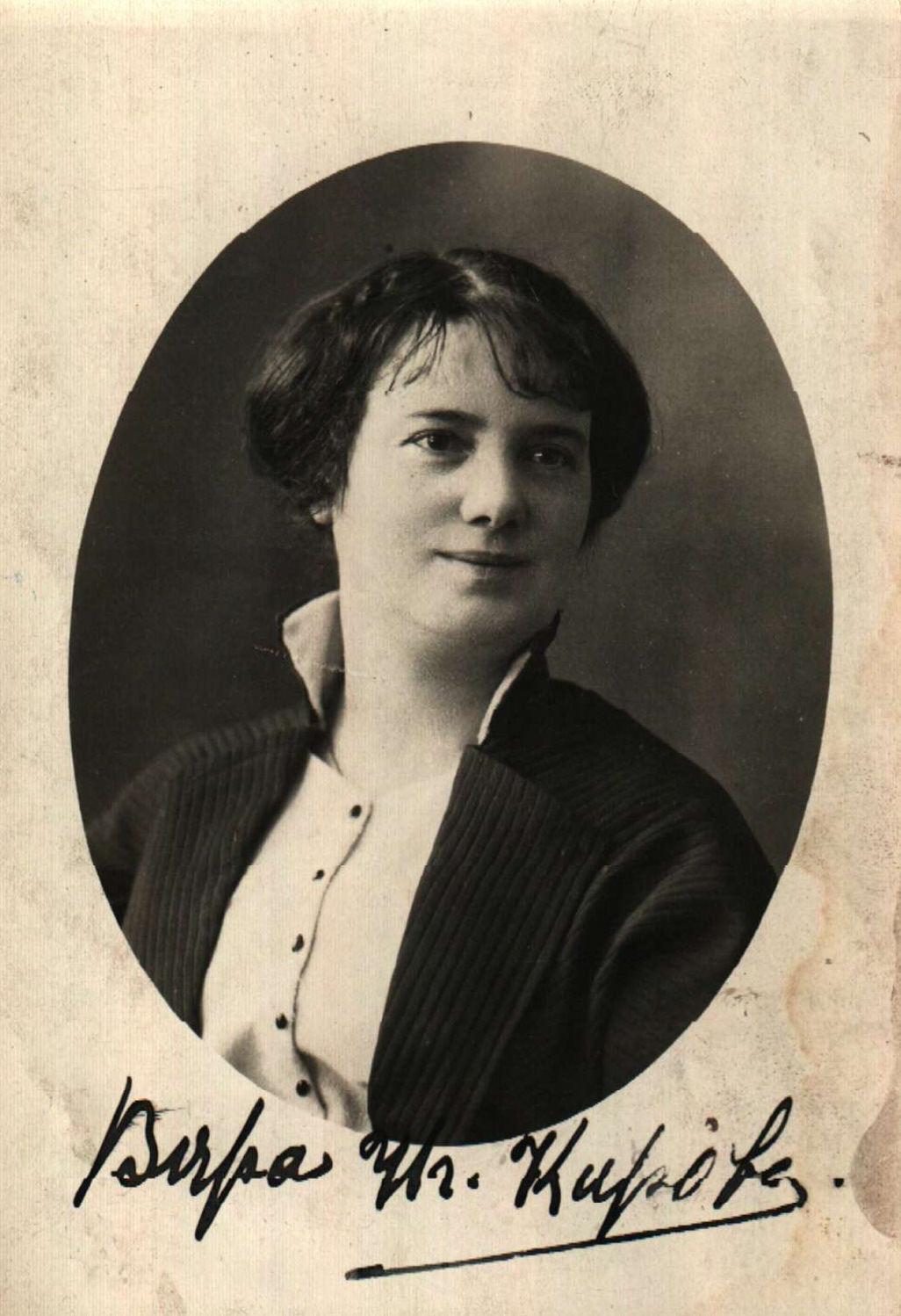
- A Portrait Photo of Vera Ignatieva
- Born: 15 April 1875; Tsarigrad, Ottoman Empire
- Died: 13 December 1972 (aged 97); Sofia, Bulgaria
- Known for: Theatrical actress
- Spouse: Geno Kirov

Vera Ignatieva-Kirova (Bulgarian: Вера Игнатиева, 15 April 1875 – 13 December 1972) was a Bulgarian stage and film actress. She was also the spouse of Geno Kirov.

== Biography ==
Vera Ignatieva was born on 15 April 1875, in Istanbul, Ottoman Empire. She graduated in the pedagogic high-school in Plovdiv. She later became a teacher in Pazardzhik. From 1895 until 1898 she studied dramatic art in the conservatory in Vienna. In 1898, she returned to Bulgaria and made her acting debut in Salza i Smyah as the role of Maria Zhana.

Vera Ignatieva specialized in Paris, Berlin, Vienna, and Moscow. She played in the Tear and Laughter Salza i Smyah troupe at the National Theater in Sofia from 1904 to 1923.

She is known as one of the first Bulgarian female actresses with a formal professional education.

She died on 13 December 1972 in Sofia.

== Major Theater Roles ==
- Lyuba in Ludetina by Victor Krilov
- Dorina in Tartuffe by Molière
- Luisa in Intrigue and Love by Friedrich Schiller
- Rosina in The Barber of Seville by Pierre Beaumarchais

== Major Film roles ==
- Pod Igoto (1952)
- Parva Tochka (1956)
