= Richard Millman (historian) =

American historian (1932–1983)

Richard Millman (1932–1983) was an American historian. He worked at the University of Illinois, and was an instructor at Temple University in 1960–1961.

Millman's 1979 work on Benjamin Disraeli's policy during the Great Eastern Crisis of 1875–78 (Britain and the Eastern Question) was called the "authoritative account" by M. R. D. Foot and a "masterly achievement" by John Vincent. According to Richard Shannon, Millman "challenges the Seton-Watsonian tradition and boldly essays to restore the credibility of Disraeli's attempt to reassert the Palmerstonian tradition of maintaining the independence and integrity of the Ottoman Empire as a capital British interest".

== Works ==
- British Foreign Policy and the Coming of the Franco-Prussian War (Oxford: Clarendon Press, 1965). ISBN 0198213271
- Britain and the Eastern Question, 1875-1878 (Oxford: Clarendon Press, 1979). ISBN 019822379X
- 'The Bulgarian Massacres Reconsidered', The Slavonic and East European Review, Vol. 58, No. 2 (Apr., 1980), pp. 218–231.
