= Arbanasi (Veliko Tarnovo) =

Arbanasi Арбанаси Arbanas
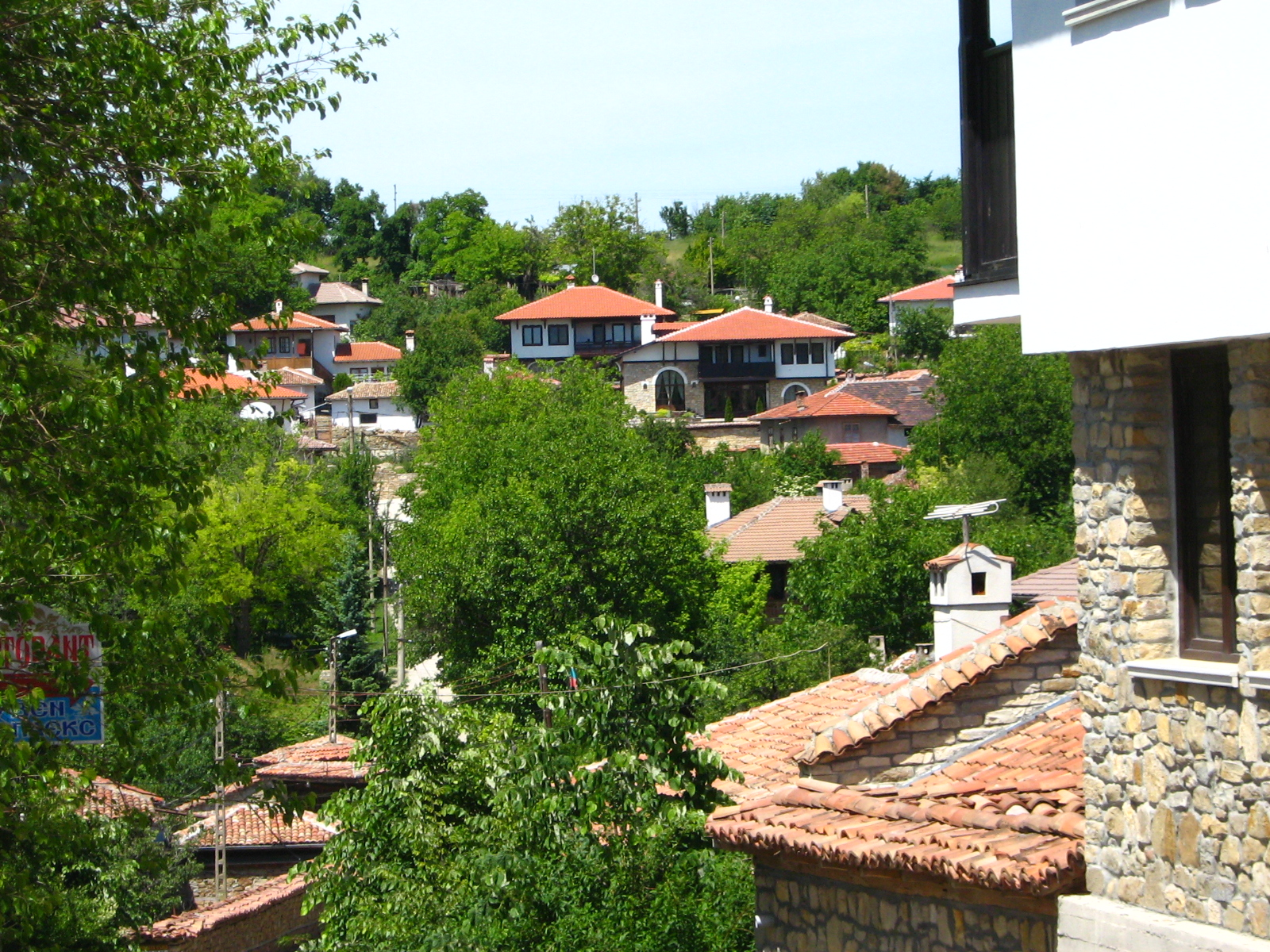
- Overview of Arbanasi with new and old houses in a traditional style

- Location within Bulgaria
- Country: Bulgaria
- Time zone: UTC+2 (EET)
  - Summer (DST): UTC+3 (EEST)
- Area code: 062
- Website: Arbanassi.org, The Official Website of Arbanassi

Arbanasi (Bulgarian: Арбанаси [arbɐˈnasi]; Albanian: Arbanas) is a village in Veliko Tarnovo Municipality, Veliko Tarnovo Province of central northern Bulgaria, set on a high plateau between the larger towns of Veliko Tarnovo (four kilometres away) and Gorna Oryahovitsa. It is known for the rich history and large number of historical monuments, such as 17th- and 18th-century churches and examples of Bulgarian National Revival architecture, which have turned it into a popular tourist destination.

The name of the village is derived from the word Arbanas meaning "Albanian" in Bulgarian of the medieval period. During the Ottoman era, the Turkish term Arnavud meaning "Albanian" was also used as a name for the village. As of 2005, Arbanasi has a population of 291 and the mayor is Tosho Krastev. It lies at 43°6′N 25°40′E, 400 metres above sea level.

== History ==
=== Early history ===
The lack of other documentary material leaves different opinions and speculations about the settlement's origin, name and population. It is accepted by some scholars that the village was populated by Bulgarian boyars that came from the westernmost parts of the Second Bulgarian Empire after Ivan Asen II of Bulgaria's important victory over the Byzantines near Klokotnitsa on 9 March 1230, when the tsar conquered "the land of the Albanians" (зємѧ арбанаскѫѫ). This assumption is supported by 19th century notes from Georgi Rakovski and other scholars, but by no direct evidence or contemporary source.

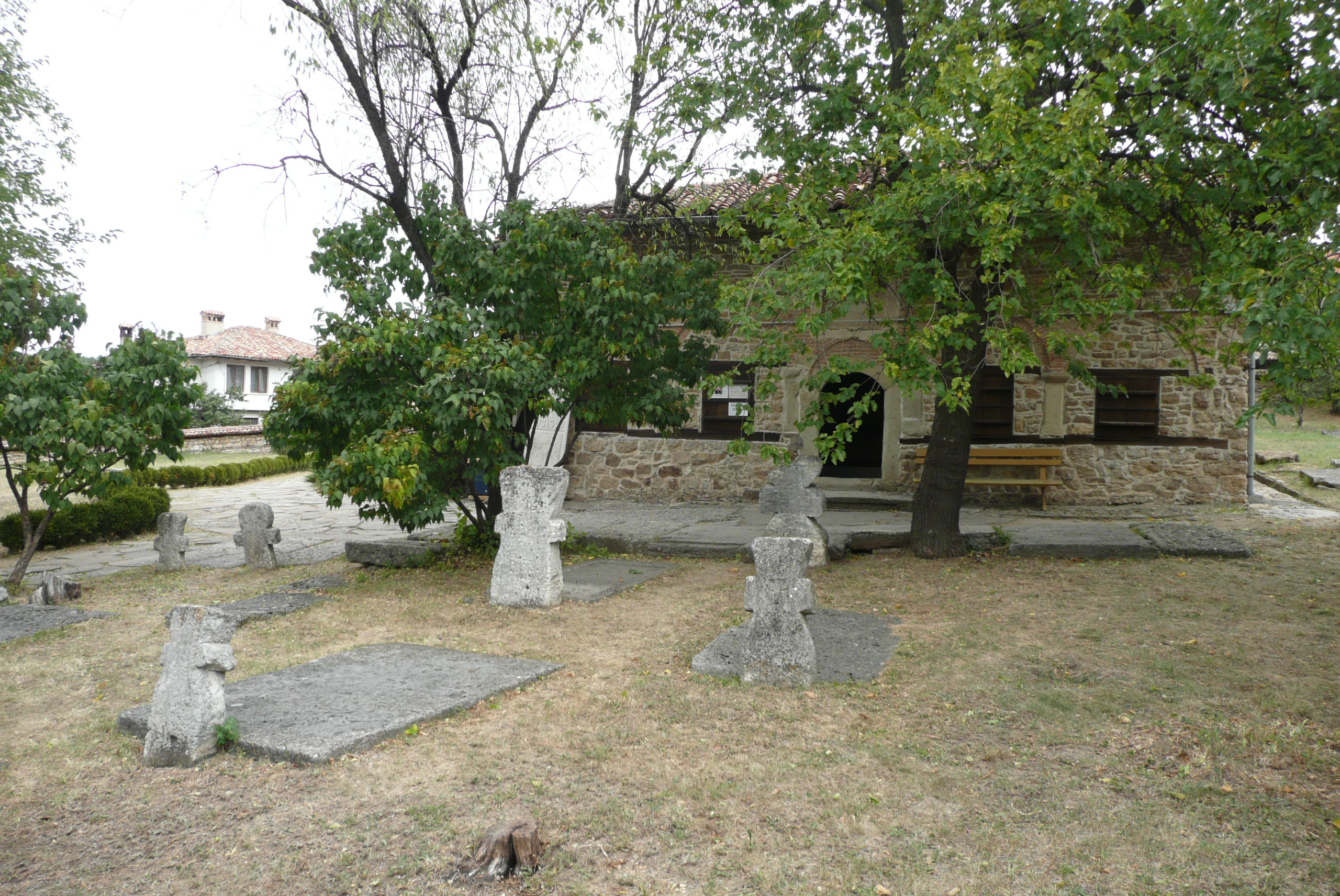
The Nativity of Christ church in Arbanasi, 16th - 17th century

The earliest written document that marks the beginning of Arbanasi's history is a royal decree by the Ottoman sultan Suleiman the Magnificent from 1538, according to which the sultan offered the lands of the modern localities of Arbanasi, Lyaskovets, Gorna Oryahovitsa and Dolna Oryahovitsa to his son-in-law Grand Vizier Rustem Pasha as a gift. The four villages are united under the name Arnaud Kariyeleri ("the Albanian villages") in the document, and the first settlers may have been Albanians and Greeks from Epirus; although Albanian names could be found in the Ottoman tax registers, Orthodox and Slavic names already prevailed.

The tax registers of 1541–1544 describe Arnavud köy (also Darı ova) as a village of 63 households and 72 unmarried men. In 1579–1580, it already numbered 271 households and 277 unmarried men, or a quadruple increase for forty years, indicating an influx of settlers. The village preserved its purely Christian character and prospered in the 17th century.

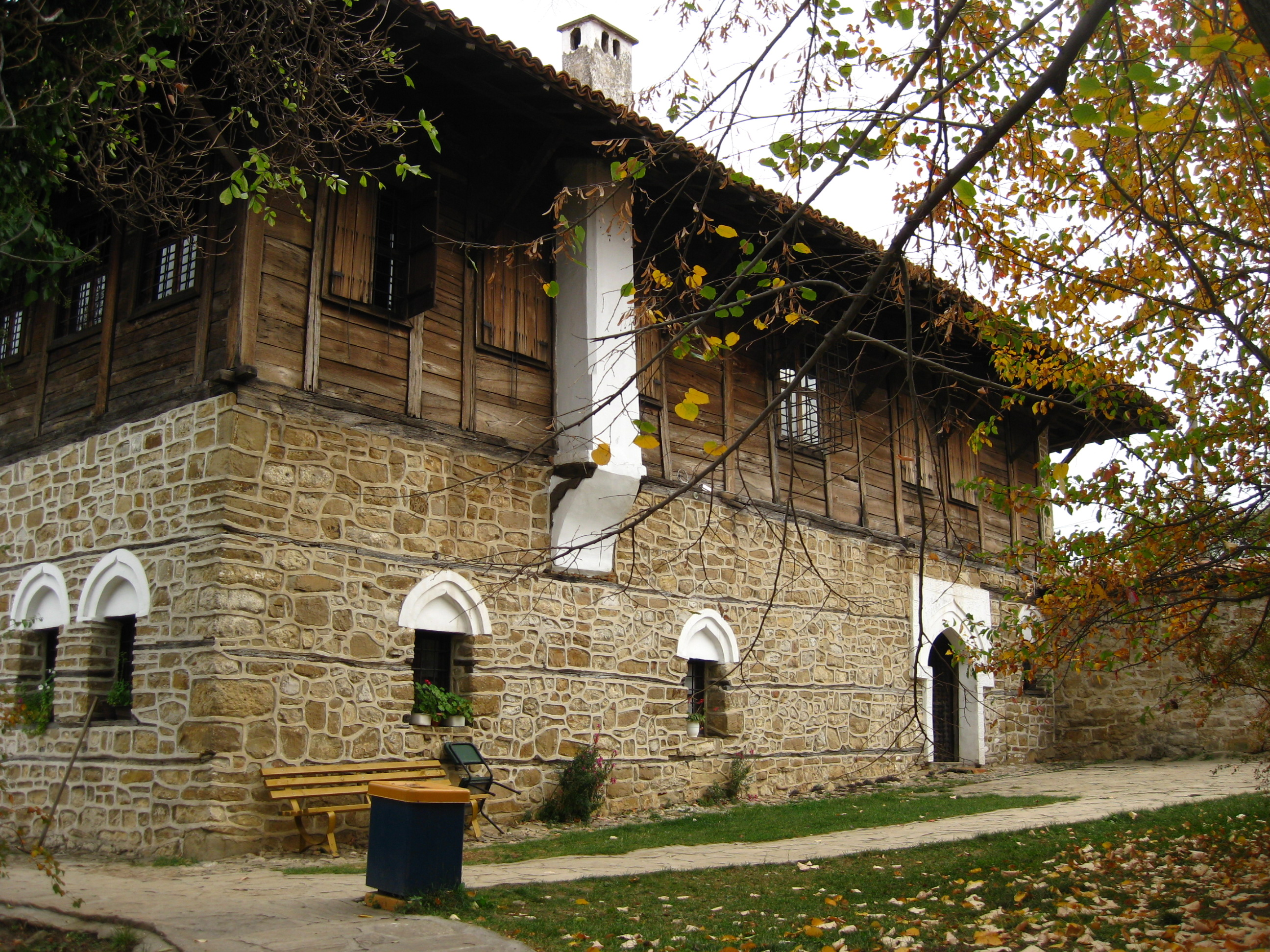
Old house in Arbanasi

Other sources that mention Arbanasi are the notes of Pavel Đorđić from 10 January 1595 addressed to the Transylvanian Prince Sigismund Báthory. The village is also mentioned by the Roman Catholic bishop of Sofia Petar Bogdan Bakshev, who visited Tarnovo in 1640. He remarked there was a village up in the mountains, from where the whole of Tarnovo could be seen, that had about 1,000 houses. Another Roman Catholic bishop, Anton Stefanov, refers to Arbanasi in 1685. According to his account, there were Arbanasi merchants trading in Italy, Hungary, Poland and particularly in Muscovy.

=== Heyday and decline ===
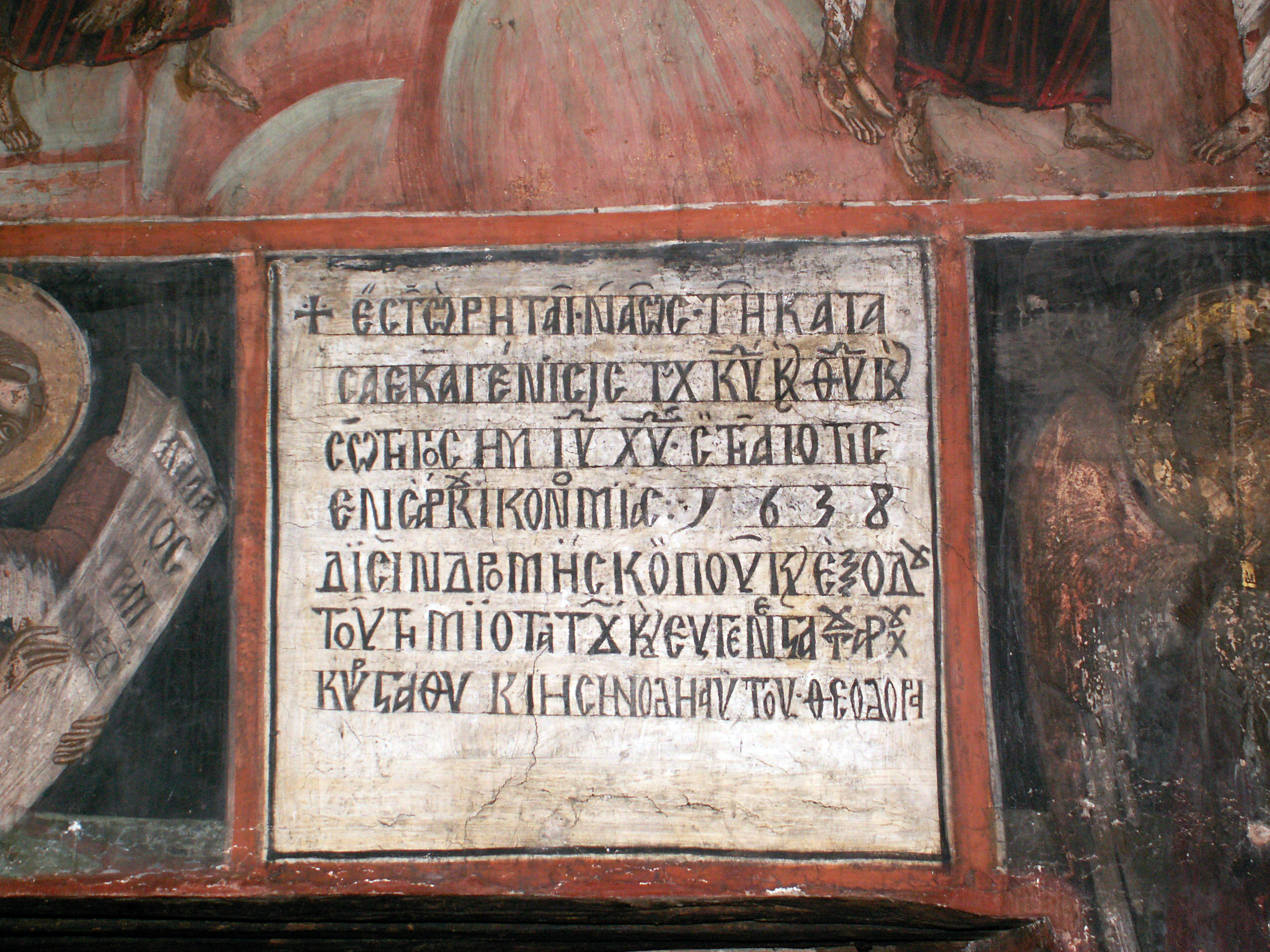
A 17th-century inscription in Greek from the Church of the Nativity of Christ, Arbanasi (the Bulgarian Orthodox population in the Ottoman Empire until 1870 was under the spiritual authority of the Greek Patriarchate of Constantinople)

There is considerably richer documentary material, such as correspondence and chronicler's notes on religious books, preserved from the 17th and 18th century, that evidences that Arbanasi reached its economic blossoming between the second half of the 17th and the end of the 18th century. The settlement had over 1,000 houses at the time, its population consisting mostly of eminent merchant families who traded in Transylvania (mostly Sibiu and Braşov), the Danubian Principalities, Russia and Poland. Handicrafts were well-developed, with copper- and goldsmithing, vine-growing and silk production playing an important part. The homes of the rich merchants, as well as the five churches built in the years of progress, bear record of the economic upsurge and prosperity.

In the 18th century, Arbanasi was regularly donated by the Phanariote rulers of Wallachia, and a number of expelled Wallachian nobles settled temporarily in the village, e.g. Nicolae Brâncoveanu, Ioan (Ianache) Văcărescu, etc. In 1790, there were 17 Wallachian nobles with their families in Arbanași. To this day, some of the houses in Arbanasi bear the names of their former Wallachian owners (Brâncoveanu, Cantacuzino, Filipescu).

As a result of well-organized brigand raids in 1792, 1798 ad 1810, the settlement was pillaged and burnt down. The plague and cholera epidemics further damaged the town's well-being. The richest merchants fled to Wallachia and Russia. A new settlement of Bulgarians began after 1810, when people came down from the Elena and Teteven parts of the Balkan Mountains, but Arbanasi could never again reach its former heyday. An Ottoman royal decree of 1839 deprived the town of its former privileges and the development of handicraftsmanship after the Crimean War almost ceased.

Arbanasi experienced strong Greek cultural influence for centuries. There was a Greek school and divine services were in Greek (at that time Bulgarian Orthodox Church was banned by the Ottoman authorities and Bulgarian orthodox population officially had to be served by the Greek Orthodox Church). This, however, did not reflect the local population's national self-consciousness, as Arbanasi residents took part in the organized armed struggle of Bulgarians that ultimately led to the Liberation of Bulgaria from Ottoman rule as a consequence of the Russo-Turkish War of 1877-78.

== Landmarks ==
- Arbanasi Monastery of the Dormition of the Mother of God (17th-18th century)
- Monastery of Saint Nicholas (17th-18th century)
- Church of the Nativity of Christ (c. 15th-17th century)
- Church of Saints Archangels Michael and Gabriel (16th-18th century)
- Church of Saint Athanasius (17th century)
- Church of Saint George (17th century)
- Church of Saint Demetrius (17th-18th century)
- Konstantsaliyata's House (18th century)
- Hadzhi Iliya's House
- Other 18th century merchant's houses
- Arbanasi Palace - former holiday home of Bulgarian General Secretary of the Communist Party and Head of State Todor Zhivkov (now a hotel & bar)

== Honour ==
Arbanasi Nunatak on Livingston Island in the South Shetland Islands, Antarctica is named for Arbanasi.

== Notable people ==
- Ilarion Dragostinov
- Vasile Lupu

== Gallery ==
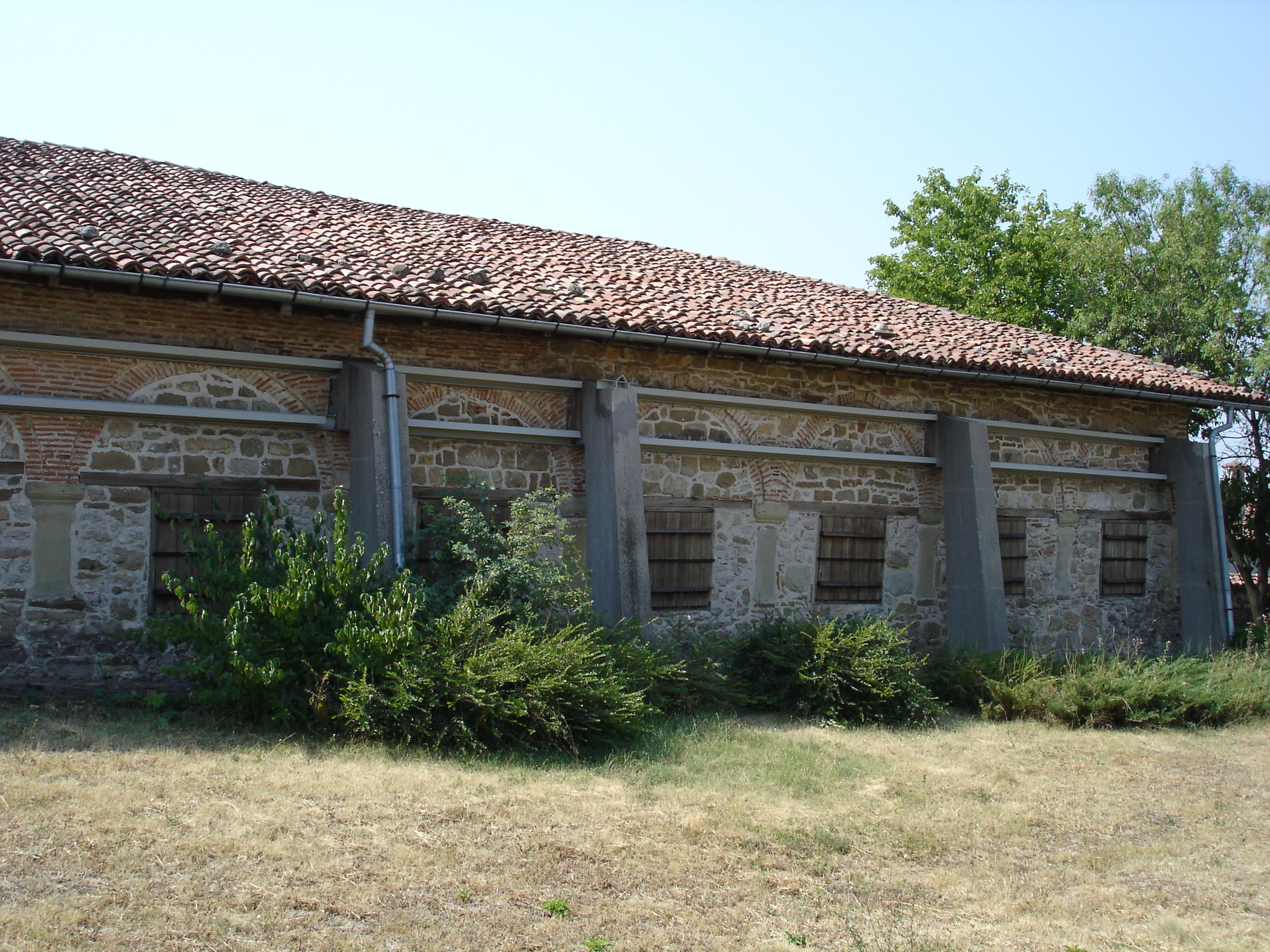
Church of the Nativity of Christ exterior

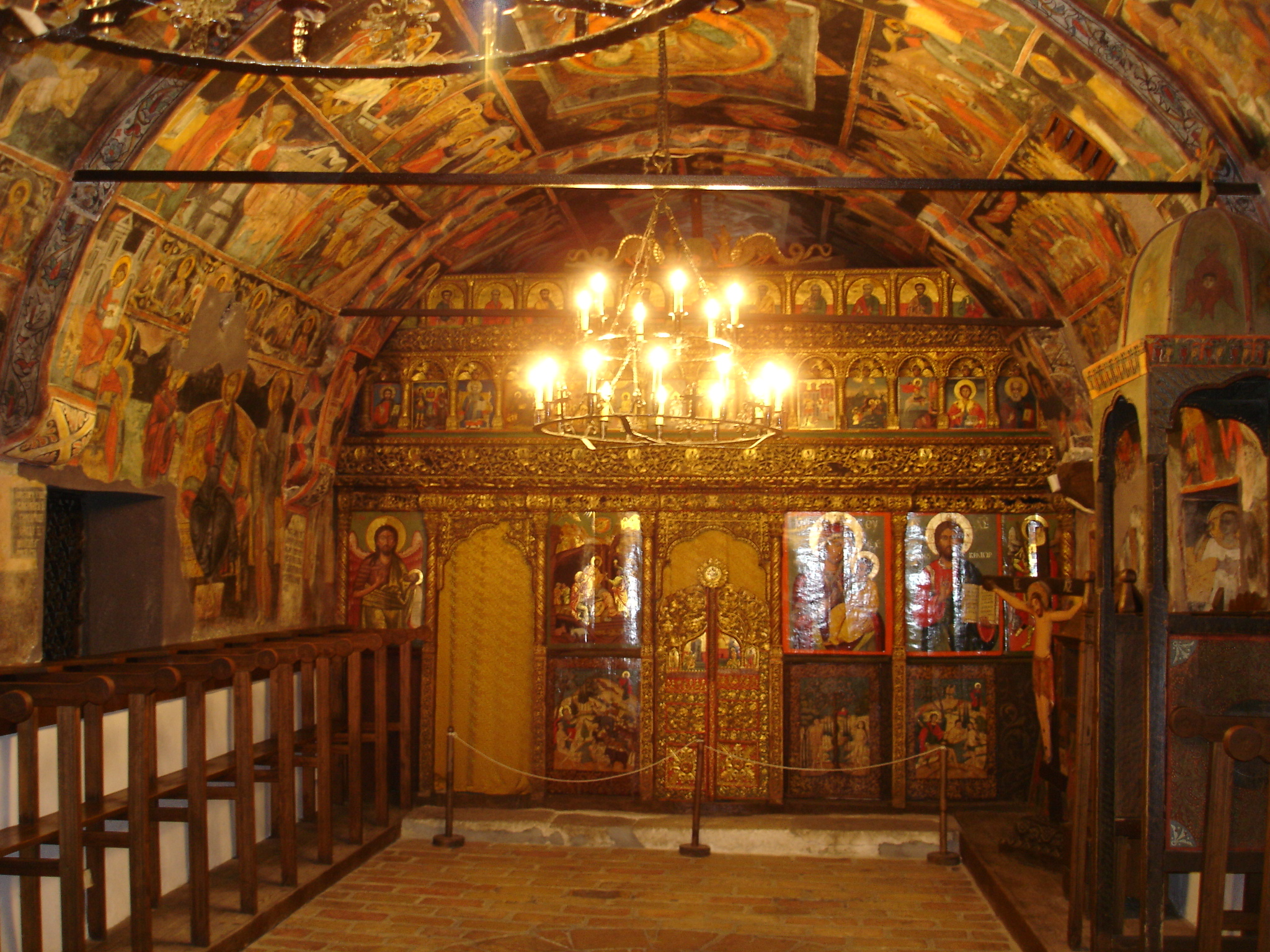
Church of the Nativity of Christ iconostasis

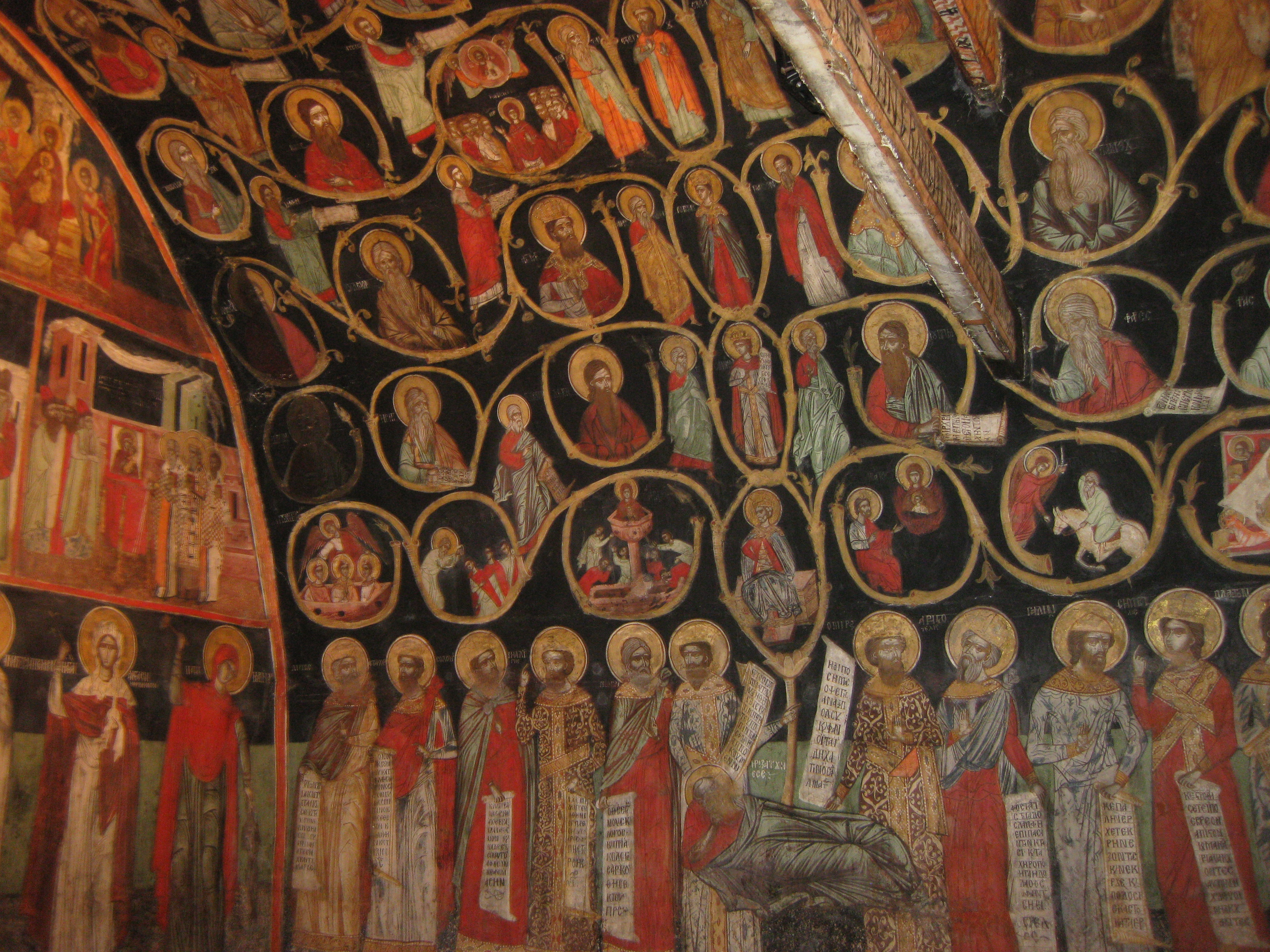
The Tree of Jesse (with Greek philosophers at the bottom), Church of the Nativity of Christ

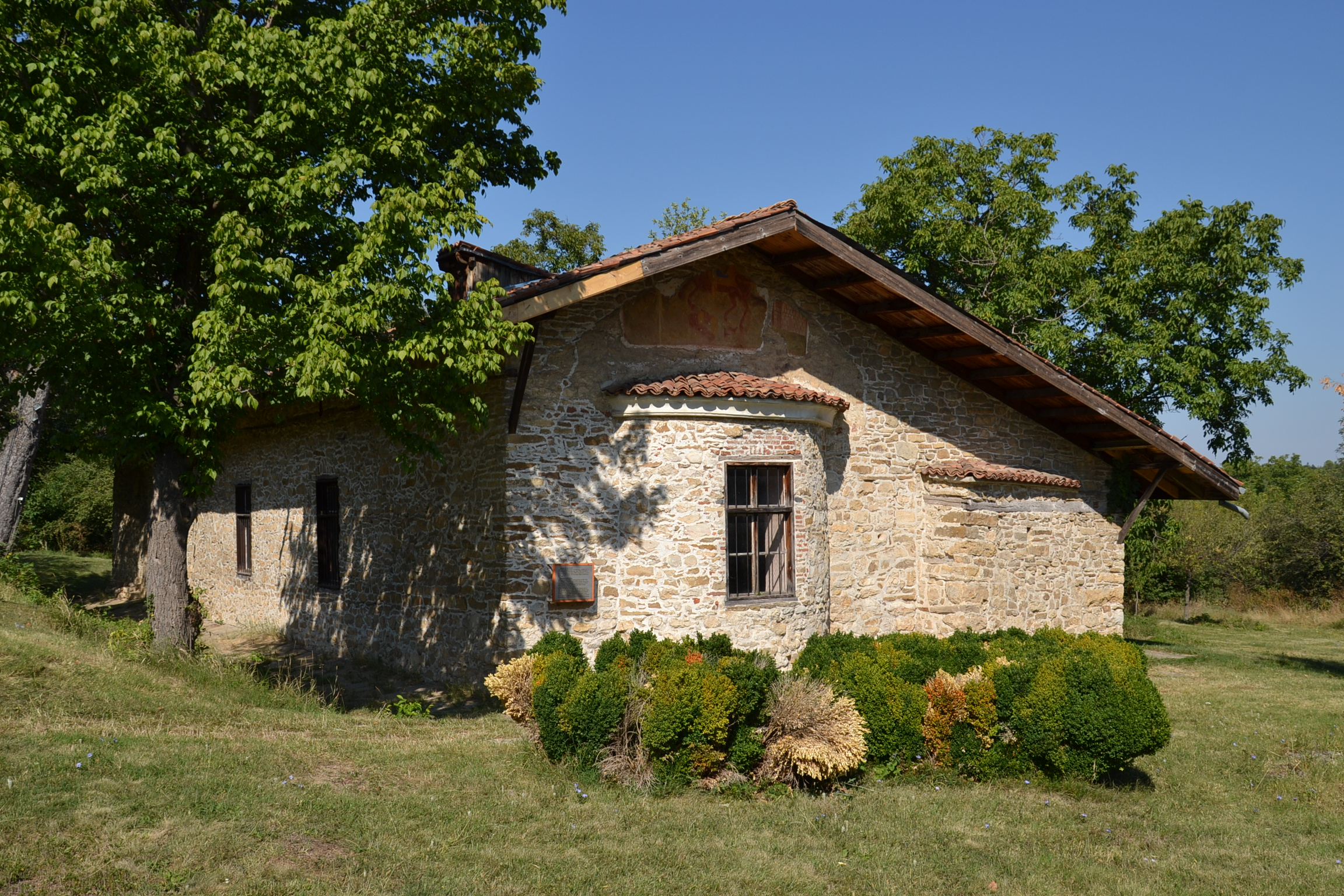
Church of Saint Demetrius

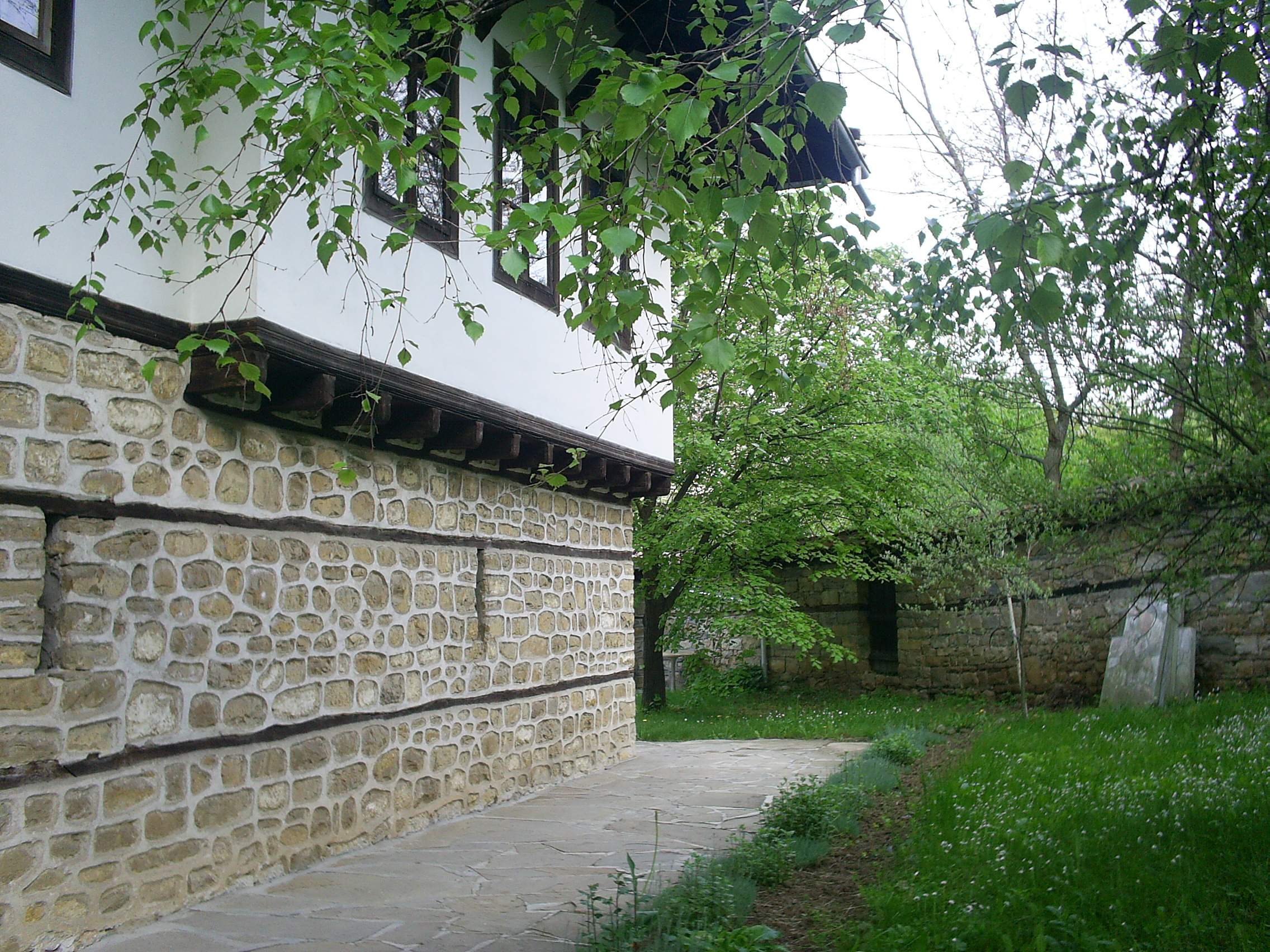
Old house

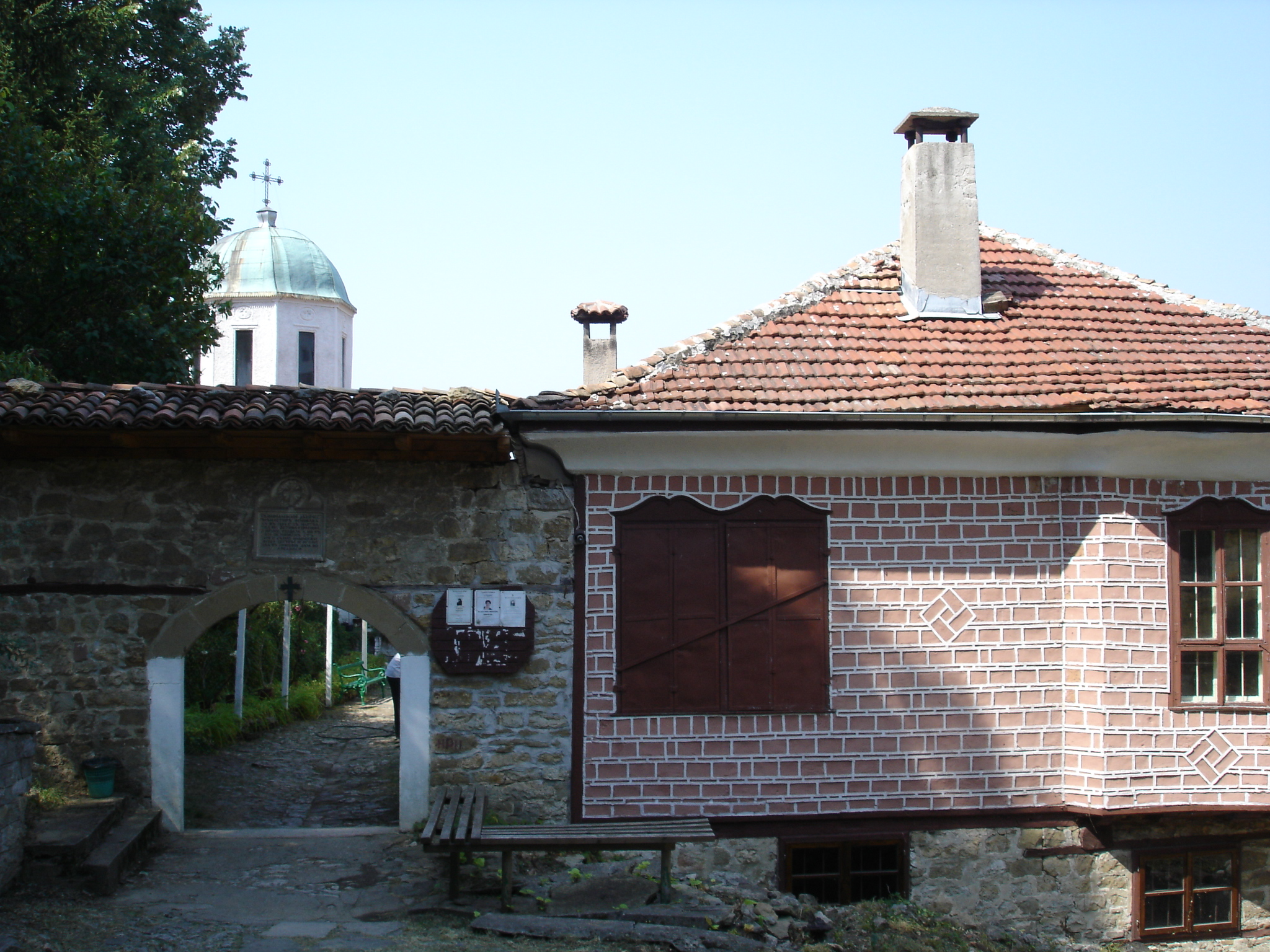
Monastery of Saint Nicholas

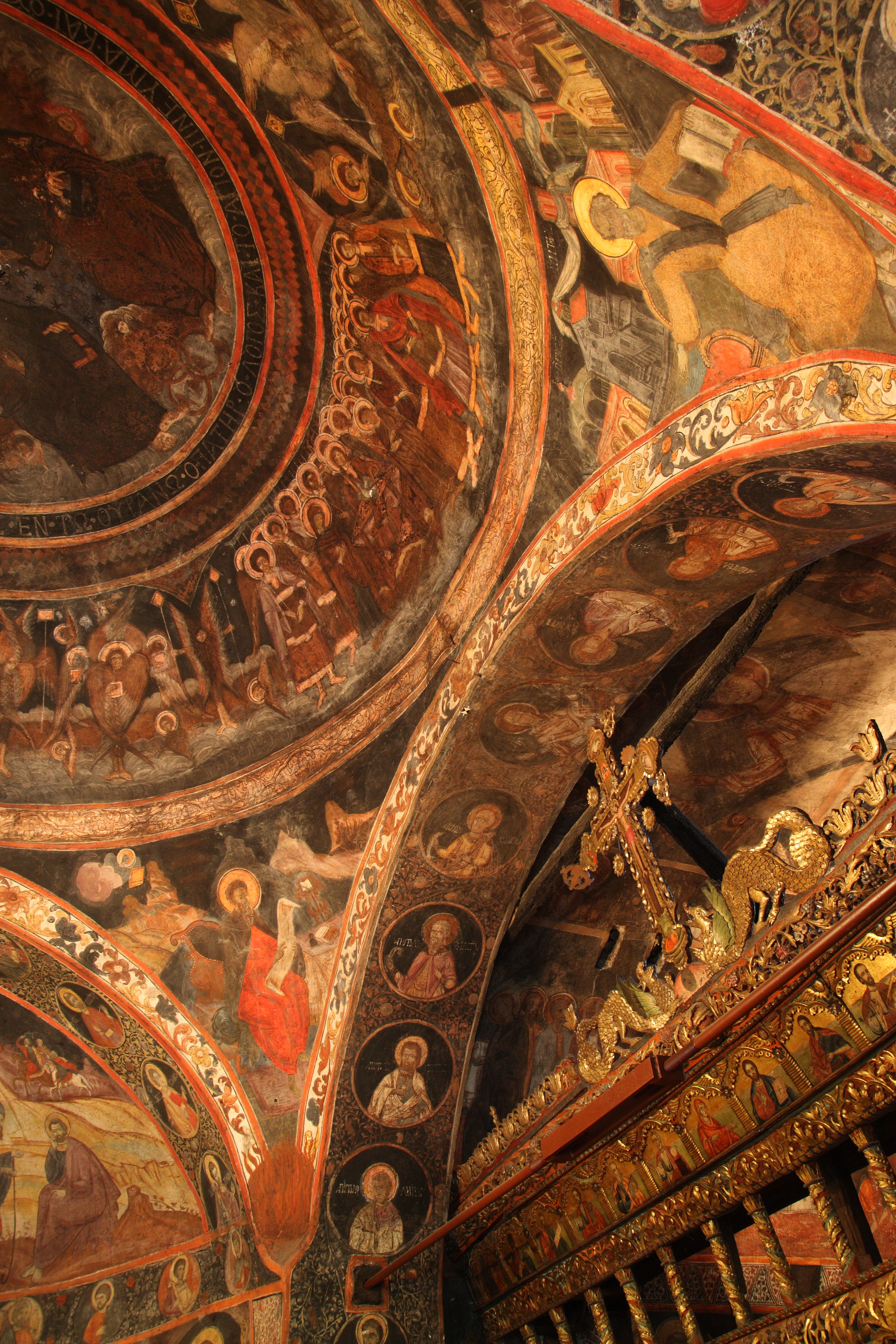
Interior of the Church of Holy Archangels Michael and Gabriel
