= Ilarion Dragostinov =

Bulgarian revolutionary (c. 1852–1876)

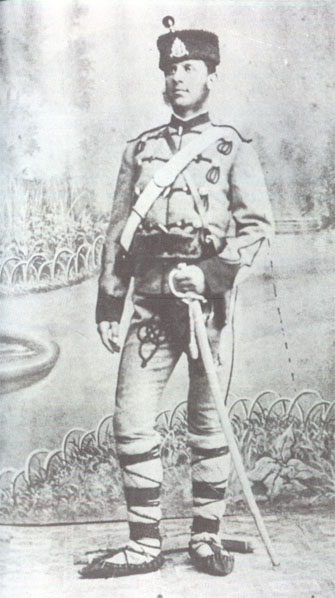
Ilarion Dragostinov (c. 1852–10 May 1876)

Ilarion Ivanov Dragostinov (Bulgarian: Иларион Иванов Драгостинов; c. 1852 – 10 May 1876), nicknamed Arbanascheto (Арбанасчето, "The Arbanasi Boy") was a Bulgarian revolutionary and an important figure in the organization and direction of the anti-Ottoman April Uprising of 1876.

Dragostinov was born in Arbanasi, once a rich merchant's village near Veliko Tarnovo, around 1852. His father was the Elena frieze dealer Ivan Dragostinov and his mother was the daughter of the eminent Arbanasi merchant Panayot Anastasoglu. As Greek influence in Arbanasi was still strong at the time, Ilarion studied at the local Greek-language school. In 1868, he finished the head class school for boys in Tarnovo; besides Greek and Bulgarian, he also learned French and Turkish and later Romanian, Italian and German. In Tarnovo, Dragostinov joined the Bulgarian patriotic circles and endorsed armed struggle against the Ottoman oppression.

In 1868, Dragostinov moved to Ruse and became close with the leaders of the Zora ("Dawn") community centre (chitalishte), active promoters of revolution and enlightenment. He was an opponent of the Greek influence in the city and even participated in the burning of the building which was supposed to house the local Greek church. In Rousse, Dragostinov opened his own broker's firm and worked with merchants from Istanbul (Tsarigrad), Vienna, Bucharest, Galaţi, Odessa, Giurgiu and cities in the Bulgarian lands. A respected and well-educated merchant, Dragostinov dedicated himself to revolutionary work. In 1871, he took part in the establishment of the Ruse revolutionary committee; in order to have a more active contribution to its doings, he abandoned his office and became an agent and telegraph operator with the Ruse railway station. As a railway worker Dragostinov assisted his fellow revolutionaries' flight to Romania; he also followed Ottoman telegraph orders and notified the committee. In 1872, he was sent by the Rousse committee to Bucharest as their envoy to the Bulgarian Revolutionary Central Committee's general assembly.

In 1874, he was sent to Shumen to restore the local committee, in decline after Panayot Volov's imprisonment and flight. However, he was unsuccessful and returned to Rousse; betrayed shortly thereafter, he escaped to nearby Wallachia. At an assembly of the Giurgiu Revolutionary Committee in December 1875 he was elected the apostle of the future uprising's Second Revolutionary District, based in Sliven. He arrived in Svishtov on 21 March, took his leave of his relatives in Arbanasi and arrived in the Sliven region to head the district. As the uprising broke out prematurely in Panagyurishte amidst arrests, only a few locals followed Dragostinov and formed a revolutionary band in the Sliven Balkan Mountains on 3 May. His band joined that of Stoil Voyvoda; the band was crushed by an Ottoman pursuit party. Although Dragostinov managed to escape with a small group of people, they were ambushed by another party at the Vratnik Pass near Kotel, where Dragostinov died in combat on 10 May 1876.
