= Stara Zagora Uprising =

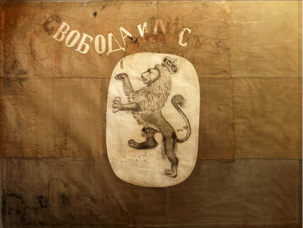
- The Banner of the Stara Zagora Uprising, citing "Death or Freedom"

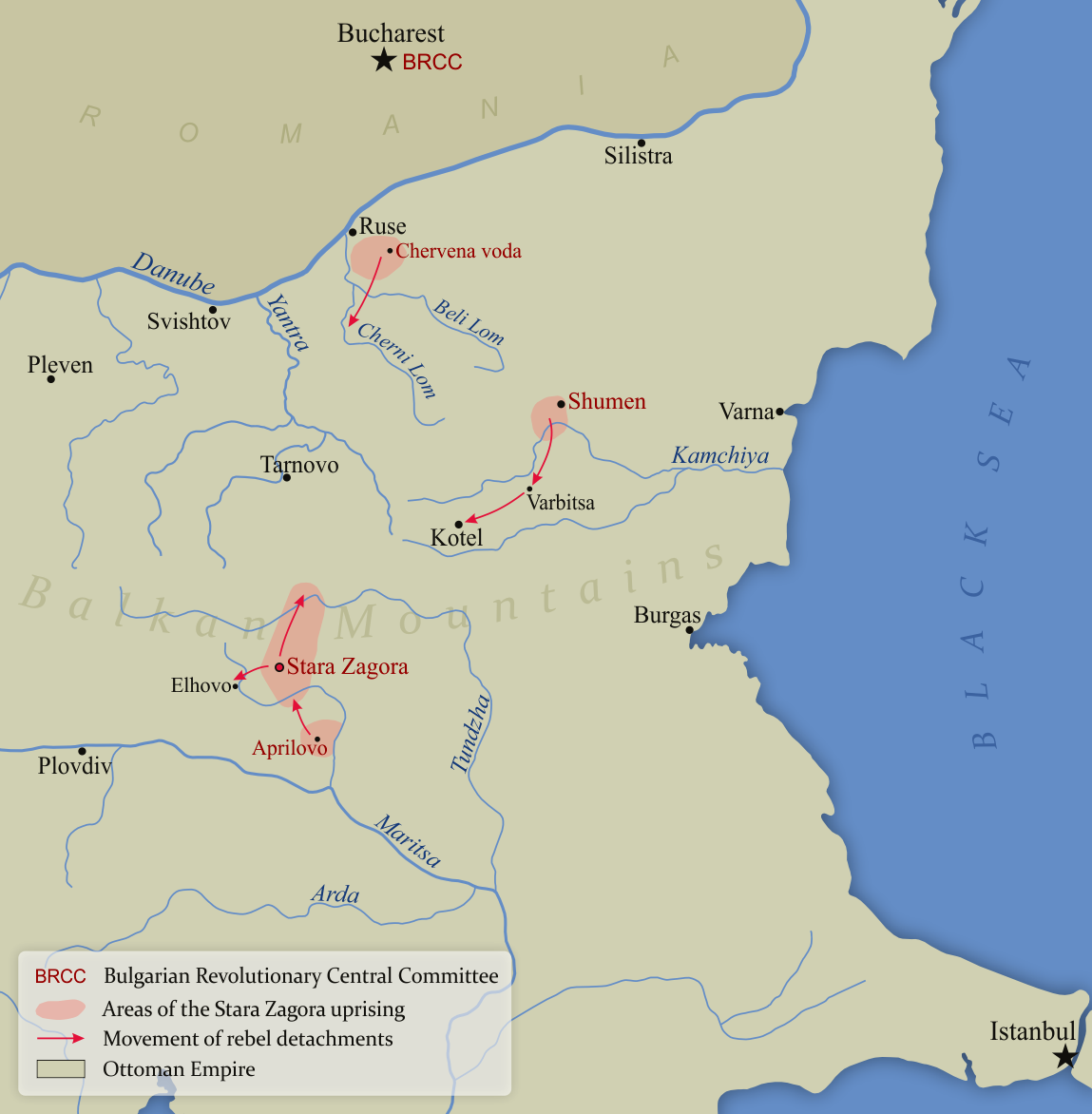
- Map showing the movements of the Rebels in the Stara Zagora Uprising
- Native name: Старозагорското Възстание
- Date: 1875 September 16
- Outcome: Failed attempt, led to the April Uprising

The Stara Zagora Uprising (Bulgarian:Старозагорското въстание) was an uprising organized by the Bulgarian Revolutionary Central Committee against the Ottoman Empire in 1875. Though this uprising was largely unsuccessful, it would later serve as inspiration for the more successful April Uprising of 1876.

== Organization and regions ==
On 12 August 1875, the Bulgarian Revolutionary Central Committee or BRCC, made the decision to prepare the entire people of Bulgaria for an uprising. Five regions were distributed: Ruse-Shumen, Veliko Tarnovo, Sliven and Lovech-Troyan. The capital location of the uprising was chosen to be Stara Zagora, hence the name. The leader of the Stara Zagora Uprising and region was Stefan Stambolov, who is considered one of the founders of modern post-Ottoman Bulgaria. Some members of the committee, however, did not entirely agree on the proper timing of the Uprising and wanted to wait.

Because of this disunion of opinions, on 16 September in Stara Zagora, not enough rebels gathered to support the cause. Some of the rebels hid or left the country, whereas others were chased by the Turks, such as the brothers Mihail and Georgi Zhekov.

== Simultaneous uprisings ==
The Stara Zagora Uprising was widespread in the villages around Stara Zagora. More than 800 people joined the rebellion in 6 large rural groups of rebels. Some of them started joining the rebels of the city. Heavy battles were led in the area of Elhovo, Samuilovo and Obrochishte. The rebel groups of Stefan Chifutov (105 people) and Rusi Bakardzhiyata (120 people) fought the Turks near Elhovo.

Simultaneously with the Stara Zagora Uprising, there were smaller uprisings in both Shumen and Ruse, though, these would consist of 20-30 men each, which would later be forced to disband once the news of the failed uprising in Stara Zagora reached them.

The Stara Zagora Uprising served as a check of the rebels' strength and readiness, paving the way for the liberation through the April Uprising in 1876, which would eventually capture the attention of the Great Powers.

After the Uprising had been dispersed, the Ottoman authorities imposed serious penalties. More than 600 people were arrested and punished with death and other forms of torture.

== Notable participants ==
- Ivan Vladikov
- Kolyo Ganchev
- Stefan Stambolov
- Ivan Hadzhidimitrov
- Gospodin Mihaylovski
- Hristo Shikirov
- Rusi Argov
- Nikola Raynov
- Zahari Stoyanov
- Georgi Ikonomov
- Panayot Volov
