= Filipescu =

Filipescu is a surname common in Romania, meaning "son of Philip" and may refer to:

- the Filipescu family of Wallachian boyars (also known as Filipide), having among its members Mitică Filipescu (radical revolutionary), Alecu Filipescu-Vulpea (minister), Ioan Filipescu (caimacam of Wallachia), Nicolae Filipescu and Grigore Filipescu (conservative politicians)
- Elena Filipescu (or Filipovici), communist militant
- Iulian Filipescu, Romanian football player
- Leonte Filipescu, communist militant
- Miltidate Filipescu, geologist
- Radu Filipescu, Romanian anti-Communist dissident and inventor
- Zaharia Filipescu, actor
