= April Uprising of 1876 =

1876 rebellion in Ottoman Bulgaria

April Uprising
- Part of Great Eastern Crisis
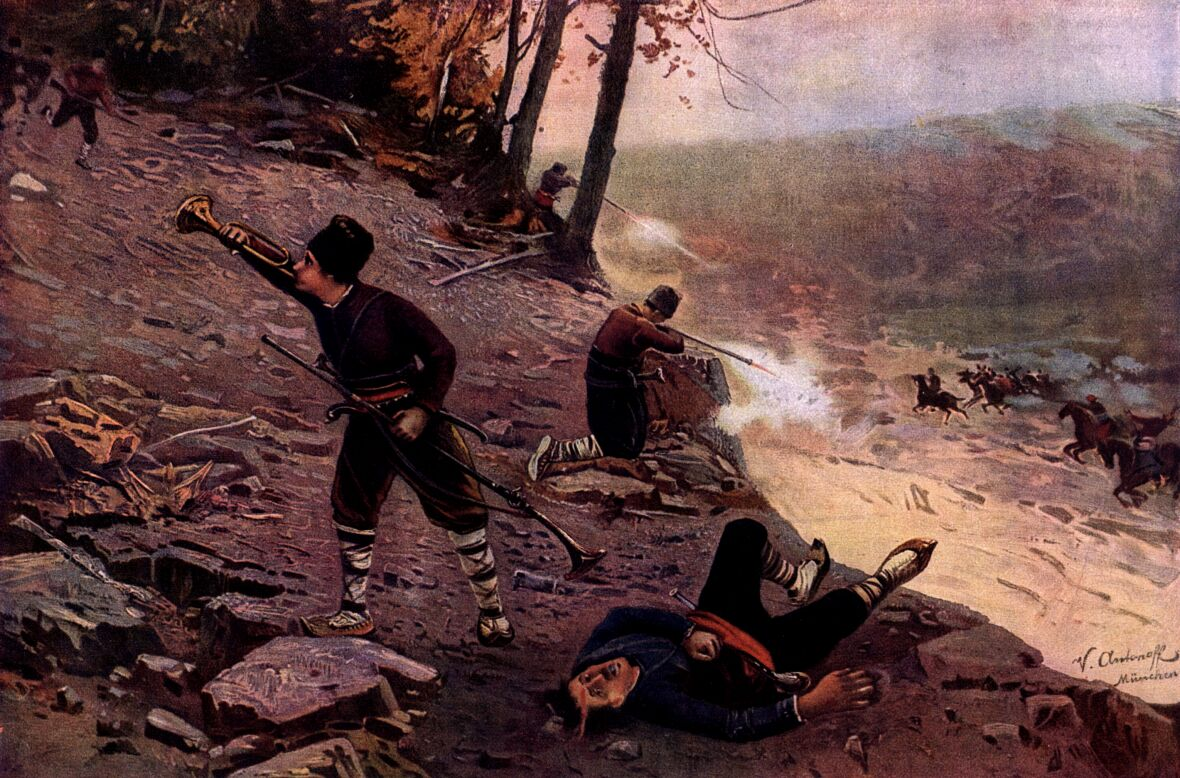
Date	20 April – 26 May 1876 (1 month and 6 days)
Location	Ottoman Bulgaria
Result	Uprising suppressed

Belligerents
Bulgarian Revolutionary Central Committee	Ottoman Empire

Commanders and leaders
Georgi Benkovski †; Ilarion Dragostinov †; Panayot Volov †; Hristo Botev †	(Ottoman Empire) Hafiz Pasha (Ottoman Empire) Yusuf Aga of Sofya (Ottoman Empire) Hasan Pasha of Niş

Strength
Around 10,000 men	Around 100,000 men

Casualties and losses
15,000–30,000 killed (including civilians)	200–4,000 killed

The April Uprising (Bulgarian: Априлско въстание, romanized: Aprilsko vastanie) was an insurrection organised by the Bulgarians in the Ottoman Empire from April to May 1876. The rebellion was suppressed by irregular Ottoman bashi-bazouk units that engaged in indiscriminate slaughter of both rebels and non-combatants (see Batak massacre).

The American community around Robert College in Istanbul, the Protestant mission in Plovdiv headed by J.F. Clarke as well as two other Americans, journalist Januarius MacGahan and diplomat Eugene Schuyler, were indispensable in bringing knowledge of Ottoman atrocities to the wider European public.

Their reports of the events, which came to be known in the press as the Bulgarian Horrors and the Crime of the Century, caused a public outcry across Europe and mobilised both common folks and famous intellectuals to demand a reform of the failed Ottoman model of governance of the Bulgarian lands.

The shift in public opinion, in particular, in the Ottoman Empire's hitherto closest ally, the British Empire, eventually led to the re-establishment of a separate Bulgarian state in 1878.

== Background ==
In Europe, in the 18th century, the classic non-national states were the multi-ethnic empires such as the Ottoman Empire and the Austro-Hungarian Empire, whose population belonged to many ethnic groups and spoke many languages. The idea of nation state became more prominent during the 19th century. The most noticeable characteristic was the degree to which nation states used the state as an instrument of national unity in economic, social and cultural life. By the 18th century, the Ottomans had fallen well behind the rest of Europe in science, technology, and industry. However, the Bulgarian population was also suppressed socially and politically under Ottoman rule. Additionally, more immediate causes for the greater mobilisation compared to earlier revolts were the severe internal and external problems which the Ottoman Empire experienced in the middle of the 1870s. In 1875, taxes levied on non-Muslims were raised for fear of state bankruptcy, which, in turn, caused additional tension between Muslims and Christians and led to the Herzegovinian rebellion and the Stara Zagora revolt in Bulgaria. The failure of the Ottomans to handle the Herzegovinian uprising successfully showed the weakness of the Ottoman state, and the atrocities committed during its suppression discredited it internationally. In the late 19th century, European ideas of nationalism were adopted by the Bulgarian elite.

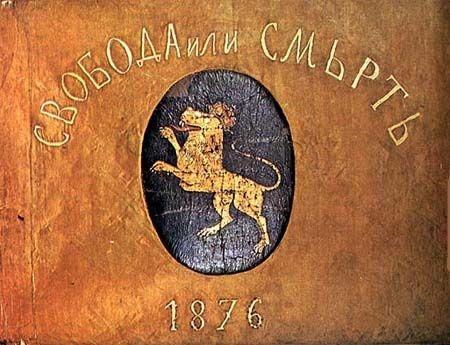
Rebel flag from Gorna Oryahovitsa. The text reads 'Свобода или смърть' (Freedom or Death).

== Preparation ==
In November 1875, activists of the Bulgarian Revolutionary Central Committee met in the Romanian town of Giurgiu and decided that the political situation was suitable for a general uprising. The uprising was scheduled for April or May 1876. The territory of the country was divided into five revolutionary districts with centers in Vratsa (leader-Stoyan Zaimov), Veliko Tarnovo (Stefan Stambolov), Sliven (Ilarion Dragostinov), Plovdiv (Panayot Volov—who later gave his position to his assistant Georgi Benkovski) and Sofia (Nikola Obretenov).

The rebels had been hoarding arms and ammunition for some time and even constructed a makeshift cannon out of cherry-wood.

In the progress of the preparation of the uprising, the organisers gave up the idea of a fifth revolutionary district in Sofia due to the deplorable situation of the local revolutionary committees and moved the centre of the fourth revolutionary district from Plovdiv to Panagyurishte. On 14 April 1876, a general meeting of the committees from the fourth revolutionary district was held in the Oborishte locality near Panagyurishte to discuss the proclamation of the insurrection. However, one of the delegates disclosed the plot to the Ottoman authorities. As a result, the Ottoman police made an attempt to arrest the leader of the local revolutionary committee in Koprivshtitsa, Todor Kableshkov on 2 May [O.S. 20 April] 1876.

The Bulgarian Revolutionary Central Committee's minutes from 17th of April 1876 chaired by Benkovski discuss retaliation against the Turkish and Muslim population in mixed regions opposing the uprising. These actions include killing, arson of property and homes and seizure of assets. On the other hand, Muslims who did not resist were to be protected in the same way as the Bulgarian population. The committee also gave approval for torching towns and villages. However, there is no evidence that this plan was implemented.

== Outbreak and suppression ==
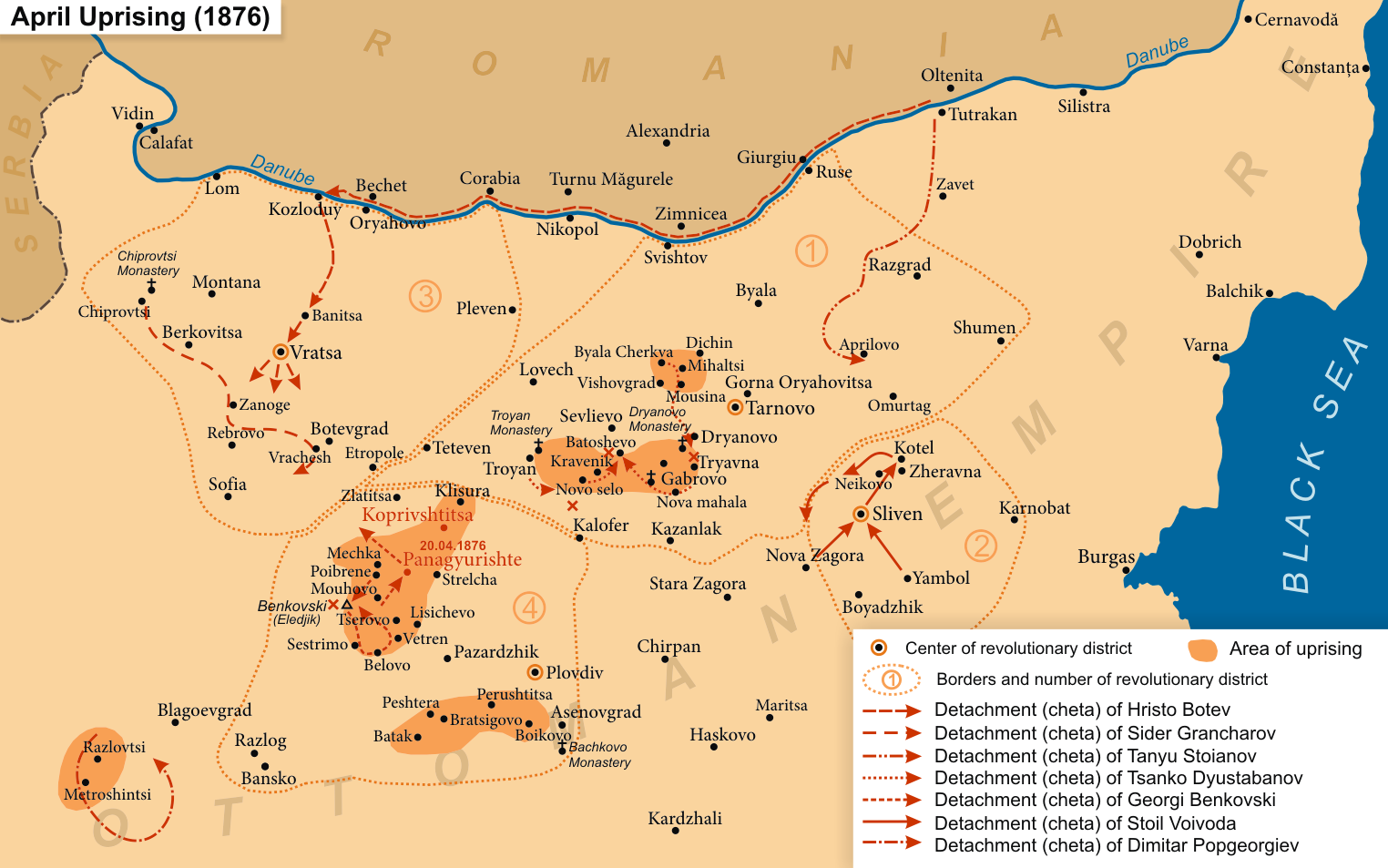
April Uprising

In conformity with the decisions taken at Oborishte, the local rebel committee attacked and surrounded the headquarters of the Ottoman police in Koprivshtitsa on 20 April 1876. At least two Ottoman police officers were killed, and the commander, Necip Aga, was forced to release arrested rebel suspects. Necip Aga and his close officials managed to escape the siege. However, due to this incident, the Bulgarian rebels had to proclaim the insurrection two weeks in advance of the planned date.

Within several days, the rebellion spread to the entire Sredna Gora and to a number of towns and villages in the northwestern Rhodopes. The insurrection broke out in the other revolutionary districts, though on a much smaller scale. The areas of Gabrovo, Tryavna, and Pavlikeni also revolted in force, along with several villages north and south of Sliven and near Berovo (in present-day North Macedonia).

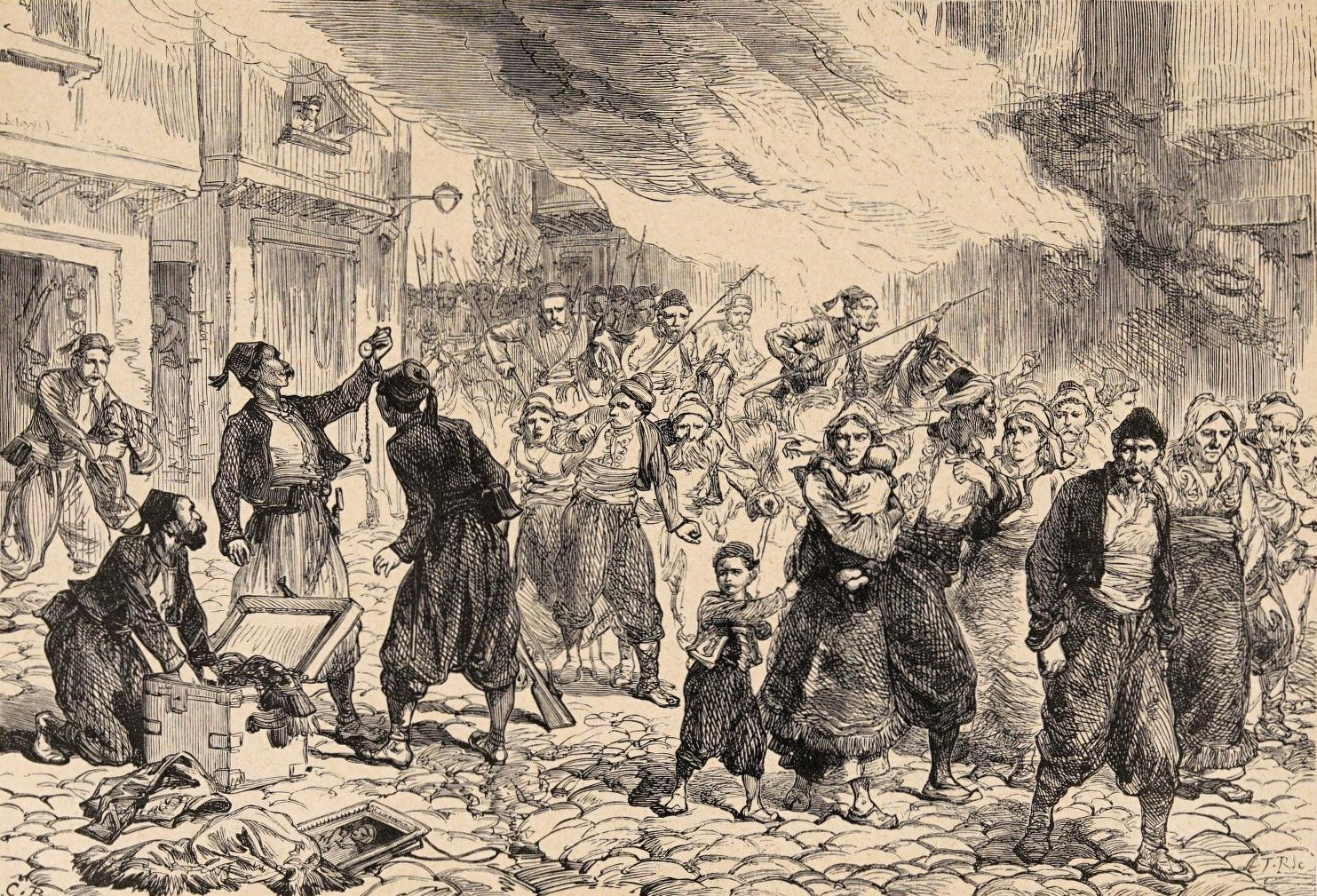
Burning and sack of Batak in 1876

The Ottoman response was immediate and severe. Irregular bashi-bazouks, sometimes accompanied by army detachments, were swiftly mobilized. These forces attacked the first insurgent towns as early as 25 April. The Ottomans massacred civilian populations, the principal places being Panagurishte, Perushtitza, Klisura, and Batak (see Batak massacre). By the middle of May, the insurrection was completely suppressed. One of the last sparks of resistance was poet Hristo Botev's attempt to come to the rebels' rescue with a detachment of Bulgarian political émigrés resident in Romania, which ended with the unit's rout and Botev's death.

Nevertheless, a unit of Circassian paramilitaries managed to commit a final atrocity well after the end of hostilities. They butchered 145 non-combatants at Boyadzhik after confusing the preparation for a Bulgarian holiday with a rebellion in the making.

The Porte's refusal to send additional regular army detachments, and the decision of the Beys of Edirne and Filibe to instead arm bashi-bazouk forces greatly determined the number of casualties and the aftermath of the uprising's suppression. Thus, the village of Bratsigovo, which was one of the best prepared centres of the rebellion and managed to fiercely resist enemy attacks for days, suffered only 250 casualties, very few of whom civilian, after fighting a regular Ottoman army unit. The leader of the Bratsigovo resistance, Vasil Petleshkov, also assumed all blame for what had happened. By contrast, Perushtitza, Panagurishte and Batak, which faced bashi-bazouk forces, all suffered enormous casualties, estimated by Schuyler at approx. 1,000, 3,000 and 5,000, respectively.

Schuyler qualified the uprising as poorly prepared and undeserving of the brutality of the Ottoman response. Modern Bulgarian historiography also calls it premature and poorly prepared and considers that the organisers only wanted to draw European and Russian public attention to the plight of Ottoman Bulgarians, with no illusions that the revolt would succeed.

In view of the poor preparation of the insurgents, but the enormous repercussions of their deeds, American Protestant missionary and author Henry Otis Dwight called the revolt "the maddest freak that ever led men to death".

== Casualties ==
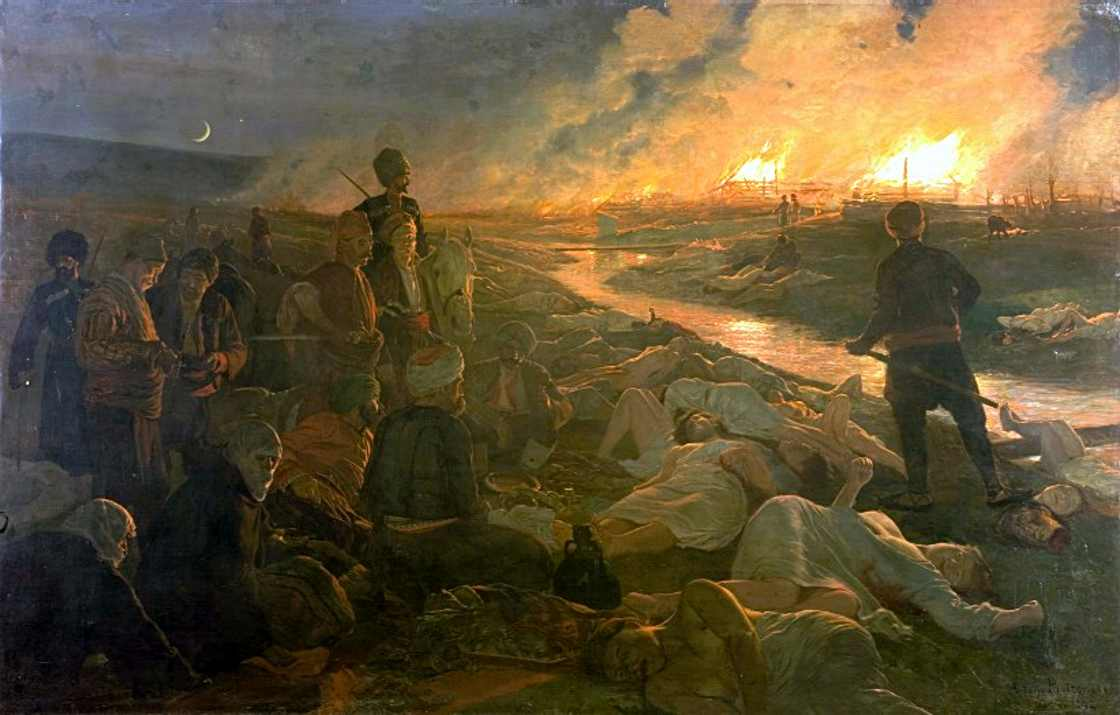
The Batak massacre (1889), painted by Antoni Piotrowski.

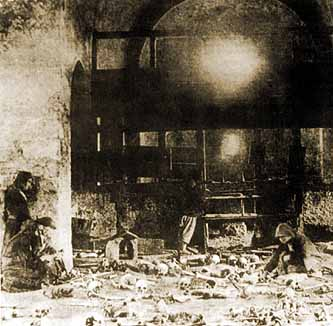
The interior of the church in Batak two years after the bloody suppression of the April Uprising and the massacre of the inhabitants of the village. Photographer and exact date not known.

The most detailed contemporary account of the uprising was prepared by American diplomat Eugene Schuyler. He learned about the events from faculty members at Robert College, who feared that the coming investigation of Englishman Walter Baring would turn into a cover-up because of the British Empire's strongly pro-Ottoman official stance and his own reputation as a Turkophile.

After visiting 3 cities and 11 villages, Schuyler compiled a report detailing the burning of sixty-five villages, the demolition of five monasteries and the slaughter of at least 15,000 people—rebels and non-combatants alike. However, what Schuyler emphasised the most was the exceptional, highly unnecessary brutality employed, in particular, at Batak. Eventually, despite his reputation as a Turkophile, Baring by and large confirmed Schuyler's findings. The report of his investigation only reduced the estimated number of victims to 12,000.

Januarius MacGahan also put the number of Bulgarian casualties at 15,000, with the reservation that the figure does not cover the insurrection north of the Balkan Mountains. Subsequent investigations by the French and Russian Consuls estimated the number of Bulgarian casualties at 25,000–40,000. In mid-June 1876, Turkish sources claimed some 18,000 casualties, and Bulgarian ones 30,000.

According to Baring, the civilian Muslim population was not materially affected by the rebellion. This is also substantiated in the reports of Eugene Schuyler and James F. Clarke, who testify that very few peaceful Muslims were killed. According to Schuyler, Muslim casualties numbered 115, of whom 12 women and children. Ottoman officials at the time claimed approx. 500 Muslim casualties.

While contemporary witnesses are unanimous on the scale of destruction of human life and property among the rebels and agree that there were few Muslim casualties, there is disagreement on both issues among modern Western historians. Some of them not only take issue with the number of Muslim victims but also disparage or negate Bulgarian casualties.

Thus, American historian Justin McCarthy claims that more than 1,000 Muslims were slaughtered and many more expelled during the revolt, while putting Bulgarian casualties at 3,000–12,000. He also stresses that Russian atrocities against Muslims during the Russo-Turkish War of 1877–1878 were far worse than those against insurgent Bulgarians. In History of the Ottoman Empire and Modern Turkey, Stanford Shaw claims that far more Muslims than Christians were killed in the uprising. He also estimates Bulgarian casualties at fewer than 4,000.

On the other hand, Barbara Jelavich, who admits that the beginning of the April Uprising was accompanied by a massacre of Muslim civilians, upholds Baring's estimate of 12,000 Bulgarian casualties. According to British historian Richard Shannon, the insurgents killed less than 200 Muslims, very few of whom were non-combatants.

According to the report written by Schuyler and American journalist Januarius MacGahan, the Ottoman government at the time did not claim more than 500 Muslims killed—most of whom in battle. Polish scholar Tomasz Kamusella opines that the numbers of victims may not distinguish between Orthodox Christians and Muslims, but acknowledges that there were only some 500 Muslim deaths.

This is countered by American historian Richard Millman, who states that Schuyler visited in person only 11 of the villages he reported on, even though Schuyler himself admits that on the first page of his report. However, it is certain that Schuyler visited Batak and other towns and villages that suffered a particularly gruesome fate, e.g., Perushtitsa and Panagyurishte. Millman also claims that the accepted reality of the massacres is largely a myth.

McCarthy, Shaw and Millman all blame the accounts of Baring, MacGahan, Schuyler and Gladstone's actions on a colonial mindset, an ingrained anti-Turkish bias, "othering", preconceived ideas of Turkish barbarism and guilt or, at best, on pro-Russian leaning. McCarthy has since dedicated an entire book to the issue, where he attributes all negative perceptions of Turkey in the US to 19th century American missionaries—such as pastor James F. Clarke, who first gave an alert about the treatment of the Bulgarian rebels.

However, McCarthy, Shaw and Millman have in turn themselves been accused by fellow Western historians of being an "apologist for the Turkish state", of having "an indefensible bias toward the Turkish official position" (McCarthy), of suffering from a "Turkish-nationalist bias", of offering a "vehemently anti-Armenian and Hellenophobic interpretation of modern Turkish history" (Shaw), of "being irredeemably pro-Turkish and pro-Disraeli" (Millman), etc. multiple times throughout their careers. Most relevant in the context of the April Uprising's casualty figures is fellow historian Hakem Al-Rustom's critique that

"Justin McCarthy is an apologist for the Turkish state and supports the official version of history, which denies the Armenian genocide. He thus might have exaggerated the number of Muslim victims in the Balkans in order to underplay the number of Armenian victims in Anatolia."

Both McCarthy and Shaw are Armenian Genocide denialists. McCarthy is also a member of, and has received grants from, the Institute of Turkish Studies.

Contemporary Bulgarian historians generally accept the number of Bulgarian casualties at the end of the uprising to be around 30,000. According to British and French figures, 12,000–15,000 Bulgarian civilians were massacred during the uprising.

== Reaction in the West ==
=== Press reports ===
News of massacres of Bulgarians reached European embassies in Istanbul in May and June 1876 through Bulgarian students at Robert College, the American college in the city. Faculty members at Robert College wrote to the British Ambassador and to the Istanbul correspondents of The Times and the Daily News.

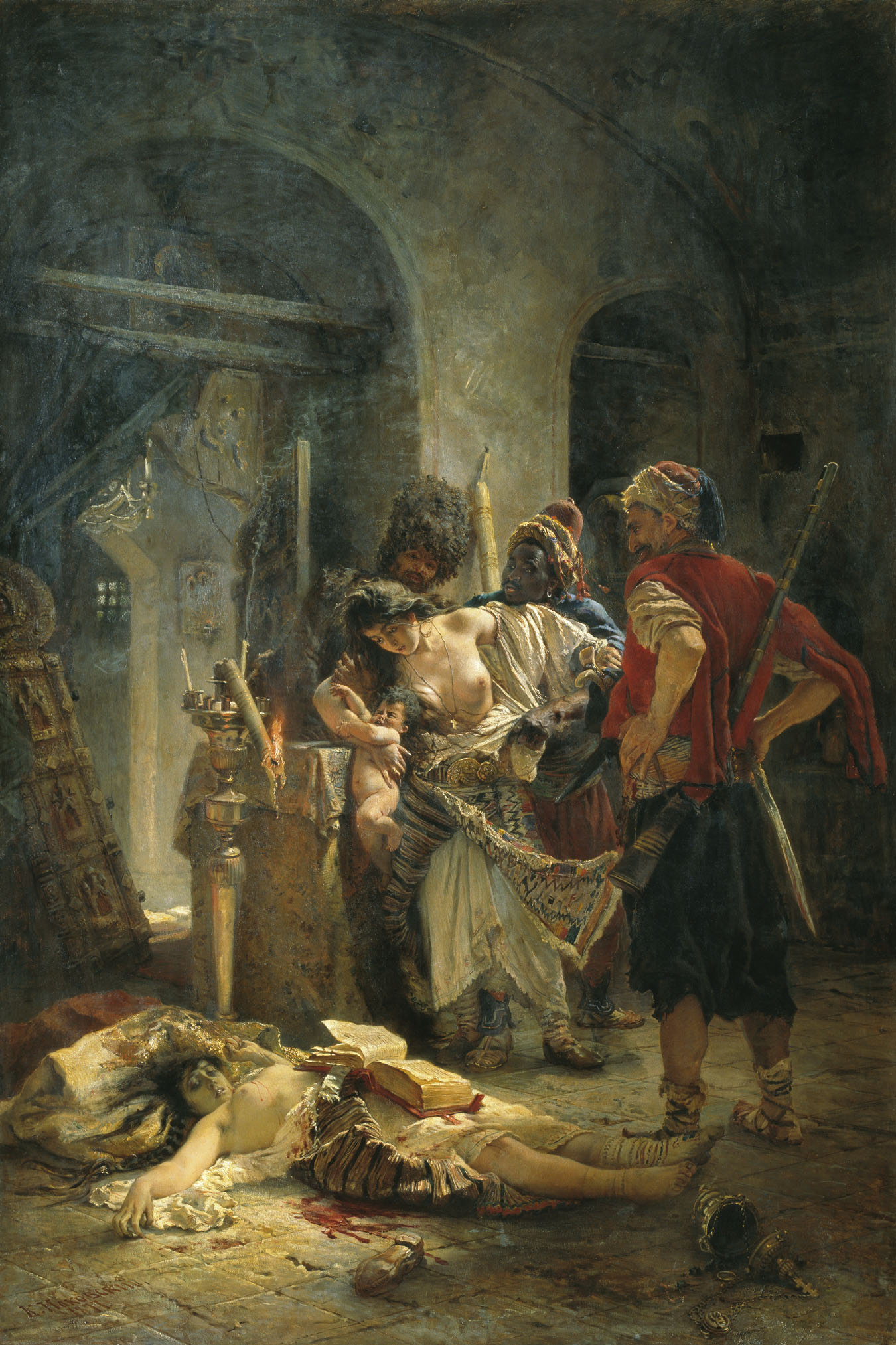
Konstantin Makovsky (1839–1915). The Bulgarian Martyresses (1877)

But let me tell you what we saw at Batak ... The number of children killed in these massacres is something enormous. They were often spitted on bayonets, and we have several stories from eye-witnesses who saw the little babes carried about the streets, both here and at Olluk-Kni, on the points of bayonets. The reason is simple. When a Mohammedan has killed a certain number of infidels he is sure of Paradise, no matter what his sins may be ... It was a heap of skulls, intermingled with bones from all parts of the human body, skeletons nearly entire and rotting, clothing, human hair and putrid flesh lying there in one foul heap, around which the grass was growing luxuriantly. It emitted a sickening odour, like that of a dead horse, and it was here that the dogs had been seeking a hasty repast when our untimely approach interrupted them ... The ground is covered here with skeletons, to which are clinging articles of clothing and bits of putrid flesh. The air was heavy, with a faint, sickening odour, that grows stronger as we advance. It is beginning to be horrible.

— Eyewitness account of J. A. MacGahan on Turkish atrocities in Bulgaria, in a letter to the London Daily News of August 22, 1876

An article about the massacres in the Daily News on 23 June provoked a question in Parliament about Britain's support for Turkey, and demands for an investigation. Prime Minister Benjamin Disraeli promised to conduct an investigation about what had really happened.

In July, the British Embassy in Istanbul sent a second secretary, Walter Baring, to Bulgaria to investigate the stories of atrocities. Baring did not speak Bulgarian (although he did speak Turkish) and British policy was officially pro-Turkish, so the Bulgarian community in Istanbul feared he would not report the complete story. They asked the American Consul in Istanbul, Eugene Schuyler, to conduct his own investigation.

Schuyler set off for Bulgaria on 23 July, four days after Baring. He was accompanied by a well-known American war correspondent, Januarius MacGahan, by a German correspondent, and by a Russian diplomat, Prince Aleksei Tseretelev.

Schuyler's group spent three weeks visiting Batak and other villages where massacres had taken place. Schuyler's official report, published in November 1876, said that fifty-eight villages in Bulgaria had been destroyed, five monasteries demolished, and fifteen thousand people in all massacred. The report was reprinted as a booklet and widely circulated in Europe.

Baring's report to the British government about the massacres was similar but put the number of victims at about twelve thousand.

MacGahan's vivid articles from Bulgaria moved British public opinion against Turkey. He described in particular what he had seen in the town of Batak, where five thousand of a total of seven thousand residents had been slaughtered, beheaded or burned alive by Turkish irregulars, and their bodies left in piles around the town square and the church.

=== British response ===
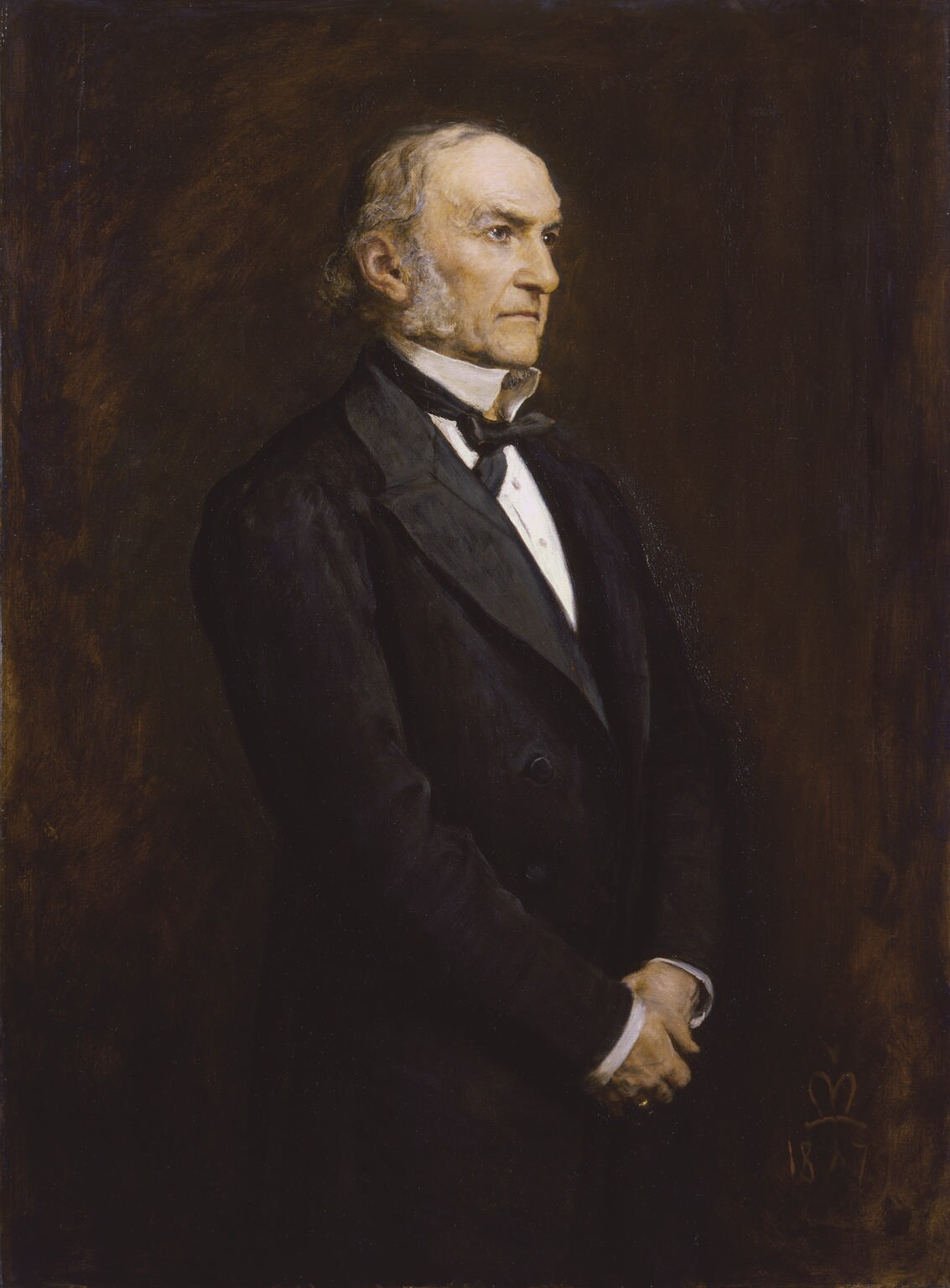
Portrait of William Ewart Gladstone painted by John Everett Millais, 1879.

Liberal Party leader William Ewart Gladstone published a pamphlet on 6 September 1876, Bulgarian Horrors and the Question of the East, in which he attacked the Disraeli government for its indifference to the Ottoman Empire's violent repression of the April Uprising. Gladstone made clear his hostility focused on the Turkish people, rather than on the Muslim religion. The Turks he said:

"... were, upon the whole, from the black day when they first entered Europe, the one great anti-human specimen of humanity. Wherever they went, a broad line of blood marked the track behind them; and as far as their dominion reached, civilisation disappeared from view. They represented everywhere government by force, as opposed to government by law. For the guide of this life they had a relentless fatalism: for its reward hereafter, a sensual paradise."

The political impact of the reports was immediate and dramatic. As the leader of the opposition, Gladstone called upon the government to withdraw its support for Turkey.

"I entreat my countrymen", he wrote, "upon whom far more than upon any other people in Europe it depends, to require and to insist that our government, which has been working in one direction, shall work in the other, and shall apply all its vigour to concur with the states of Europe in obtaining the extinction of the Turkish executive power in Bulgaria. Let the Turks now carry away their abuses in the only possible manner, namely, by carrying off themselves ..."

Prominent Europeans, including Charles Darwin, Oscar Wilde, Victor Hugo, and Giuseppe Garibaldi, spoke against the Turkish behavior in Bulgaria. When war with Russia started in 1877, the Turkish Government asked Britain for help, but the British government refused, citing public outrage caused by the Bulgarian massacres as the reason.

=== Political affairs and propaganda ===
During the 19th century, the British Empire typically supported Ottomans in their conflicts against the Russian Empire, a common rival at the time, to curb its pan-Slavist and Orthodox Christian influence in the Balkans. William Gladstone assumed a pro-Russian position on the conflict and was not concerned with the expansion of Russia's power projection. In contrast, the works of Frederick Burnaby present a pro-Turkish understanding of events. To investigate the accounts of massacres in British media, Burnaby embarked on a travel through Ottoman lands; his memoirs were published under the titles A Ride to Khiva: Travels and Adventures in Central Asia (1876) and On Horseback through Asia Minor (1877). According to Burnaby, many Western accounts of atrocities were exaggerated and sometimes fabricated and atrocities against Muslims were omitted from the press reports. The landlord of Burnaby in Ankara complains to him about this as such,

Your newspapers always published the accounts of the Bulgarian women and children who were slaughtered, and never went into any particulars about the Turkish women who were massacred by the Bulgarians, or about our soldiers whose noses were cut off, and who were mutilated by the insurgents in the Herzegovina. A Turk values his nose quite as much as a Christian.

Burnaby's goal was to present a counter-narrative to the general Russophile attitude in Britain. According to Turkish historian Sinan Akıllı, his attempts manifested mixed results and were only partially successful in reversing the public opinion.

=== Aftermath ===
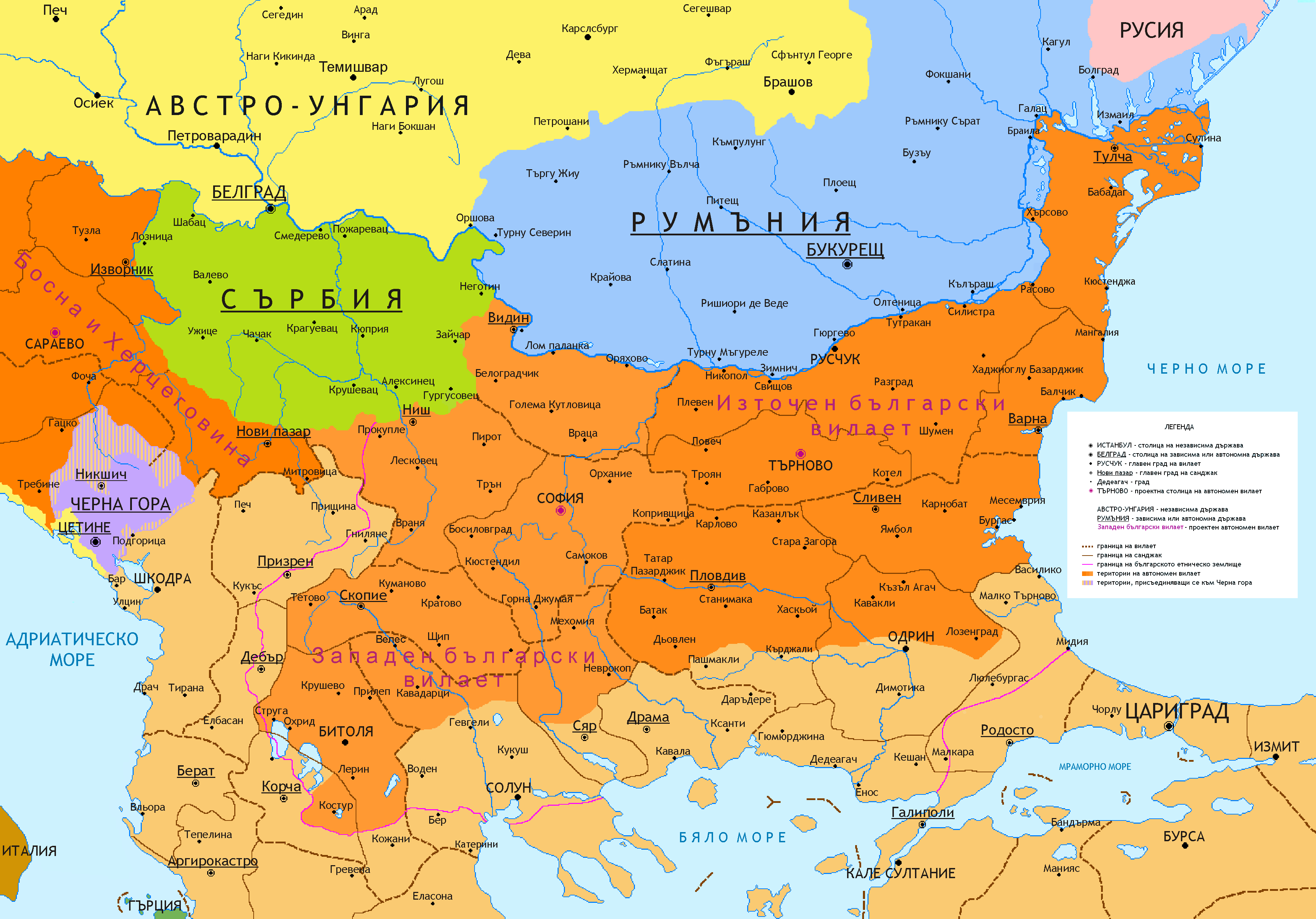
Boundaries of the Bulgarian autonomous provinces proposal tabled in Constantinople

The April uprising was not successful in itself, but its bloody suppression by the Ottomans caused such outrage across Europe that public opinion, even in Turcophile England, shifted, demanding a reform of the model of Ottoman governance. As a result, the Great Powers called the Constantinople Conference in December 1876, where they presented the Sultan with a combined proposal that envisaged the creation of two autonomous Bulgarian provinces, largely overlapping with the borders of the Bulgarian Exarchate. By splitting the autonomy in two and ensuring extensive international oversight of provincial affairs, the proposal reflected all of the British Empire's wishes and allayed its fears that the provinces would become Russian puppets.

Thus, the decades-long Bulgarian struggle for self-governance and freedom appeared to finally bear fruit. And this the Bulgarians had achieved—through the efforts of both clergy and the young Bulgarian bourgeoisie, which had successfully argued before and succeeded in convincing Grand Vizier Âli Pasha in the need for a separate Bulgarian church and millet, thus initiating the Bulgarian nation-building process even under foreign rule, and through the efforts of the revolutionaries who had managed to cause a seismic shift in European public opinion.

However, on 20 January 1877, Grand Vizier Midhat Pasha officially and finally rejected the autonomy proposal. Bulgarian historiography has traditionally cast the blame for the failure of the Conference on the go-to villain in modern Bulgarian history, the English. However, newer research rather indicates that the power that sabotaged the Conference was the Russian Empire itself. The Russians had already apportioned Ottoman holdings in Europe amongst themselves and Austria-Hungary by virtue of the secret Reichstadt Agreement and Budapest Convention and stood to lose the most from a Bulgarian state that was not under their control—namely, their century-old dream of controlling the Turkish Straits and having a warm-water port (a.k.a. Catherine the Great's "Greek Plan").

The date of finalisation of the Budapest Convention, 15 January 1877, mere five days before Midhat Pasha's rejection of the autonomy proposal, and its clauses, where the Russian Empire explicitly undertakes not to create a large Slavic state but rather two small autonomous Bulgarian principalities/provinces north and south of the Balkan Mountains have even caused several researchers to call the Treaty of San Stefano a "trick" or a "charade".

Whatever the truth, the Ottoman Empire's rejection of the autonomy proposal gave the Russians the much-desired excuse to declare war on the Ottoman Empire, while preventing the United Kingdom from interfering because of public opinion. Less than two years after the uprising, Bulgaria, or at least a part of it, would be free again.

== See also ==
- Ottoman Bulgaria
- Razlovtsi insurrection
- Liberation of Bulgaria
- Kresna–Razlog uprising
- Bulgarian unification
- Edwin Pears
- Boyadzhik massacre
