= Nikola Obretenov =

Bulgarian revolutionary

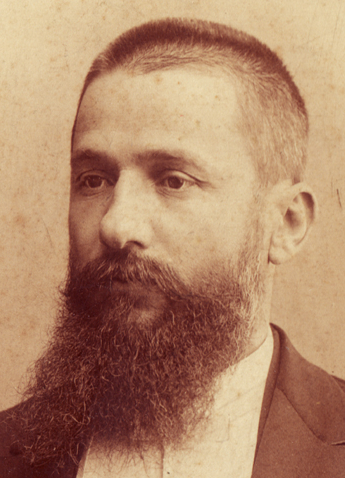
- Bulgarian revolutionary
- Born: 28 May 1849; Ruse, Ottoman Empire
- Died: 11 October 1939 (aged 90); Ruse, Kingdom of Bulgaria
- Parent(s): Tiho Obretenov; Tonka Obretenova

Nikola Tihov Obretenov (Bulgarian: Никола Тихов Обретенов; 28 May 1849 – 11 October 1939) was a Bulgarian revolutionary, one of the combatants for the liberation of Bulgaria, and a participant in the Stara Zagora Uprising and the April Uprising. His book "Memories About Bulgarian Uprisings" was published posthumously and is a primary source of historical information about those events.

== Biography ==
=== Early life ===
Nikola Obretenov was born on 28 May 1849 in Ruse, the administrative centre of Danube Province, Ottoman Empire, in the family of Tiho Obretenov — a wealthy and educated Bulgarian of that time — and Tonka Obretenova.

In January 1863, being a student in a local school, Nikola Obretenov took part in the expulsion of the Greek bishop Sinesiy. Next year he graduated, and in the autumn he went to his father in the village of Sakcha in Northern Dobruja (modern Romania). They established a Bulgarian school there, which existed until March 1866.

=== Involvement in revolutionary organizations ===
From November 1867 on, Nikola Obretenov was a librarian and a member of the board of trustees of the Zora cultural club, established in 1866 by Dragan Tsankov and other intellectuals. The club turned into one of BRCC's safe houses.

On 7 June 1871 Hristo "the bookbinder" Ivanov invited Nikola Obretenov to take part in the revolutionary struggle as a messenger between Bulgaria and BRCK in Bucharest. On 29 June 1871 Obretenov travelled to Bucharest to present his references to the chairman of BRCK, Lyuben Karavelov. After being approved by Karavelov, Nikola Obretenov along with Dimitar Gorov of Giurgiu developed an illegal channel for transferring mail, printed materials, and weapons between Bucharest–Giurgiu and Rousse.

Following Lyuben Karavelov's and Angel Kanchev's orders, Nikola Obretenov, Toma Kardzhiev, and Radi Ivanov established the Rousse private revolutionary committee. The constituent session of the committee took place on 10 December 1871 in Nikola Obretenov's (and baba Tonka's) house. The committee later admitted Georgi Ikonomov, Gancho Karamazhdrakov, Ilarion Dragostinov, Nikola Sakilarov, Zahari Stoyanov, Nikola Tabakov, and many others.

From 29 April to 4 May 1872 Nikola Obretenov was a delegate to the meeting in Bucharest. Twenty-five people — representatives of the private revolutionary committees of Bulgaria and Wallachia — took part. They accepted the new statutes of BRCK, re-elected Karavelov as a chairman of the Bucharest committee, and authorized Vasil Levski to form a "Temporary government" in Bulgaria, wherever he would find appropriate.

Near the end of June 1872, Nikola Obretenov transported the printed statutes, the receipts and other documents, as well as Levski's uniform, sabre, and gun through the developed illegal channel, assisted by baba Tonka, Petrana Obretenova, Todorka Mirazchieva, and Natalia Karavelova.

In 1873 Nikola Obretenov made an acquaintance with Stefan Stambolov, who expressed his willingness to get involved in the struggle as Vasil Levski's deputy.

On 20 August and 21 August 1874 Nikola Obretenov took part in BRCK's session in Bucharest, which re-elected Karavelov as a chairman of the committee, elected Hristo Botev as a secretary, and confirmed Stefan Stambolov as a chief apostle in Bulgaria and a deputy of Vasil Levski.

=== Stara Zagora uprising ===
In August 1875, Nikola Obretenov participated in BRCK's sessions, presided by Hristo Botev. A decision was made for Bulgaria to revolt in mid-September 1875. The country would be divided into the following regions:

- Rousse-Shumen region, including Varna and Razgrad with Nikola Obretenov as an apostle
- Stara Zagora region with Stefan Stambolov as an apostle
- Tarnovo region with Mihail Sarafov as an apostle
- Sliven region with Tanyu Stoyanov as an apostle
- Lovech-Troyan with Stoyan Dragnev as an apostle

Stoyan Zaimov was given the task to set Tsarigrad "on fire", Hristo Botev had to bring Filip Totyu along from Odessa, and Panayot Hitov was to negotiate with Belgrade. Until the outburst of the Stara Zagora uprising of 16 September 1875, Nikola Obretenov actively took part in the preparation of the Chervena Voda detachment and the training of population in nearby villages. After the uprising's suppression because of Andrey Momchev's treason, more than 1,000 people were captured. On 27 September 1875 Nikola Obretenov hid in the house of Karamihaylov, an interpreter in the Russian consulate, who organized his escape to Romania.

In September 1875 Dimitar Gorov gave accommodation to Nikola Obretenov and Stoyan Zaimov in Giurgiu, in a place they used to call "the barracks". In October Panayot Volov joined them. So did those who returned from Tsarigrad—Georgi Benkovski, Ivanitsa Danchov, and Hristo Karaminkov. Near the end of October, Stefan Stambolov and Ilarion Dragostinov came from Bucharest.

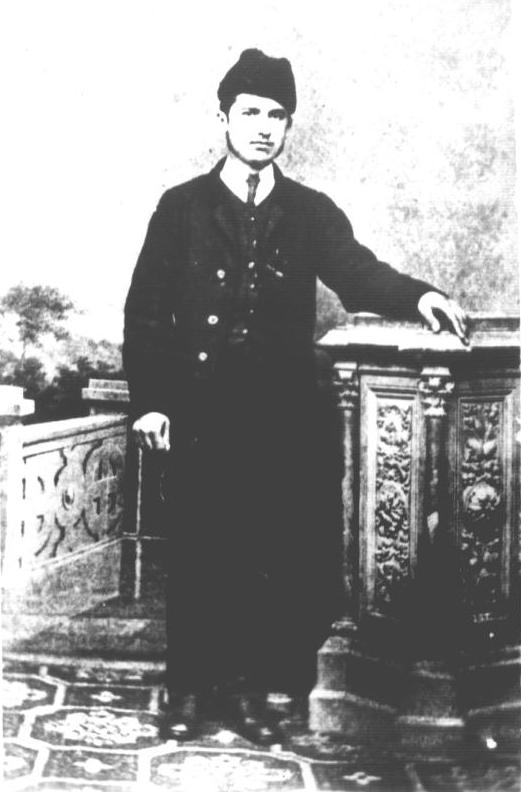

=== April uprising ===
In mid-November 1875, the Giurgiu revolutionary committee was established and started functioning, presided by Stefan Stambolov. Stoyan Zaimov was appointed as a secretary, and the members were Panayot Volov, Nikola Obretenov, Ilarion Dragostinov, Hristo Karaminkov, Georgi Apostolov, Georgi Ikonomov, Georgi Obretenov, and Georgi Izmirliev.

The sessions continued until 25 December 1875. A decision was made to prepare the April uprising, which was to break out on 11 May 1876. With that end in view, the country was divided into five regions (according to Nikola Obretenov):

1. Tarnovo region with apostles Stefan Stambolov, Georgi Izmirliev, Hristo Karaminkov, Hristo "the big" Ivanov
2. Sliven region with apostles Ilarion Dragostinov, Georgi Ikonomov, Georgi Obretenov, and Stoil voivoda
3. Plovdiv region with apostles Panayot Volov, Georgi Benkovski, Zahari Stoyanov, Todor Kableshkov
4. Sofia region with apostles Nikola Obretenov and Nikola Slavkov
5. Vratsa region with apostles Stoyan Zaimov and Georgi Apostolov

In the beginning of 1876 the "apostles" headed towards their designated revolutionary regions. On 24 January 1876 Nikola Obretenov and Georgi Apostolov crossed the Danube at Oryahovo and set off for Vratsa. There, taking into account the situation, Zaimov and Nikola Obretenov decided that he and Georgi Apostolov should return to Romania to buy weapons, which they could bring to Vratsa with reinforcements, when the uprising burst out. Nikola Obretenov and Georgi Apostolov, assisted by the Craiova revolutionary committee, bought weapons and ammunitions, and Hristo Botev passionately took up organizing the detachment.

And you, mother, never stop working hard for your people, never be afraid of anything and anyone. .. Don't you ever seek glory, but honour and justice—it is the most sacred thing on this world.

— Nikola Obretenov
in his farewell letter before
setting off with Botev's detachment

On Monday, 17 May 1876 Nikola Obretenov with the detachment led by Hristo Botev came ashore from the Radetzky steamship on the bank of Kozloduy, where the rebels, kissing their native soil, took their oaths under the flag, crafted by his sister Petrana Obretenova.

Nikola Obretenov fought in all of the detachment's battles. He was with Hristo Botev at the moment of his death on 20 May 1876. On 3 June 1927, as a member of a special commission, Nikola Obretenov ascertained the exact place of Hristo Botev's death, about which a written report was composed.

After a month of fighting, roaming, and starvation through the grim mountains, on 17 June Nikola Obretenov and his companions Sava Penev, Dimitar Todorov, and Stoyan Lovchaliyata were betrayed by the brothers Pencho and Petar, and a Turkish posse captured them in the "Balyuviya han" inn near Shipkovo, Troyan.

=== Exile and post-liberation activities ===
The court in Tarnovo sentenced the rebels to death. The sentence was not signed, and the convicts were sent to Rousse in order for an emergency court to judge them. The court sentenced them again to death by hanging. Nikola Obretenov and Stoyan Zaimov were driven about in the city with their sentences hung on their necks. By the sultan's order, the sentence was replaced with an exile for life in Asia Minor.

On 2 July 1876 in the St Jeanne d'Arc stronghold, Nikola Obretenov met his brother Angel, who had been in exile for eight years, for being a member of the detachment of Hadzhi Dimitar and Stefan Karadzha. Nikola Obretenov returned to his liberated fatherland in 1878, released by implication of the capitulations of the San Stefano treaty.

Nikola Obretenov was eager to participate in the construction of modern Bulgaria. He was a member of the Liberal Party, and later of the People's Liberal Party, continuing his cooperation with Stefan Stambolov. He served as a governor of Tutrakan, in Silistra Province. He actively took part in the suppression of the Russophile riots in both Tutrakan and Rousse.

In May 1907 Nikola Obretenov was elected to parliament, and as a mayor of Rousse.

He died at the age of 90, on 11 October 1939, a couple of days before the official celebration of his anniversary.

Nikola Obretenov is the author of many articles in the press and the author of the book "Memories about Bulgarian uprisings", published after his death, under the editorship of academician Mihail Arnaudov.
