= Richard Shannon (historian) =

New Zealand historian (1931–2022)

Richard Thomas Shannon (10 June 1931 – 19 February 2022) was an historian best known for his two-volume biography of William Ewart Gladstone. He was appointed Professor of Modern History at the University College Swansea, University of Wales in 1979.

He was born in Fiji, acquired his first degree at the University of Auckland, New Zealand, and a PhD at Gonville and Caius College, Cambridge. He taught modern history at Auckland and then at the University of East Anglia before moving to Swansea.

He died on 19 February 2022 at the age of 90.

== Works ==
- Gladstone and the Bulgarian Agitation 1876 (London: Nelson, 1963), introduction by George Kitson Clark
- The Crisis of Imperialism, 1865-1915 (London: Hart-Davis McGibbon, 1974).
- Gladstone: Peel's Inheritor, 1809-1865 (London: Hamish Hamilton, 1982). vol. 1
- The Age of Disraeli, 1868-1881: The Rise of Tory Democracy (London: Longman, 1992)
- "The Blind Victorian: Henry Fawcett and British Liberalism." English Historical Review 108.426 (1993): 239–241.
- The Age of Salisbury, 1881-1902: Unionism and Empire (London: Longman, 1996).
- Gladstone: Heroic Minister 1865 - 1898 (London: Allen Lane, 1999). vol. 2
- "Peel, Gladstone and Party." Parliamentary History 18.3 (1999): 317-52
- Gladstone: God and Politics (London: Hambledon Continuum, 2007).
