= Panayot Volov =

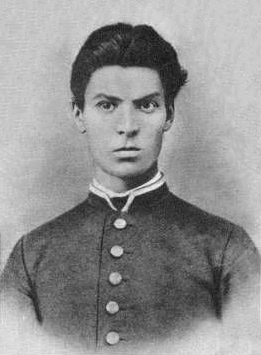
- Born: c.1850 Shumen, Ottoman Empire (now Bulgaria)
- Died: 26 May 1876 (aged 26) near Byala, Ottoman Empire (now Bulgaria)

Panayot Volov (Bulgarian: Панайот Волов; c.1850 – 26 May 1876), also known under pseudonym Petar Vankov (Bulgarian: Петър Ванков)), was the organizer and leader of the Gyurgevo Revolutionary Committee of the Bulgarian April Uprising against the Ottoman Empire in 1876.

== Biography ==
Volov was born in 1850 in Shumen, where he finished Dobri Voynikov's class school. He then continued his education in Bucharest, Bolhrad and Odessa with the financial support of his wealthy relative Marincho Benli. Six months prior to his graduation from the South Slavic boarding school in Mykolaiv, which he attended between 1869 and 1873, Volov was forced to return to Shumen due to an illness. He was appointed head teacher and director of the local class school. He also organized a night school and took an active part in the activities of the local cultural centre (chitalishte). Volov also conducted revolutionary work in Shumen and the region.

In August 1874, Volov participated in the general assembly of the Bulgarian Revolutionary Central Committee in Bucharest and was chosen as the chairman of the Shumen local revolutionary committee. He created many local committee centers. Volov used his position as a school inspector for revolutionary purposes. Volov was arrested and sent to prison for his participation in the conflict between the local youth and the European engineers working on the Kaspichan–Shumen–Yambol railway. Volov headed the dissatisfied locals who cancelled the wedding of a French engineer with a local girl – she as model of beauty to Bulgarian girls. Following several months in prison, Volov was released and went to Romania.

Panayot Volov took part in the organization of the unsuccessful Stara Zagora Uprising of 1875. He was among the co-founders and most active workers of the Gyurgevo Revolutionary Committee. He was appointed the main "apostle" of the 4th revolutionary district in Plovdiv, but after contradictions between him and his assistant Georgi Benkovski Volov gave up the leadership.

Volov was one of the initiators of the Oborishte Assembly of the 4th district near Panagyurishte. When the April Uprising broke out, Volov was in Panagyurishte, where he incited the locals to support the rebellion together with other "apostles". He organised the rebel army of Klisura with a cherry cannon and tried to raise the villages of Karlovo and Koprivstica to revolt, getting into several battles with the bands of the Ottomans militia (bashibosuk) along the way. In vain, the poorly armed 200 rebels could not, with their cherry cannon (firing to 20-30 meters), oppose the well-trained and modernly armed Ottoman army (of 10 000 soldiers), which had German "Krupp" cannons firing at 1000 meters. After three hours of fighting, the rebels were forced to retreat positions from the hill of the Klisura, Еvil Valey (Zli Dol, to Bulgarian - Зли Дол). The Ottoman army captured and burned Klisura and the uprising was suppressed with much bloodshed. Following the uprising's utter defeat, he was betrayed to the Ottoman authorities during their attempt to flee to Romania and drowned in the Yantra River near Byala on 26 May 1876.

== Honours ==
Volov Peak on Davis Coast in Antarctica is named after him, as well as the football club FC Volov Shumen and its home stadium, Stadion Panayot Volov.
