= Tonka Obretenova =

Bulgarian revolutionary

Tonka Postavchiyata-Obretenova
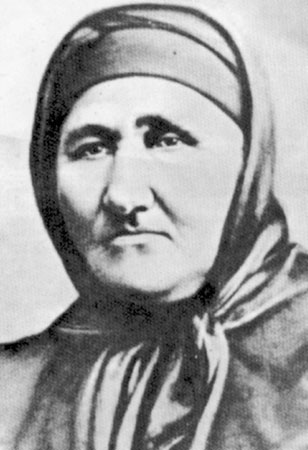
- Born: c. 1812 assumed Rousse, Ottoman Empire
- Died: 27 March 1893; Rousse, Bulgaria
- Spouse: Tiho Obretenov

Tonka Obretenova (Bulgarian: Тонка Обретенова), known as Baba Tonka (Баба Тонка), was a female Bulgarian revolutionary, born in about 1812 in Rousse.

Her parents, Toncho Postavchiyata (Тончо Поставчията) and Minka Toncheva (Минка Тончева), were from the village of Cherven. She married Tiho Obretenov — a famous tailor and tradesman in Rousse. They had seven children (five sons and two daughters), all of whom participated in the Bulgarian revolutionary movement. Obretenova herself lent major support to the revolutionary committee - she was famous for sheltering a number of revolutionary leaders. The Rousse Revolutionary Committee, the most important one in the interior of Bulgaria, was established by her son Nikola Obretenov, in her house. Baba Tonka buried Stefan Karadzha and managed to preserve his skull.

Her sons Angel, Petar, Nikola, and Georgi (Ангел, Петър, Никола и Георги) took part in different detachments and were killed, or sent into long exile. Her younger daughter, Anastasiya (Анастасия; also called: Siya, Сия) married Zahari Stoyanov, a revolutionary, writer and publicist.

Baba Tonka Cove in Livingston Island in the South Shetland Islands, Antarctica is named after Tonka Obretenova.
