= Tsargrad =

Slavic name for Constantinople

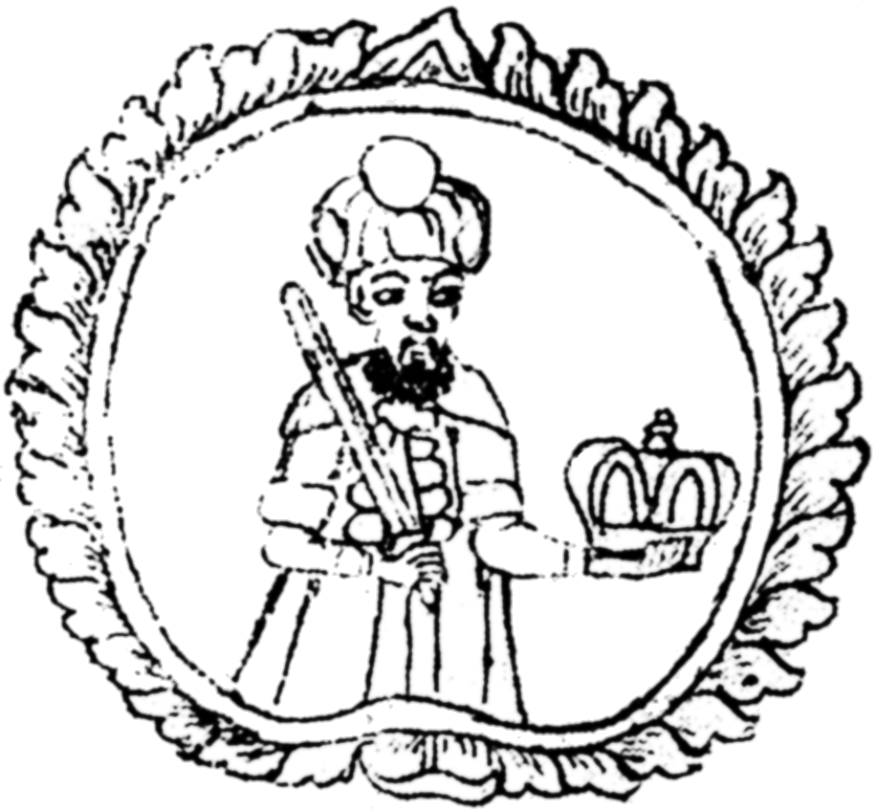
Selim II with the "crown of Tsarigrad", in a 1757 illustration by Wallachia's Constantin Săidăcar of Mogoșoaia

Tsargrad (or Tsarigrad, Tsargorod, Czargrad or Tzargrad) is a Slavic name for the city or land of Constantinople (present-day Istanbul in Turkey), the capital of the Byzantine Empire.

== Variations ==
The terms Tsargrad, Tsarigrad, Tsargorod, etc. are rendered in several ways depending on the language, for instance:

- Old East Slavic: Цѣсарьградъ, romanized: Tsěsarĭgradŭ;
- Church Slavonic: Царьгра̀дъ, romanized: Tsarĭgràdŭ;
- Belarusian: Царгорад, romanized: Tsarhorad;
- Russian: Царьгра́д, romanized: Tsar'grád;
- Ukrainian: Царгород, romanized: Tsarhorod;
- South Slavic languages: Carigrad / Tsarigrad or Цариград, depending on their alphabets;
- Czech: Cařihrad;
- Slovak: Carihrad;
- Polish: Carogród.

Tsargrad is an Old Church Slavonic translation of the Greek Βασιλὶς Πόλις. Combining the Slavonic words tsar for "caesar / emperor" and grad for "city", it meant "imperial city". According to Per Thomsen, the Old East Slavic form influenced an Old Norse appellation of Constantinople, Miklagard (Мikligarðr).

== Usage in Russian ==
In the Russian language, the term Tsargrad became an important piece of vocabulary in the political ideologies of Panslavists, Orthodox Christian fundamentalists, and early Russian nationalists. Constantinople/Tsargrad was the "Second Rome" in the line of thinking that made Moscow the "Third Rome", thus giving the recapture of Constantinople by a majority-Christian country a potential proof of great power status for Russia.

The obsession by the Russian political elite with Tsargrad did not wane going into the fin de siècle period, and the capture of the city became an important Russian war goal in World War I (1914–1918). On the backdrop of the Straits Question, religious antipathy towards the majority-Muslim Ottoman Empire and the reputation of Constantinople as the capital city of the Eastern Orthodox Church combined with the geostrategic interest to secure the Bosporus and the Dardanelles and thus the security of Russia's maritime route from the Black Sea to the Mediterranean. This strategic interest did not always cleanly overlap with religious affiliations; when the Bulgarian army approached Constantinople during the First Balkan War (1912/13) in the hopes of capturing the city for majority-Orthodox Bulgaria, the Russian government pressured its Bulgarian counterpart to abstain from the conquest of the city. The Russian leadership had no interest in the potential prestige to be gained from control of Constantinople to pass to another Orthodox country besides Russia itself. During World War I, the Russian public remained positively predisposed towards a potential conquest of Constantinople by Russia; Maurice Paléologue noted his observation that the population of Petrograd was hesitant around 1915/16 to accept the prospect of an outcome of the war that would not yield the city's conquest.

Though religious motives were less important to the leaders of the Soviet Union, the post-1917 government nonetheless inherited its predecessor's strategic interests in the Turkish Straits, hoping to gain access to global maritime shipping routes.

In modern Russia, one namesake of Tsargrad is Tsargrad TV, a Russian television channel which supports the ruling party from a perspective of Orthodox religious conservatism.

== Usage in Bulgarian ==
Bulgarians also applied the word to Tarnovgrad (Tsarevgrad Tarnov, "Imperial City of Tarnov"), one of the capitals of the tsars of the Bulgarian Empire, but after the Balkans came under Ottoman rule, the Bulgarian word has been used exclusively as another name of Constantinople.

As the zeitgeist which spawned the term has faded, the word Tsargrad is now an archaic term in Russian. It is however still used occasionally in Bulgarian, particularly in a historical context. A major traffic artery in Bulgaria's capital Sofia carries the name Tsarigradsko shose ("Tsarigrad Road"); the road begins as the Tsar Osvoboditel Boulevard and continues into the main highway that leads southeast to Istanbul. The name Tsarigrad is also retained in word groups such as tsarigradsko grozde ("Tsarigrad grapes", meaning "gooseberry"), the dish tsarigradski kyuftentsa ("small Tsarigrad koftas") or sayings like "One can even get to Tsarigrad by asking". In Slovene it is still largely used and often preferred over the official name. People also understand and sometimes use the name Carigrad in Bosnia, Croatia, North Macedonia, Montenegro and Serbia.

== Non-Slavic usage ==
The Romance language Romanian borrowed the term as Țarigrad, due to the long tradition of Church Slavonic in Romania, but it is an archaic usage now that has been replaced by Constantinopol and Istanbul. Nowadays, a village in Moldova is called Țarigrad.

== See also ==
- Names of Istanbul
- Constantinople
- Constantinople Agreement
- Third Rome
