= Greatest Croatian =

Croatian opinion poll

The Greatest Croatian (Croatian: Najveći Hrvat) is an open-access poll, conducted over five weeks in 2003 by the Croatian weekly Nacional.

The public was invited to vote either via the magazine's website, text messages or postcards to determine the "Greatest Croatian" in history. Almost 8,000 votes were received during the course of the poll (6,507 via Internet, 520 text messages and 752 postcards), and the final results were published in the magazine's 6 January 2004 issue.

== Final list ==
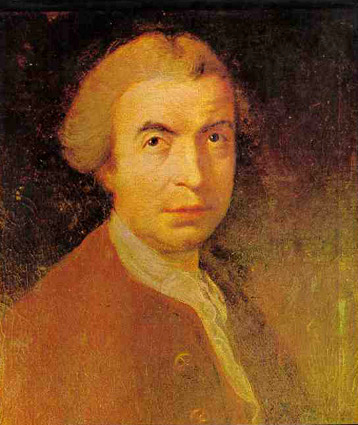
Ruđer Bošković, #3

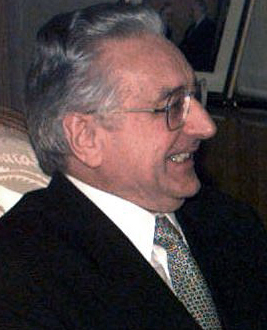
Franjo Tuđman, #5

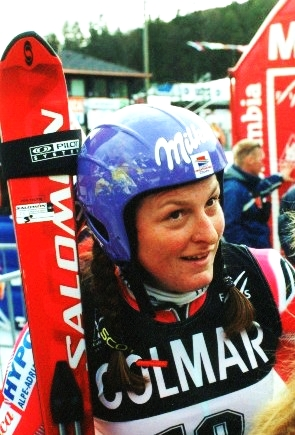
Janica Kostelić, #17

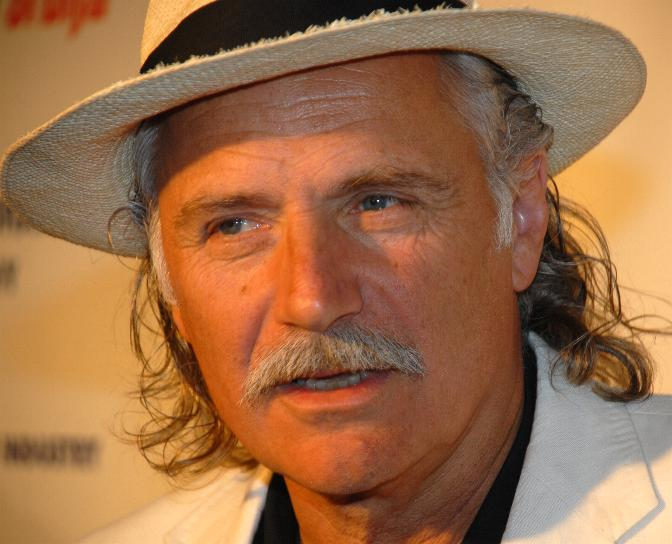
Rade Šerbedžija, #23

Due to the nature of the poll used to select and rank, the results do not pretend to be an objective assessment. The poll also had no rules on ethnicity or nationality of candidates, with readers free to send in votes for whomever they felt contributed to the history and society of modern-day Croatia.

In addition, Nacional published the list of people ordered by votes received, although two of these were listed twice in duplicate entries, which was likely due to tabulation error:

- Painter Vlaho Bukovac was listed at no. 64 (with 13 votes) and no. 80 (with 7 votes). If these had been added up, he would have moved up to share no. 52 spot, with filmmaker Dušan Vukotić and pop singer Severina.
- Nobel Prize-winning chemist Vladimir Prelog was listed at no. 57 (with 17 votes) and no. 96 (with 2 votes). If these had been added up, he would have moved up to share no. 54 spot, with politician Ivica Račan and folk rock singer Marko Perković Thompson.

Without the two duplicates, the list would have had 96 entries, but since two of these involve pairs of notable people (17th-century noblemen Petar Zrinski and Fran Krsto Frankopan at no. 37, and 19th-century explorer brothers Mirko and Stjepan Seljan at no. 88) the list ends up having 98 individuals.

They are as follows:

1. Nikola Tesla (1856–1943), electrical engineer and inventor
2. Ruđer Bošković (1711–1787), physicist, astronomer, mathematician and philosopher
3. Miroslav Krleža (1893–1981), writer, playwright and poet
4. Franjo Tuđman (1922–1999), statesman, President of Croatia 1990–99
5. Dražen Petrović (1964–1993), basketball player, Olympic silver medalist
6. Stjepan Mesić (b. 1934), President of Croatia 2000–10
7. Ivo Andrić (1892–1975), novelist, Nobel Prize in Literature laureate
8. Tin Ujević (1891–1955), poet
9. Stevo Karapandža (b. 1947), celebrity chef
10. Tomislav of Croatia (?–928), 10th-century ruler of Croatia
11. Rahim Ademi (b. 1954), Croatian Army general
12. Stipe Šuvar (1936–2004), sociologist and politician
13. Vlado Gotovac (1930–2000), poet and politician
14. Ivan Meštrović (1883–1962), sculptor and architect
15. Josip Juraj Strossmayer (1815–1905), Roman Catholic bishop, benefactor and politician
16. Janica Kostelić (b. 1982), alpine ski racer, Olympic gold medalist
17. Stjepan Radić (1871–1928), early 20th century politician
18. Josip Jelačić (1801–1859), 19th-century Ban (viceroy) of Croatia
19. Ante Starčević (1823–1896), 19th-century politician
20. Alojzije Stepinac (1898–1960), Roman Catholic cardinal, Archbishop of Zagreb 1937–1960
21. Branimir Štulić (b. 1953), singer, songwriter and poet
22. Rade Šerbedžija (b. 1946), stage and film actor
23. Matija Gubec (c. 1556–1573), 16th-century leader of a peasant revolt
24. Mirko Ilić (b. 1956), graphic designer and comics artist
25. Miroslav Radman (b. 1944), biologist
26. Ivan Supek (1915–2007), physicist, philosopher, and writer
27. Franjo Kuharić (1919–2002), Roman Catholic cardinal, Archbishop of Zagreb 1970–1997
28. Branko Bauer (1921–2002), film director
29. Ante Gotovina (b. 1955), Croatian army lieutenant-general
30. Miljenko Smoje (1923–1995), writer and journalist
31. Goran Ivanišević (b. 1971), tennis player, winner of Wimbledon
32. Marija Jurić Zagorka (1873–1957), journalist and novelist
33. Ivana Brlić-Mažuranić (1874–1938), children's writer
34. Ljudevit Gaj (1809–1872), 19th-century linguist, politician and writer
35. Marko Marulić (1450–1524), 15th-century poet
36. Petar Zrinski (1621–1671) & Fran Krsto Frankopan (1643–1671), 17th-century noblemen, leaders of the Magnate conspiracy
37. Mile Dedaković (b. 1951), soldier, one of the Croatian commanders in the 1991 Battle of Vukovar
38. Lavoslav Ružička (1887–1976), scientist, Nobel Prize in Chemistry laureate
39. Juraj Dalmatinac (1410–1473), medieval sculptor and architect
40. Krešimir Ćosić (1948–1995), basketball player, Olympic medalist and Basketball Hall of Fame inductee
41. Slavoljub Penkala (1871–1922), engineer and inventor, created the mechanical pencil
42. Vladimir Nazor (1876–1949), author and politician
43. Ivan Gundulić (1589–1638), baroque Ragusan poet
44. Arsen Dedić (1938–2015), singer-songwriter, composer and poet
45. Marin Držić (1508–1567), renaissance Ragusan playwright
46. Tarik Filipović (b. 1972), actor and television personality
47. Goran Bregović (b. 1950), musician and composer
48. Mate Ujević (1901–1967), poet and lexicographer
49. Savka Dabčević-Kučar (1923–2009), politician, one of the leaders of the Croatian Spring movement
50. Miroslav Blažević (1935–2023), association football coach, led Croatia to third place in the 1998 FIFA World Cup
51. Dušan Vukotić (1927–1998), cartoonist, winner of the Academy Award for Best Animated Short Film
52. Severina Vučković (b. 1972), pop singer and actress
53. Ivica Račan (1944–2007), politician and prime minister of Croatia 2000–2003
54. Marko Perković Thompson (b. 1966), pop singer
55. Ivan Goran Kovačić (1913–1943), poet and writer, killed in World War II
56. Vladimir Prelog (1906–1998), scientist, Nobel Prize in Chemistry laureate
57. Branko Lustig (1932–2019), film producer, two-time Academy Awards winner
58. Dražen Budiša (b. 1948), politician, one of the leaders of the Croatian Spring movement
59. Mate Parlov (1948–2008), boxer, Olympic gold medalist
60. Vatroslav Lisinski (1819–1854), 19th-century composer
61. Faust Vrančić (1551–1617), polymath and inventor, best known for his 16th-century parachute design
62. Boris Dvornik (1939–2008), actor
63. Vlaho Bukovac (1855–1922), painter
64. Andrija Štampar (1888–1958), promoter of social medicine
65. Bernard Vukas (1927–1983), footballer, best known for his two spells at HNK Hajduk Split
66. Zinka Kunc (1906–1989), opera soprano, performed at New York's Metropolitan Opera and Milan's La Scala opera houses
67. Antun Mihanović (1796–1861), poet, best known for penning the lyrics to the Croatian anthem
68. Fabijan Šovagović (1932–2001), actor
69. Slavenka Drakulić (b. 1949), writer and journalist
70. August Šenoa (1838–1881), 19th-century novelist
71. Andrija Maurović (1901–1981), comic book artist, known as the "father of Croatian comics"
72. Antun Augustinčić (1900–1979), sculptor
73. Ante Topić Mimara (1898–1987), art collector, founder of the Mimara Museum
74. Edo Murtić (1921–2005), painter
75. Ivo Pogorelić (b. 1958), pianist
76. Bruno Bušić (1939–1978), promoter of Croatia's independence, assassinated in exile in 1978
77. Frano Supilo (1870–1917), politician and journalist, founder of Novi list daily
78. Goran Višnjić (b. 1972), actor, best known for starring in the American TV series ER
79. Vlaho Bukovac (duplicate entry, see #64)
80. Andrija Hebrang (1899–1949), politician
81. Dragutin Gorjanović-Kramberger (1856–1936), paleontologist, discovered the Neanderthal site near Krapina
82. Juraj Križanić (1618–1683), 17th-century Catholic missionary
83. Marin Getaldić (1568–1626), Ragusan scientist, best known for his work in optics
84. Antun Gustav Matoš (1873–1914), poet and essayist
85. Franjo Šeper (1905–1981), Roman Catholic cardinal, Archbishop of Zagreb 1960–1970
86. Oliver Mlakar (b. 1935), television presenter
87. Mirko Seljan (1871–1913) & Stjepan Seljan (1875–1936), explorers best known for their travels in South America and Africa
88. Ivan Lupis (1813–1875), officer of the Austrian Navy, credited as the inventor of the torpedo
89. Ante Trumbić (1864–1938), politician
90. Franjo Trenk (1711–1749), Austrian officer, known as "father of the military band"
91. Ivo Robić (1923–2000), singer and songwriter
92. Ivan Generalić (1914–1992), naïve art painter
93. Lovro pl. Matačić (1899–1985), conductor
94. Slava Raškaj (1877–1906), 19th-century deaf woman painter
95. Vladimir Prelog (duplicate entry, see #56)
96. Branko Gavella (1885–1962), theatre director and essayist
97. Krešo Golik (1922–1996), film director and screenwriter
98. Bartol Kašić (1575–1650), linguist, wrote the first Croatian grammar and translated the Bible into Croatian
99. Marko Turina (b. 1937), cardiac surgeon, first surgeon to operate a congenital heart defect on a newborn

== See also ==
- 100 Greatest Britons
  - Greatest Britons spin-offs
