= Suuret suomalaiset =

Finnish television series

Suuret suomalaiset (Great Finns) was a 2004 television show, broadcast in Finland by Yle, which determined the 100 greatest Finns of all time according to the opinions of its viewers. The viewers were able to vote during a programme which lasted from October to December 2004. The show was a Finnish spin-off of the BBC's programme Great Britons.

== The list ==
=== The winner ===
During the final stage of voting, people had the chance to vote for the following three leading candidates: Risto Ryti, C.G.E. Mannerheim and Urho Kekkonen. The winner was baron Carl Gustaf Emil Mannerheim, a war hero, Marshal of Finland, and president.

=== Top Ten ===
1. C.G.E. Mannerheim (1867–1951) (President of Finland, 1944–1946, and Marshal of Finland)
2. Risto Ryti (1889–1956) (President of Finland, 1940–1944)
3. Urho Kekkonen (1900–1986) (President of Finland, 1956–1982)
4. Adolf Ehrnrooth (1905–2004) (General of the Infantry, a figurehead for the Finnish veteran community)
5. Tarja Halonen (1943–) (first female President of Finland, 2000–2012)
6. Arvo Ylppö (1887–1992) (famed pediatrician)
7. Mikael Agricola (1510–1557) (Protestant reformer and creator of literary Finnish language)
8. Jean Sibelius (1865–1957) (world-famous composer of romantic music)
9. Aleksis Kivi (1834–1872) (national author)
10. Elias Lönnrot (1802–1884) (anthropologist)

== Similar shows ==
Other countries have produced similar shows; see Greatest Britons spin-offs.
