= El Gen Argentino =

- Title screen
- Also known as: The Argentine Gene
- Genre: Cultural programming
- Directed by: Fernando Emiliozzi
- Creative director: Cune Molinero
- Presented by: Mario Pergolini
- Starring: Felipe Pigna; Gonzalo Bonadeo; Jorge Halperin; María Seoane
- Country of origin: Argentina
- Original language: Spanish
- No. of seasons: 1

Production
- Producers: Diego Guebel; Mario Pergolini
- Production company: Cuatro Cabezas

Original release
- Network: Telefe
- Release: 27 August – 15 October 2007

Related
- Greatest Britons spin-offs

El Gen Argentino (Spanish for "The Argentine Gene") is an Argentine television programme aired on Telefe to determine who the public considered "the greatest Argentine in history". Premiered on 27 August 2007, it was a spin-off of the 2002 100 Greatest Britons series produced by the BBC. The Top 10 were announced on launch night, with almost 350,000 votes cast. In subsequent episodes, two candidates were chosen via an Internet vote for each of the five categories: sports, popular culture and journalism, 19th century politics, 20th century politics, and arts, sciences and humanities. On the last airing of the show, one personality among them was declared the winner.

== Complete list ==
Personality		Notability	Category	Rank	Ref.
	José de San Martín	General, national hero of Argentina, first President of Peru, and prime leader of the southern part of South America's successful struggle for independence from the Spanish Empire.	19th century politics	1	
	René Favaloro	Cardiac surgeon known for his pioneering work on coronary artery bypass surgery.	Arts, sciences and humanities	2	
	Juan Manuel Fangio	Racing car driver and winner of five Formula One World Drivers' Championships.	Sports	3	
	Alberto Olmedo	Comedian and actor.	Popular culture and journalism	4	
	Che Guevara	Revolutionary, guerrilla leader, and a major figure of the Cuban Revolution.	20th century politics	5	
	Diego Maradona	Association football icon considered by many experts and critics to be the greatest player of all time.	Sports	6–10	
	Eva Perón	First Lady of Argentina and founder of the Eva Perón Foundation.	20th century politics	6–10	
	Jorge Luis Borges	Writer, essayist, poet, and translator.	Arts, sciences and humanities	6–10	
	Manuel Belgrano	Military leader and creator of the flag of Argentina.	19th century politics	6–10	
	Roberto Fontanarrosa	Cartoonist and writer.	Popular culture and journalism	6–10	
	Adolfo Bioy Casares	Fiction writer, journalist, translator, and Miguel de Cervantes Prize recipient.	Arts, sciences and humanities	11–100	
	Adolfo Pérez Esquivel	Human rights activist and Nobel Peace Prize laureate.	20th century politics	11–100	
	Alfonsina Storni	Poet.	Arts, sciences and humanities	11–100	
	Alfredo Alcón	Theatre and film actor.	Popular culture and journalism	11–100	
	Alfredo Di Stéfano	Association football icon widely regarded as one of the greatest players of all time.	Sports	11–100	
	Alfredo Palacios	Politician and author of a number of laws relating to child and female labour, working hours, and Sunday rest.	20th century politics	11–100	
	Alicia Moreau de Justo	Physician, politician, pacifist, and human rights activist.	20th century politics	11–100	
	Ángel Vicente Peñaloza	Military officer and ruler of La Rioja Province.	19th century politics	11–100	
	Antonio Berni	Figurative artist.	Arts, sciences and humanities	11–100	
	Arturo Frondizi	President of Argentina.	20th century politics	11–100	
	Arturo Umberto Illia	President of Argentina.	20th century politics	11–100	
	Ástor Piazzolla	Argentine tango composer and bandoneón virtuoso.	Popular culture and journalism	11–100	
	Atahualpa Yupanqui	Folk musician.	Popular culture and journalism	11–100	
	Bartolomé Mitre	President of Argentina.	19th century politics	11–100	
	Benito Quinquela Martín	Painter.	Arts, sciences and humanities	11–100	
	Bernardino Rivadavia	President of Argentina.	19th century politics	11–100	
	Bernardo Houssay	Physiologist and the first Latin American Nobel Prize in Physiology or Medicine laureate.	Arts, sciences and humanities	11–100	
—	Calfucurá	Mapuche lonko.	19th century politics	11–100	
	Carlos Bilardo	Coach of the Argentine national side that won the 1986 FIFA World Cup.	Sports	11–100	
	Carlos Gardel	Singer, songwriter, composer, actor, and perhaps the most prominent figure in the history of the tango.	Popular culture and journalism	11–100	
	Carlos Menem	President of Argentina.	20th century politics	11–100	
	Carlos Monzón	Professional boxer who held the undisputed world middleweight championship for 7 years.	Sports	11–100	
	Carlos Mugica	Roman Catholic priest, human rights activist, and member of the Movement of Priests for the Third World.	20th century politics	11–100	
	Carlos Reutemann	Formula One racing car driver.	Sports	11–100	
—	Charly García	Singer, songwriter, pianist, keyboardist, guitarist, and bassist.	Popular culture and journalism	11–100	
—	César Luis Menotti	Coach of the Argentine national side that won the 1978 FIFA World Cup.	Sports	11–100	
	César Milstein	Biochemist and Nobel Prize in Physiology or Medicine laureate.	Arts, sciences and humanities	11–100	
—	Daniel Passarella	Captain of the Argentine national side that won the 1978 FIFA World Cup.	Sports	11–100	
	Domingo Faustino Sarmiento	President of Argentina.	19th century politics	11–100	
	Enrique Angelelli	Roman Catholic bishop and human rights activist.	20th century politics	11–100	
	Enrique Santos Discépolo	Argentine tango and milonga musician and composer.	Popular culture and journalism	11–100	
	Ernesto Sabato	Writer and Miguel de Cervantes Prize recipient.	Arts, sciences and humanities	11–100	
	Esteban Echeverría	Poet and fiction writer.	Arts, sciences and humanities	11–100	
	Estela Barnes de Carlotto	Human rights activist and leader of the Grandmothers of the Plaza de Mayo.	20th century politics	11–100	
	Facundo Quiroga	Caudillo and subject of the book Facundo, Domingo Faustino Sarmiento's most prominent work.	19th century politics	11–100	
	Florentino Ameghino	Naturalist, paleontologist, anthropologist, and zoologist.	Arts, sciences and humanities	11–100	
	Francisco Moreno	Academic and explorer.	19th century politics	11–100	
	Gabriel Batistuta	Association football player and Argentina's all-time leading goalscorer.	Sports	11–100	
	Gabriela Sabatini	Tennis player, US Open singles champion, and Wimbledon doubles champion.	Sports	11–100	
	Guillermo Vilas	Tennis player and winner of four Grand Slam titles in singles.	Sports	11–100	
	Gustavo Santaolalla	Musician, film composer, and winner of two Academy Awards for Best Original Score.	Popular culture and journalism	11–100	
	Hebe de Bonafini	Human rights activist and one of the founders of the Mothers of the Plaza de Mayo.	20th century politics	11–100	
	Hipólito Yrigoyen	President of Argentina.	20th century politics	11–100	
	Hugo Porta	Rugby union player and inductee of both the International Rugby Hall of Fame and IRB Hall of Fame.	Sports	11–100	
	Jorge Newbery	Aviator, civil servant, engineer, scientist, and one of the first Latin American aircraft pilots.	Sports	11–100	
	José Hernández	Journalist, politician, poet, and creator of Argentina's national epic, the Martín Fierro.	Arts, sciences and humanities	11–100	
	José María Gatica	Professional boxer.	Sports	11–100	
	Juan Bautista Alberdi	Political theorist and diplomat.	19th century politics	11–100	
	Juan José Castelli	Lawyer and one of the leaders of the May Revolution.	19th century politics	11–100	
	Juan Manuel de Rosas	Caudillo and Governor of Buenos Aires Province.	19th century politics	11–100	
	Juan Domingo Perón	President of Argentina.	20th century politics	11–100	
	Juana Azurduy de Padilla	Military leader.	19th century politics	11–100	
	Julio Argentino Roca	President of Argentina.	19th century politics	11–100	
	Julio Bocca	One of the most important ballet dancers of the later part of the 20th century.	Arts, sciences and humanities	11–100	
	Julio Cortázar	Novelist, short story writer, and essayist.	Arts, sciences and humanities	11–100	
	Justo José de Urquiza	President of Argentina.	19th century politics	11–100	
	Leandro Nicéforo Alem	Politician.	19th century politics	11–100	
	León Gieco	Argentine rock composer and interpreter.	Popular culture and journalism	11–100	
	Lisandro de la Torre	Politician and senator.	20th century politics	11–100	
	Lola Mora	Sculptor.	Arts, sciences and humanities	11–100	
	Luciana Aymar	Field hockey player, two-time world champion, and winner of the FIH Player of the Year Award a record eight times.	Sports	11–100	
	Luis Federico Leloir	Biochemist, physician, and the first Spanish-speaking Nobel Prize in Chemistry laureate.	Arts, sciences and humanities	11–100	
	Luis Sandrini	Film actor and producer.	Popular culture and journalism	11–100	
	Manu Ginóbili	Basketball player, Olympic gold medalist, and four-time NBA champion.	Sports	11–100	
	Manuel Dorrego	Military officer and Governor of Buenos Aires Province.	19th century politics	11–100	
	Mariano Moreno	Lawyer, journalist, politician, and member of the First Assembly.	19th century politics	11–100	
—	Mariano Mores	Argentine tango composer, pianist and conductor.	Popular culture and journalism	11–100	
	Mario Kempes	Association football player and winner of the 1978 FIFA World Cup.	Sports	11–100	
	Mariquita Sánchez de Thompson	Patriot.	19th century politics	11–100	
	Martín Miguel de Güemes	Military leader known for his defence of northwestern Argentina during the War of Independence.	19th century politics	11–100	
	María Elena Walsh	Poet, novelist, musician, dramaturge, writer, and composer.	Popular culture and journalism	11–100	
	Mercedes Sosa	Folk musician.	Popular culture and journalism	11–100	
	Nicolino Locche	Boxer.	Sports	11–100	
	Niní Marshall	Humorist, comic actress, and screenwriter.	Popular culture and journalism	11–100	
	Norma Aleandro	Actress, screenwriter, and theatre director.	Popular culture and journalism	11–100	
	Néstor Kirchner	President of Argentina.	20th century politics	11–100	
	Oscar Bonavena	Boxer.	Sports	11–100	
	Quino	Cartoonist.	Popular culture and journalism	11–100	
	Ramón Carrillo	Neurosurgeon, neurobiologist, and public health physician.	Arts, sciences and humanities	11–100	
	Raúl Alfonsín	President of Argentina.	20th century politics	11–100	
	Ricardo Balbín	Lawyer and politician.	20th century politics	11–100	
	Roberto Arlt	Novelist, playwright, journalist, and inventor.	Arts, sciences and humanities	11–100	
	Roberto De Vicenzo	Professional golfer, The Open Championship winner, and champion of more than 230 tournaments worldwide.	Sports	11–100	
—	Rodolfo Walsh	Writer considered the founder of Argentine investigative journalism.	20th century politics	11–100	
	Roque Sáenz Peña	President of Argentina.	20th century politics	11–100	
	Salvador Mazza	Physician and epidemiologist known for his strides in helping control American trypanosomiasis.	Arts, sciences and humanities	11–100	
	Sandro de América	Singer, actor, and the first Latin American artist to sing at Madison Square Garden.	Popular culture and journalism	11–100	
	Tato Bores	Film, theatre, and television comedian.	Popular culture and journalism	11–100	
	Tita Merello	Film actress, tango dancer, and singer.	Popular culture and journalism	11–100	
	Xul Solar	Painter, sculptor, writer, and inventor of imaginary languages.	Arts, sciences and humanities	11–100	

== Facts ==
- Nominees by area:
  - Political figures: 25.
  - Sports: 19.
  - Presidents: 13.
  - Music: 10.
  - Literature: 8.
  - Science: 7.
  - Television, cinema and radio: 7.
  - Painters and sculptors: 5.
  - Military figures: 4.
  - Religion: 2.
  - First Ladies: 1.
  - Aviators: 1.
  - Business and industry: 0.
