= Il più grande italiano di tutti i tempi =

Italian television show

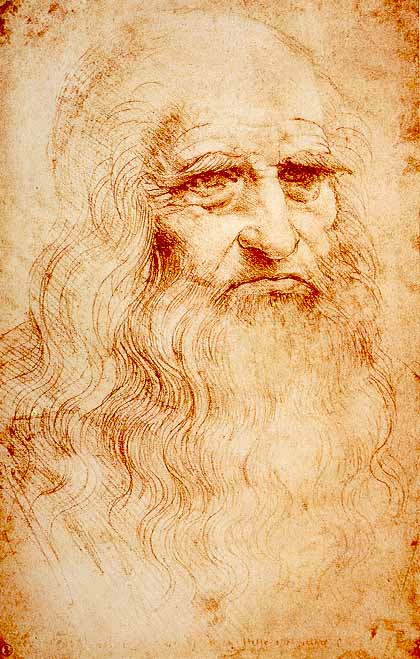
Leonardo da Vinci, The Greatest Italian Ever

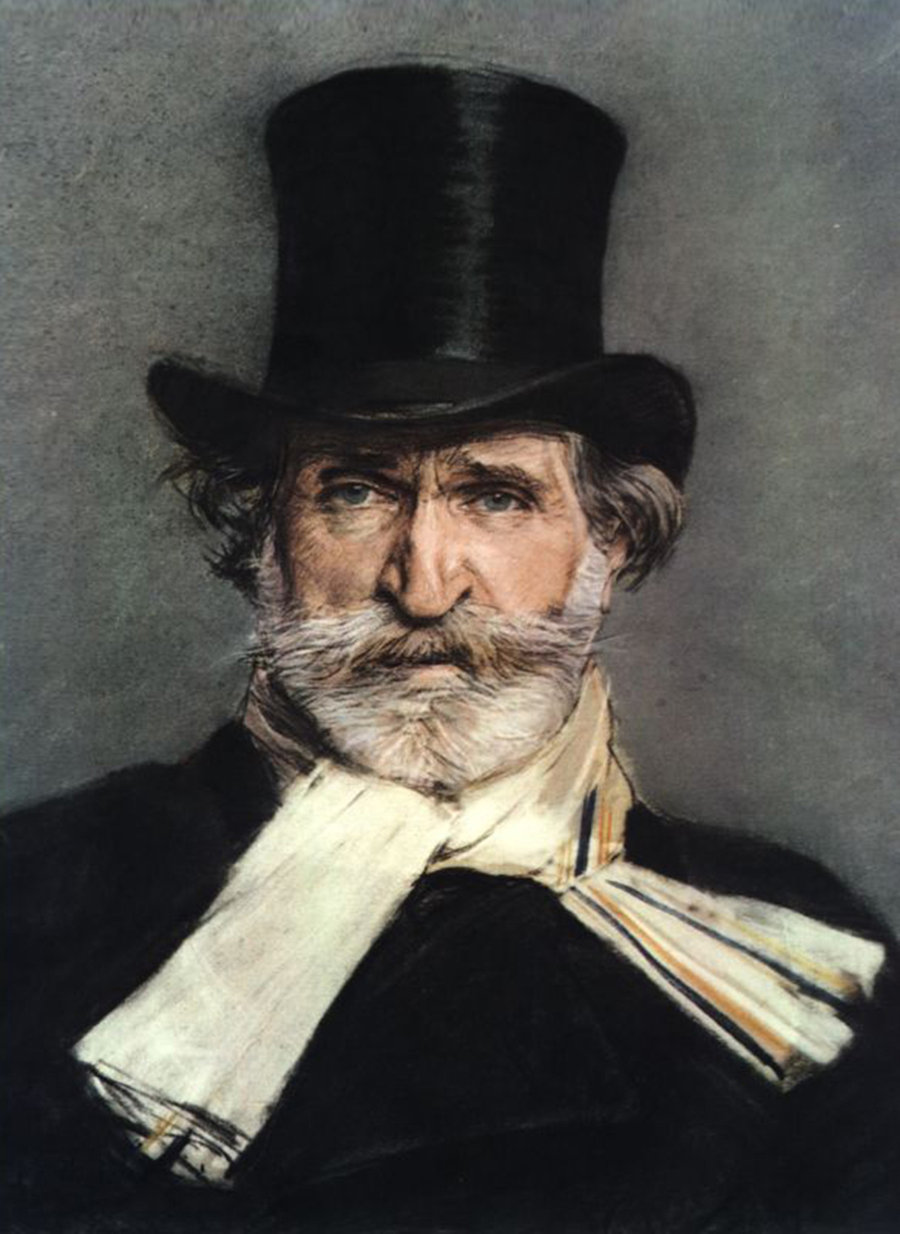
Giuseppe Verdi, runner-up

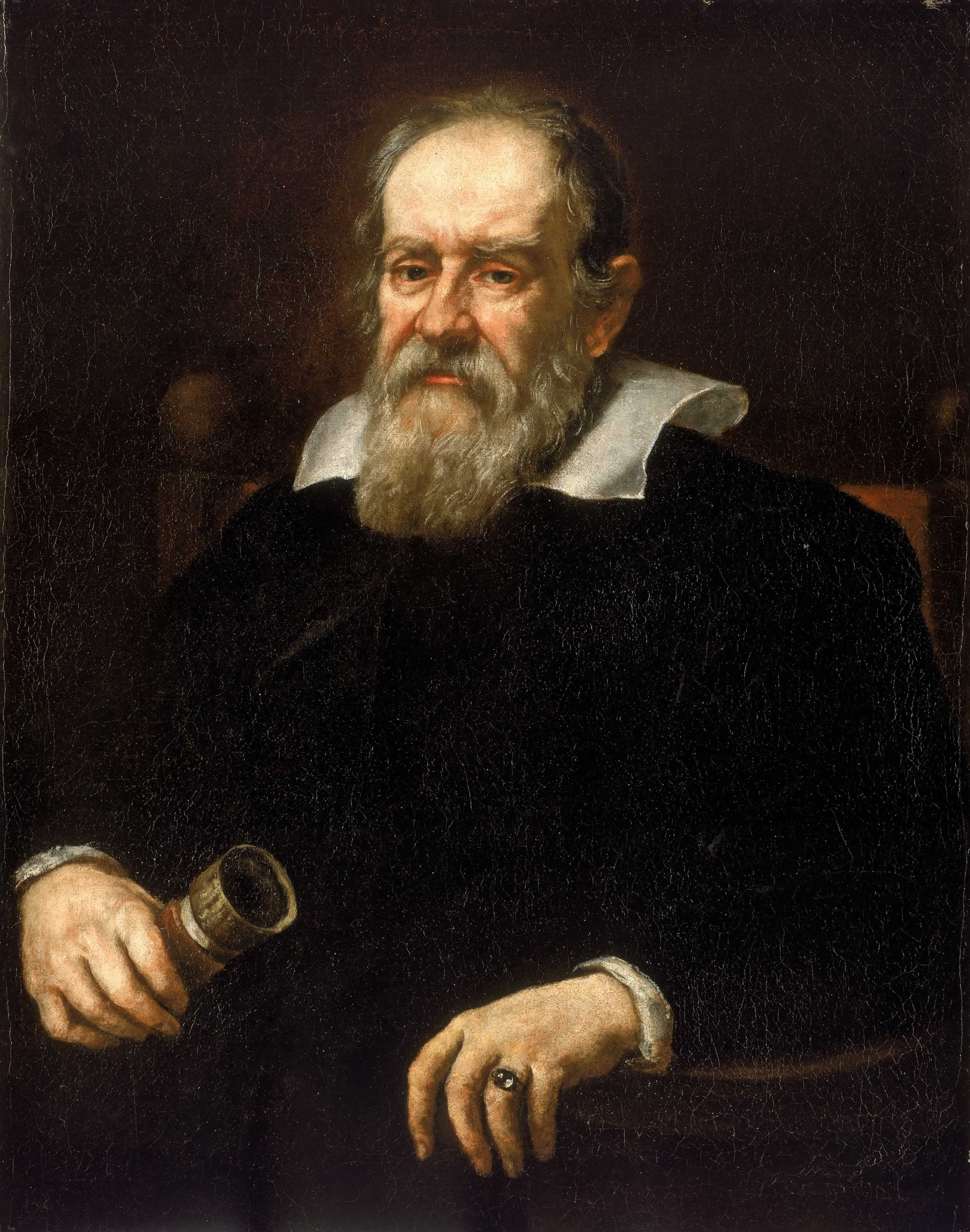
Galileo Galilei, semifinalist

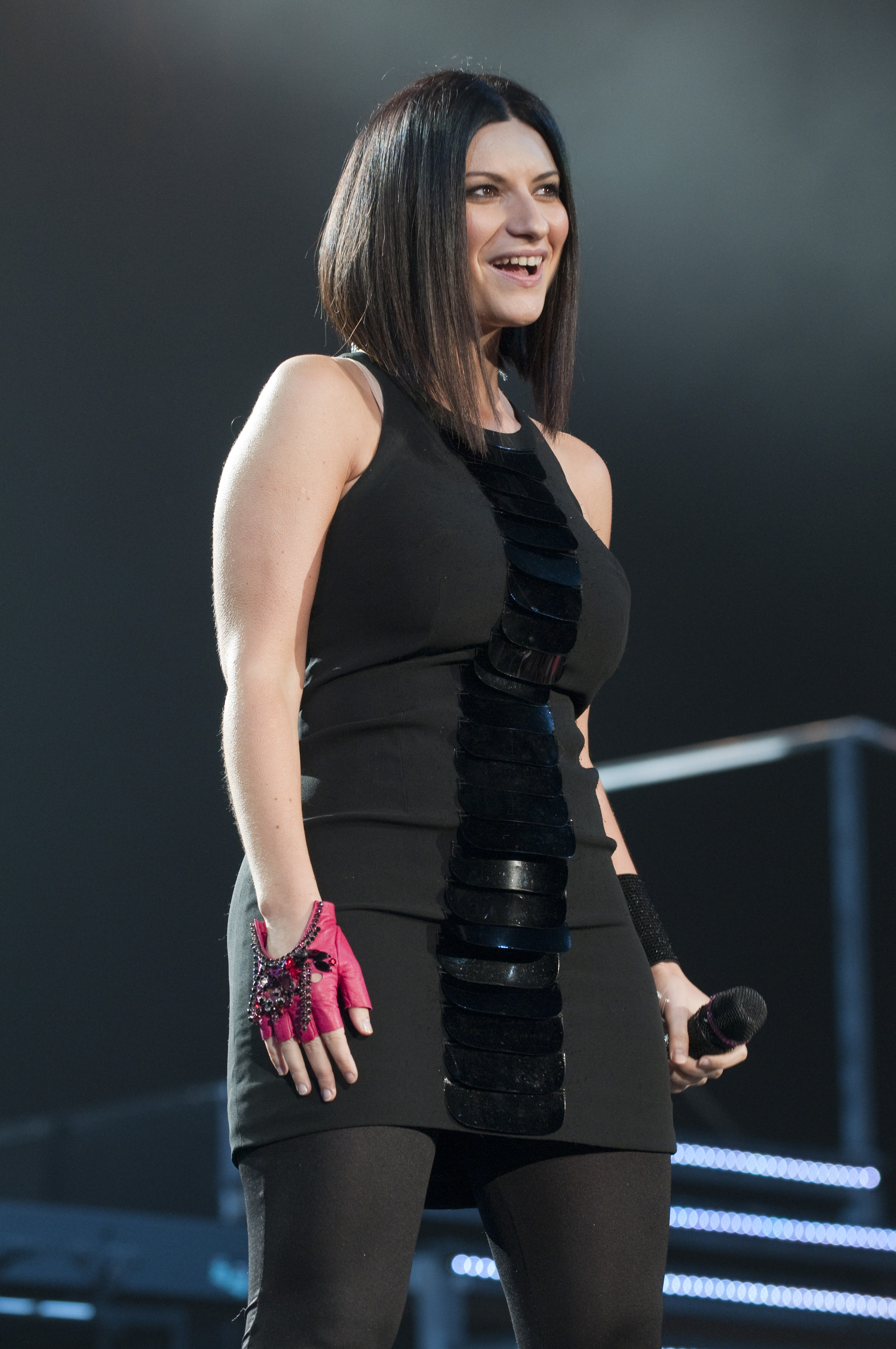
Laura Pausini, 6th place

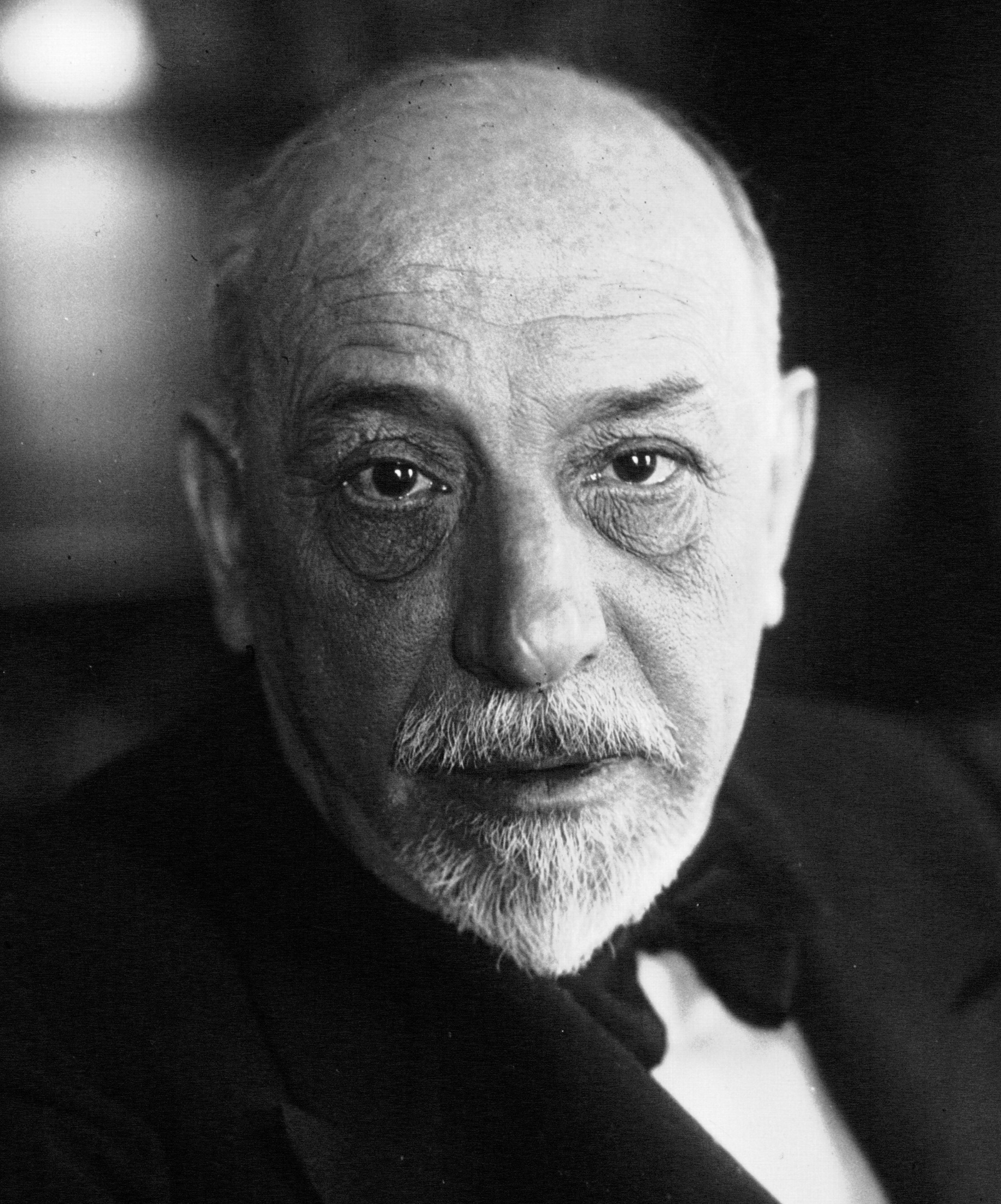
Luigi Pirandello, 8th place

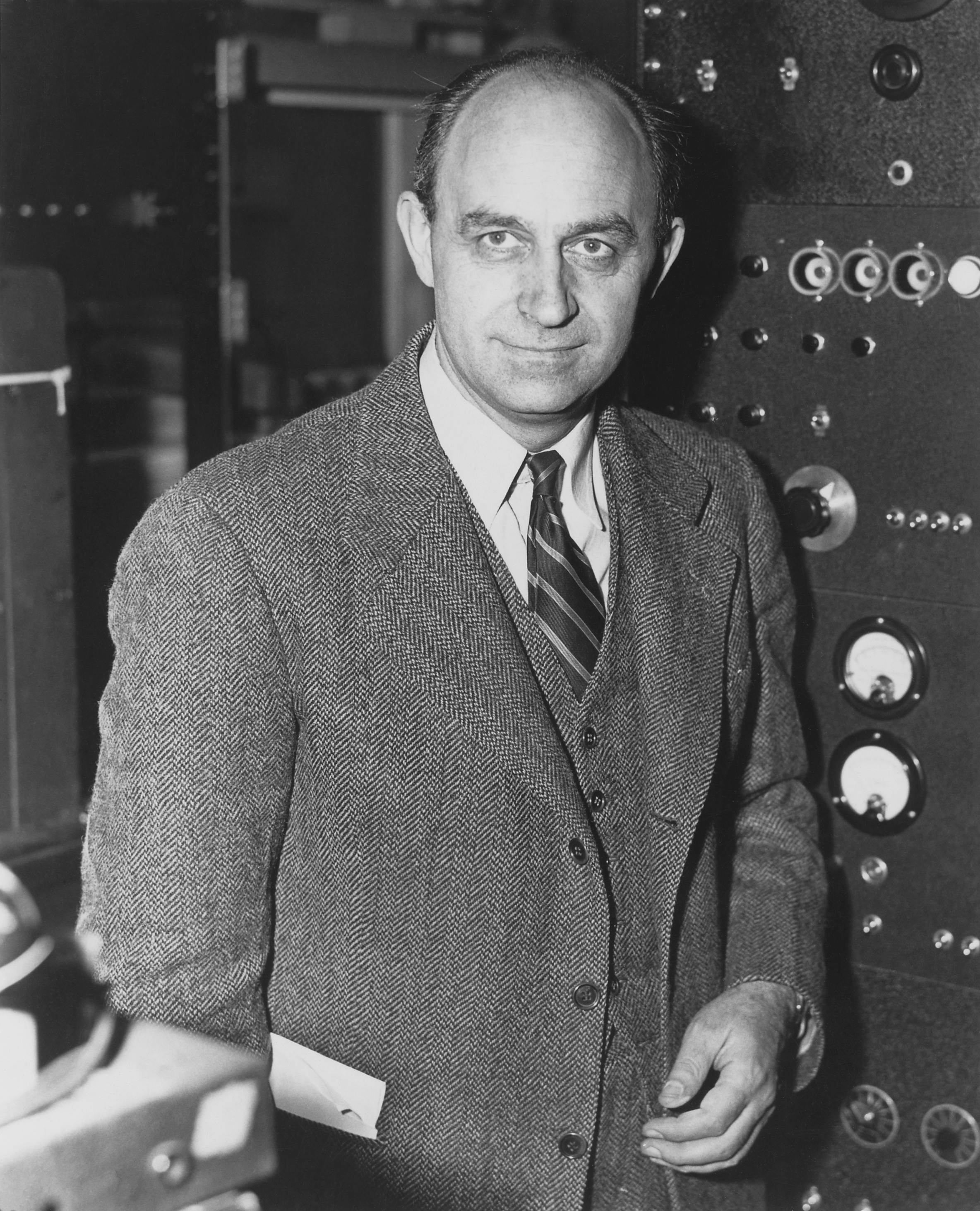
Enrico Fermi, 9th place

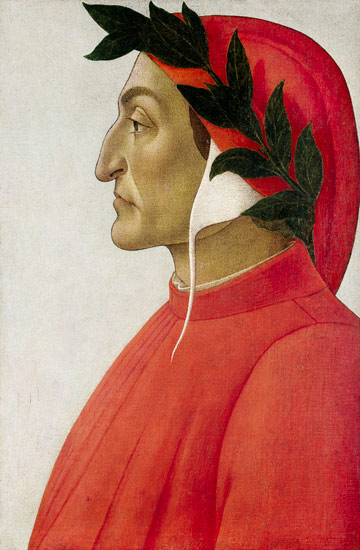
Dante Alighieri, 10th place

Il più grande italiano di tutti i tempi ("The greatest Italian of all times") is an Italian television show, based on the British 100 Greatest Britons. It was transmitted on Rai 2 in January and February 2010.

The programme was presented by Francesco Facchinetti and Martina Stella in four sessions. The winner was Leonardo da Vinci.

The show was widely criticized and ignored by some historians in that it focussed mainly on personalities of recent history and today's Italian world. Some key figures of Italian history were largely ignored, including every figure from Ancient Rome, Popes and other Roman Catholic clergy who had a decisive role in shaping the history of Italy. Also, the show had a very low share rate, 6%, due to the "unacceptable choice of representatives of the Italian culture such as Laura Pausini, definitely less important than genii such as Michelangelo and Donatello.

== The jury ==
- Italians members: Vittorio Sgarbi, Mara Venier, and Giulia Innocenzi (sessions 1, 2, 3, 4); Monica Setta (sessions 2, 3, 4); Maurizio Costanzo (session 2), Giampiero Mughini (sessions 3, 4); Pietrangelo Buttafuoco and Tinto Brass (session 1).
- Foreign press members: A. Englisch (Germany), P. Thomas (U.S.A.), J. Grego (Great Britain), E. Jozsef (France), and C. Pelayo (Spain).

== The finalists ==
- Leonardo da Vinci (1452–1519) winner
- Giuseppe Verdi (1813–1901) runner-up
- Giovanni Falcone (1939–1992) and Paolo Borsellino (1940–1992) semifinalists
- Galileo Galilei (1564–1642) semifinalist
- Totò (1898–1967) 5th place
- Laura Pausini (1974– ) 6th place
- Anna Magnani (1908–1973) 7th place ex-aequo
- Luigi Pirandello (1867–1936) 8th place ex-aequo
- Enrico Fermi (1901–1954) 9th place ex-aequo
- Dante Alighieri (c. 1265–1321) 10th place for choice of the jury

Out of the top ten before the start of the final by web ranking.

- Caravaggio (1571–1610)
- Christopher Columbus (1451–1506)
- Giacomo Puccini (1858–1924)

== The list ==
- Lucio Battisti (1943–1998) musician
- Roberto Benigni (1952– ) actor and director, known for "La vita è bella"
- Mike Bongiorno (1924–2009) American-born television host who was later naturalized Italian
- Caravaggio (1571–1610) painter
- Giosuè Carducci (1835–1907) poet
- Cristoforo Colombo (1451–1506) explorer
- Fausto Coppi (1919–1960) cyclist
- Dante (c. 1265–1321) poet known for "Divine Comedy"
- Leonardo da Vinci (1452–1519) Renaissance polymath
- Eduardo De Filippo (1900–1984) actor
- Vittorio De Sica (1901–1974) director and actor
- Falcone (1939–1992) judge and Borsellino (1940–1992) prosecuting magistrate
- Federico Fellini (1920–1993) director and screenwriter
- Enrico Fermi (1901–1954) physicist settled in the United States after World War II, creator of the world's first nuclear reactor, the Chicago Pile-1.
- Chiara Ferragni (1987-) blogger, businesswoman, fashion designer and model
- Enzo Ferrari (1898–1988) racing car driver and founder of Ferrari automobile manufacturer
- Rosario Fiorello (1960– ) radio and television presenter
- Galileo Galilei (1564–1642) the "father of modern physics"
- Giuseppe Garibaldi (1807–1882) general and politician
- Vittorio Gassman (1922–2000) film actor
- Giotto (1266–1337) painter and architect
- Giacomo Leopardi (1798–1837) poet, philosopher and philologist
- Rita Levi-Montalcini (1909–2012) neurobiologist
- Sophia Loren (1934– ) film actress and singer
- Anna Magnani (1908–1973) actress
- Nino Manfredi (1921–2004) actor
- Alessandro Manzoni (1785–1837) poet and novelist
- Guglielmo Marconi (1874–1937) inventor and electrical engineer
- Marcello Mastroianni (1924–1996) film actor
- Giuseppe Mazzini (1805–1872) activist for the unification of Italy and politician
- Michelangelo (1475–1564) sculptor, painter and architect
- Mina (1940– ) singer
- Aldo Moro (1916–1978) Prime Minister of Italy
- Giovanni Pascoli (1855–1912) poet
- Laura Pausini (1974– ) pop singer
- Luciano Pavarotti (1935–2007) operatic tenor
- Sandro Pertini (1896–1990) seventh President of Italian Republic
- Francesco Petrarca (1304–1374) scholar and poet
- Luigi Pirandello (1867–1936) dramatist and novelist
- Marco Polo (1254–1342) explorer
- Giacomo Puccini (1858–1924) opera composer
- Valentino Rossi (1979– ) motorcycle road racer
- Alberto Sordi (1920–2003) actor
- Totò (1898–1967) actor and comedian
- Massimo Troisi (1953–1994) actor and film director
- Giuseppe Verdi (1813–1901) opera composer
- Alessandro Volta (1745–1827) inventor of electrical battery

== See also ==
- 100 Greatest Britons
- Greatest Britons spin-offs
