= The Greatest Indian =

2012 public opinion poll

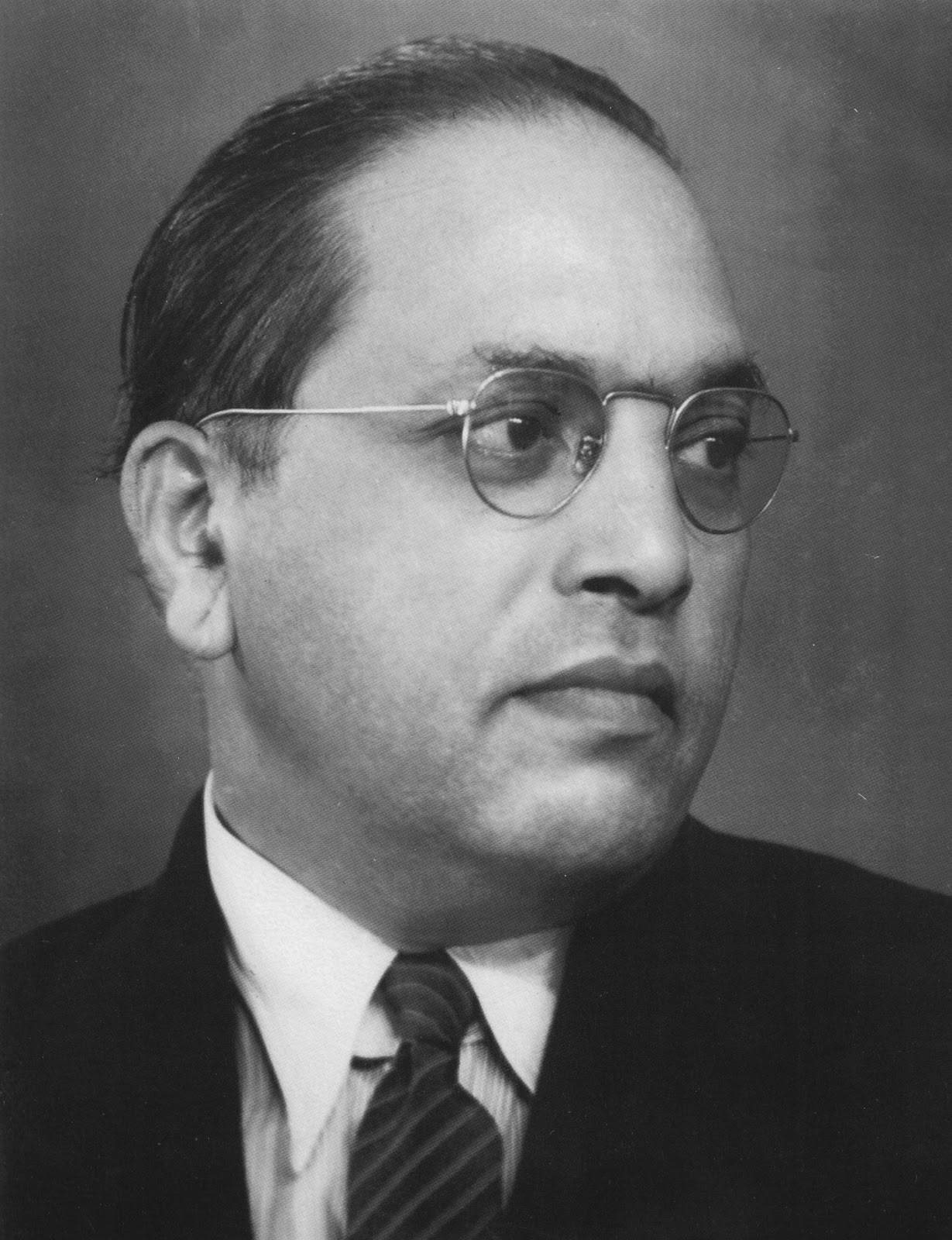
B. R. Ambedkar was voted the "Greatest Indian".

The Greatest Indian is a poll, sponsored by Reliance Mobile, and conducted by Outlook magazine, in partnership with CNN-IBN and The History Channel. The poll was conducted from June to August 2012, with the winner, B. R. Ambedkar, being announced on 11 August. A program associated with the poll aired from 4 June until 15 August.

Unlike other editions of Greatest Britons spin-offs, The Greatest Indian did not include people from all time periods of history. Two reasons were given for this choice. The first was that "the pre-independence history of India is dominated by Mahatma Gandhi and it is impossible for anyone to come close to the Father of the Nation when it comes to Leadership, Impact and Contribution. [...] The panel of experts felt that if Gandhi were to be included in the list, there would be no competition for title of The Greatest Indian". Secondly, The Greatest Indian chose to focus on India as a modern nation: "India today is unrecognizable from the India that got independence in 1947. This nation has achieved this stature in the world thanks to contribution from millions of Indians. This is an effort to recognise one who has made the maximum contribution and impact in the surge of independent India".

== Nominations and voting process ==
A list of one hundred names was presented to, and compiled, by a twenty-eight-member jury, composed of actors, writers, sportspersons, entrepreneurs, and men and women of distinction in their fields. This jury included N. Ram (former Editor-In-Chief of The Hindu), Vinod Mehta (Editor-in-Chief of Outlook), Soli Sorabjee (Former Attorney General of India), Sharmila Tagore (Bollywood actress and former Chairperson of the Censor Board of India), Harsha Bhogle (sports), Chetan Bhagat (author), Ramachandra Guha (historian), Shashi Tharoor (politician and author), Nandan Nilekani, Rajkumar Hirani, Shabana Azmi and Arun Jaitley. They finalized a list of the top 50 nominees, which was released to the public on 4 June 2012, by CNN-IBN Editor-in-Chief Rajdeep Sardesai. A three-way process was then used to assess a top ten, in which equal weight was given to the votes of the jury, an online poll, and a market survey conducted by the Nielsen Company. 7,129,050 people participated in this phase of the online poll. Public voting was conducted from 4 to 25 June, with the final top ten were announced on 3 July. A second round of voting followed, using the same method as the first, lasting from 1 July to 1 August. Individuals were able to cast votes either by visiting www.thegreatestindian.in or by calling a unique number given to each of the nominees. Nearly 20,000,000 people voted in this round of the survey. The announcement of the winner was made on 11 August, with a special finale, hosted by Amitabh Bachchan and featuring other Indian celebrities, airing on 14 and 15 August (Independence Day).

== Top 10 ==
The top 10 nominees have all received the Bharat Ratna, the highest civilian award of the Republic of India.

List of the top ten "greatest Indians".
Rank	Image	Name	State	Notability
1		B. R. Ambedkar (1891–1956)	Maharashtra	The father of the Constitution of India, scholar, social reformer and leader of the Dalits, Ambedkar was the first Law Minister of India. He was given the honorific title "Babasaheb" ("respected father"). Ambedkar predominantly campaigned against social discrimination against Dalits, Women, Adivasi and Other Backward Castes in the Hindu caste system. He was associated with the Dalit Buddhist movement and accepted Buddhism as a religion along with his more than half a million followers on 14 October 1956. Ambedkar revived Buddhism in India.
2		A. P. J. Abdul Kalam (1931–2015)	Tamil Nadu	Aerospace and defence scientist, Kalam was involved in the development of India's first satellite launch vehicle SLV III and was the architect of Integrated Guided Missile Development Program. He worked for Indian National Committee for Space Research, Indian Space Research Organisation, Defence Research and Development Laboratory and was appointed as the scientific advisor to the defence minister, secretary to Department of Defence Research and Development and director general of Defence Research and Development Organisation. Later, he served as the eleventh president of India from 2002 until 2007.
3		Vallabhbhai Patel (1875–1950)	Gujarat	Widely known as the "Iron Man of India", Patel was an independence activist and first Deputy Prime Minister of India (1947–50). Post independence, "Sardar" ("Leader") Patel worked with V. P. Menon towards dissolving 555 princely states into the Indian union. He is also remembered as the "patron saint of India's civil servants" for having established the modern All India Services system. 1947: Patel was featured on the cover of Time magazine.
4		Jawaharlal Nehru (1889–1964)	Uttar Pradesh	Independence activist and author, Pandit Nehru is the first and the longest-serving prime minister of India (1947–64). Nehru himself was Prime Minister of India at the time of receiving Bharat Ratna award. Nehru is popularly called 'Chacha Nehru'. Nehru's birthday is celebrated as Children's Day
5		Mother Teresa (1910–1997)	West Bengal (Born in Skopje, Ottoman Empire, now North Macedonia)	"Saint Mother Teresa of Calcutta" was a Catholic nun and the founder of the Missionaries of Charity, a Roman Catholic religious congregation, which manages homes for people who are dying of HIV/AIDS, leprosy and tuberculosis. She was awarded the Nobel Peace Prize for her humanitarian work in 1979 and was beatified on 19 October 2003 by Pope John Paul II and canonised on 4 September 2016 by Pope Francis.
6		J. R. D. Tata (1904–1993)	Maharashtra	Industrialist, philanthropist, and aviation pioneer, Tata founded India's first airline, Air India. He is the founder of various institutes, including Tata Institute of Fundamental Research, Tata Memorial Hospital, Tata Institute of Social Sciences, Tata Motors, TCS, National Institute of Advanced Studies, and National Centre for the Performing Arts.
7		Indira Gandhi (1917–1984)	Uttar Pradesh	Known as the "Iron Lady of India", Gandhi was the Prime Minister of India during 1966–77 and 1980–84. During the Indo-Pakistani War of 1971, her government supported Bangladesh Liberation War which led to the formation of a new country, Bangladesh. She was the daughter of Jawaharlal Nehru.
8		Sachin Tendulkar (b. 1973)	Maharashtra	Having debuted in 1989, Tendulkar played 664 international cricket matches in a career spanning over two decades. He holds various cricket records including the only player to have scored one hundred international centuries, the first batsman to score a double century in a One Day International and the only player to complete more than 34,000 runs in both ODI and Test cricket.
9		Atal Bihari Vajpayee (1924–2018)	Madhya Pradesh	Parliamentarian for over four decades, Vajpayee was elected nine times to the Lok Sabha, twice to the Rajya Sabha and served as the Prime Minister of India for three terms; 1996, 1998, 1999–2004. He was also a renowned poet and writer. During his tenure as prime minister, India carried out the successful Pokhran-II nuclear tests in 1998. He was Minister of External Affairs during 1977–79 and was awarded the "Best Parliamentarian" in 1994.
10		Lata Mangeshkar (1929–2022)	Maharashtra	Widely credited as the "nightingale of India", playback singer Mangeshkar started her career in the 1940s and had sung songs in over 36 languages. In 1989, Mangeshkar was awarded the Dadasaheb Phalke Award, India's highest award in cinema.

== List of original fifty nominees ==
Of 50 nominees, 15 have received the Bharat Ratna and 6 are women. The oldest living nominees at the time of the poll were B. K. S. Iyengar (93) Ravi Shankar (92), Verghese Kurien (90), R. K. Laxman (90), Dilip Kumar (89), Atal Bihari Vajpayee (87) and M. S. Swaminathan (87), while Sachin Tendulkar (39) was the youngest.

1. B. R. Ambedkar (1891–1956) Social reformer, regarded as "Father of Indian Constitution"
2. A. P. J. Abdul Kalam (1931–2015) Aerospace engineer, former President of India
3. Vallabhbhai Patel (1875–1950) Independence activist, first Deputy Prime Minister of India
4. Jawaharlal Nehru (1889–1964) Independence activist, first Prime Minister of India
5. Mother Teresa (1910–1997) Social worker, founder of Missionaries of Charity
6. J. R. D. Tata (1904–1993) Industrialist, former Chairman of Tata Sons
7. Indira Gandhi (1917–1984) First female Prime Minister of India
8. Sachin Tendulkar (b. 1973) Cricketer
9. Atal Bihari Vajpayee (1924–2018) Former Prime Minister of India
10. Lata Mangeshkar (1929–2022) Singer
11. Jayaprakash Narayan (1902–1979) Independence activist and social reformer
12. Kanshi Ram (1934–2006) Social reformer, founder of the BSP
13. Ram Manohar Lohia (1910–1967) Independence activist and socialist leader
14. C. Rajagopalachari (1878–1972) First Indian Governor-General of India
15. Sam Manekshaw (1914–2008) Chief of the Army Staff of the Indian Army, first Field Marshal of India
16. Mahendra Singh Dhoni (b. 1983) Cricketer
17. Baba Amte (1914–2008) Social worker
18. Ela Bhatt (1933–2022) Social reformer, founder of SEWA
19. Vinoba Bhave (1895–1982) Philosopher and advocate of nonviolence
20. Kamaladevi Chattopadhyay (1903–1988) Independence activist
21. Ravi Shankar (1920–2012) Hindustani musician, sitarist
22. M. S. Subbulakshmi (1916–2004) Carnatic vocalist
23. M. F. Husain (1915–2011) Painter and film director
24. Bismillah Khan (1916–2006) Hindustani musician, shehnai player
25. R. K. Narayan (1906–2001) Writer and novellist
26. R. K. Laxman (1921–2015) Cartoonist, illustrator, and humorist
27. B. K. S. Iyengar (1918–2014) Teacher and founder of Iyengar Yoga
28. Amitabh Bachchan (b. 1942) Film actor
29. Raj Kapoor (1924–1988) Actor and filmmaker
30. Kamal Haasan (b. 1954) Actor and filmmaker
31. Satyajit Ray (1921–1992) Filmmaker
32. A. R. Rahman (b. 1967) Music composer and philanthropist
33. Kishore Kumar (1929–1987) Actor, playback singer
34. Dilip Kumar (1922–2021) Actor, producer and activist
35. Dev Anand (1923–2011) Actor and filmmaker
36. Mohammad Rafi (1924–1980) Singer
37. Homi Bhabha (1909–1966) Nuclear physicist, founding director of TIFR
38. Dhirubhai Ambani (1932–2002) Business tycoon, founder of Reliance Industries
39. Verghese Kurien (1921–2012) Social entrepreneur
40. Ghanshyam Das Birla (1894–1983) Businessman
41. N. R. Narayana Murthy (b. 1946) IT industrialist
42. Vikram Sarabhai (1919–1971) Physiscist and astronomer
43. M. S. Swaminathan (1925–2023) Geneticist
44. Ramnath Goenka (1904–1991) Newspaper publisher
45. Amartya Sen (b. 1933) Philosopher and economist
46. E. Sreedharan (b. 1932) Civil engineer
47. Kapil Dev (b. 1959) Cricketer
48. Sunil Gavaskar (b. 1949) Cricketer
49. Dhyan Chand (1905–1979) Hockey player
50. Viswanathan Anand (b. 1969) Chess Grandmaster

== Results ==
B. R. Ambedkar was generally approved of as the greatest Indian, with several prominent scholars writing articles congratulating him, including Ramachandra Guha and Outlook.

== See also ==
- Greatest Bengali of All Time
- 100 Greatest Britons
- Greatest Britons spin-offs

== Sources ==
- Gulzar; Nihalani, Govind; Chatterjee, Saibal, eds. (2003). Encyclopaedia of Hindi Cinema. Popular Prakashan. ISBN 978-81-7991-066-5.
