= The Greatest Frenchman =

2005 French TV show

Le Plus Grand Français de tous les temps ("The Greatest Frenchman of all Time") is a France 2 programme, which was aired in early 2005. It was based on an original series of Great Britons on the BBC. The show asked the French viewers who they thought was the Greatest Frenchman or Frenchwoman. The programme was presented by Michel Drucker and Thierry Ardisson. The final episode was broadcast at the French Senate.

The winner was former president and leader of the Free French movement Charles de Gaulle.

The show was criticized by some historians in that it focused only on personalities of recent French history. Key figures of French history who contributed to the founding of the French nation, such as national heroine Joan of Arc, kings Philip Augustus, Saint Louis, and Louis XIV, or Emperor Napoleon Bonaparte, were largely ignored.

== Top 10 ==
| Rank | Personality | Notability | Nomination defended by | Ref. |
|---|---|---|---|---|
| 1 | Charles De Gaulle (1890-1970) | General and president. Leader of the French resistance movement during World War II. President of France between 1944 and 1946 and between 1958 and 1969. Admired for giving post-war France international prestige and independence in their foreign policy. | Maurice Druon, historian | |
| 2 | Louis Pasteur (1822-1895) | Chemist. Discovered vaccination, microbial fermentation and pasteurization. Developed vaccines against rabies and anthrax. | | |
| 3 | Abbé Pierre (1912-2007) | Priest who was a member of the Resistance movement during World War II. Founder of the Emmaus movement, who help poor and homeless people. | | |
| 4 | Marie Skłodowska-Curie (1867-1934) | Polish physicist and chemist. Co-discoverer of radioactivity, radium and polonium. First woman to win the Nobel Prize in Physics (1903) and Nobel Prize in Chemistry (1911) and the only person to have won both. | | |
| 5 | Coluche (1944-1986) | Comedian, actor and humanitarian activist. Founder of the Restaurants du Coeur, a non-profit charity movement who distribute food to the needy and help people out with finding housing. | | |
| 6 | Victor Hugo (1802-1885) | Novelist, poet and playwright. Author of internationally famous and beloved works, such as The Hunchback of Notre-Dame and Les Misérables. Also campaigned for freedom of the press and against the death penalty and social injustice. | Max Gallo, novelist. | |
| 7 | Bourvil (1917-1970) | Comedian, actor and singer. His films and songs are still classics in France today and beloved in other countries too. | | |
| 8 | Molière (1612-1673) | Playwright. Creator of internationally renowned comedy plays such as Tartuffe, The Miser and The Misanthrope. Praised for his satirical wit, socially critical themes and vivid characters. Considered the most important and influential French-language author of all time. | | |
| 9 | Jacques Cousteau (1910-1997) | Explorer, inventor, documentary maker and oceanographer. Co-inventor of the Aqua-lung, which introduced modern underwater diving. Explored the oceans and made numerous documentaries about them. Championed for marine conservation. | | |
| 10 | Edith Piaf (1915-1963) | Singer. Internationally famous and beloved for tragic and passionate songs, such as "La Vie en Rose", "Hymne à l'amour", "Milord" and "Non, je ne regrette rien", which have been covered by numerous artists since. | | |

== From 11 to 102 ==
1. Marcel Pagnol (1895-1974) – novelist, playwright and film director
2. Georges Brassens (1921-1981) – singer and songwriter
3. Fernandel (1903-1971) – singer, actor and comedian
4. Jean de la Fontaine (1621-1695) – poet and fabulist
5. Jules Verne (1828-1905) – science fiction author
6. Napoleon Bonaparte (1769-1821) – military leader and emperor
7. Louis de Funès (1914-1983) – actor and comedian
8. Jean Gabin (1904-1976) – actor
9. Daniel Balavoine (1952-1986) – singer, songwriter and musician
10. Serge Gainsbourg (1928-1991) – singer and songwriter
11. Zinedine Zidane (1972-) – footballer
12. Charlemagne (748-814) – emperor
13. Lino Ventura (1919-1987) – actor
14. François Mitterrand (1916-1996) – president
15. Gustave Eiffel (1832-1923) – architect
16. Émile Zola (1840-1902) – novelist
17. Emmanuelle Cinquin (1908-2008) – religious sister and humanitarian
18. Jean Moulin (1899-1943) – leader of French resistance during World War II
19. Charles Aznavour (1924-2018) – singer, songwriter and actor
20. Yves Montand (1921-1991) – actor and singer
21. Jeanne d’Arc (1412-1431) – military leader
22. Général Leclerc (1902-1947) – military leader
23. Voltaire (1694-1778) – philosopher and novelist
24. Johnny Hallyday (1943-2017) – singer
25. Antoine de Saint-Exupéry (1900-1944) – aviator, novelist and poet
26. Claude Francois (1939-1978) – singer
27. Christian Cabrol – cardiologist and surgeon
28. Jean-Paul Belmondo (1933-2021) – actor
29. Jules Ferry (1832-1893) – politician and prime minister
30. Louis Lumière – inventor, film director
31. Michel Platini (1955-) – footballer
32. Jacques Chirac (1932-2019) – president and prime minister
33. Charles Trenet (1913-2001) – singer and songwriter
34. Georges Pompidou (1911-1974) – president and prime minister
35. Michel Sardou (1947-) – singer
36. Simone Signoret (1921-1985) – actress
37. Haroun Tazieff (1914-1998) – vulcanologist
38. Jacques Prévert (1900-1977) – poet
39. Éric Tabarly (1931-1998) – sailor
40. Louis XIV (1638-1715) – king
41. David Douillet (1969-) – judoka
42. Henri Salvador (1917-2008) – singer and comedian
43. Jean-Jacques Goldman (1951-) – singer, songwriter and musician
44. Jean Jaurès (1859-1914) – politician
45. Jean Marais (1913-1998) – actor and comedian
46. Yannick Noah (1960-) – tennis player
47. Albert Camus (1913-1960) – author and philosopher
48. Dalida (1933-1987) – singer
49. Léon Zitrone (1914-1995) – journalist
50. Nicolas Hulot (1955-) – journalist
51. Simone Veil (1927-2017) – politician
52. Alain Delon (1935-2024) – actor
53. Patrick Poivre d'Arvor (1947-) – journalist
54. Aimé Jacquet (1941-) – footballer
55. Francis Cabrel (1953-) – singer and songwriter
56. Brigitte Bardot (1934-2025) – actress
57. Guy de Maupassant (1850-1893) – author
58. Alexandre Dumas, père (1802-1870) – author and playwright
59. Honoré de Balzac (1799-1850) – novelist
60. Paul Verlaine (1844-1896) – poet
61. Jean-Jacques Rousseau (1712-1778) – author and philosopher
62. Maximilien de Robespierre (1758-1794) – political leader
63. Renaud (1952-) – singer and songwriter
64. Bernard Kouchner (1938-) – politician and humanitarian
65. Claude Monet (1840-1926) – painter
66. Michel Serrault (1928-2007) – actor
67. Pierre-Auguste Renoir (1841-1919) – painter
68. Michel Drucker (1942) – journalist
69. Raimu (1883-1946) – actor and comedian
70. Vercingetorix (c.82BC-46BC) – chieftain who led resistance against the Roman army
71. Raymond Poulidor (1936-2019) – cyclist
72. Charles Baudelaire (1821-1867) – poet
73. Pierre Corneille (1606-1684) – playwright
74. Arthur Rimbaud (1854-1891) – poet
75. Georges Clemenceau (1841-1929) – prime minister, and journalist
76. Gilbert Bécaud (1927-2001) – singer, songwriter and musician
77. José Bové (1953-) – syndicalist
78. Jean Ferrat (1930-2010) – singer and songwriter
79. Lionel Jospin (1937-) – prime minister
80. Jean Cocteau (1889-1963) – dramatist, poet, playwright and filmmaker
81. Luc Besson (1959-) – film director
82. Tino Rossi (1907-1983) – singer
83. Pierre de Coubertin (1863-1937) – educator and founder of the modern Olympic Games
84. Jean Renoir (1894-1979) – film director
85. Gérard Philipe (1922-1959) – actor and comedian
86. Jean-Paul Sartre (1905-1980) – philosopher, novelist and playwright
87. Catherine Deneuve (1943-) – actress
88. Serge Reggiani (1922-2004) – actor, singer and comedian
89. Gérard Depardieu (1948-) – actor
90. Françoise Dolto (1908-1988) – psychoanalyst
91. René Descartes (1596-1650) – philosopher, mathematician, and scientist
92. Blaise Pascal (1623-1662) – mathematician, physicist, inventor, writer and Catholic theologian

== See also ==
- Greatest Britons spin-offs
