= El Español de la Historia =

El Español de la Historia ("The Spaniard of History") was an Antena 3 show which aired in May 2007, based on the original BBC series 100 Greatest Britons. The show asked viewers about the Greatest Spanish man or woman in history via an opinion poll.

It was presented by Matías Prats and Susanna Griso, in just one session. The winner was the (then reigning monarch) King of Spain, Juan Carlos I.

The show was widely criticized and ignored by some historians in that it focused mainly on personalities of recent history and today's Spanish world. Some key figures of Spanish history were largely ignored.

== The Spaniard of History (Top 1–10) ==
Rank	Personality	Notability	Ref.
1	Juan Carlos I	King of Spain (1975–2014). Admired for moving his country back to democracy after nearly 40 years of dictatorship. His status also prevented a second attempt at a military coup in 1981. (He was the reigning monarch during the election broadcast.)	
2	Miguel de Cervantes	Novelist. Author of Don Quixote, a literary classic widely considered one of the best novels ever written. It has been translated in countless languages all over the world. Cervantes himself is also hailed as the most important and influential Spanish-language author of all time.	
3	Christopher Columbus	Explorer. Discovered America that kicked off European colonization of the continent by Spain and Portugal. Despite being born in Genua, Italy, Columbus worked for the Spanish crown.	
4	Sofía of Spain	Queen of Spain (1975–2014) (Born in Psychiko, Greece). Admired for her humanitarian works. (She was the reigning monarch during the election broadcast.)	
5	Adolfo Suárez	Prime Minister (1976–1981). Admired for moving his country back to a democracy after nearly 40 years of dictatorship.	
6	Santiago Ramón y Cajal	Physician. Investigated the central nervous system. Considered the "father of modern neuroscience." Awarded the Nobel Prize in Physiology or Medicine in 1906.	
7	Felipe VI of Spain	Crown Prince (during the election broadcast. Since 2014 king). Admired for his humanitarian work.	
8	Pablo Picasso	Painter and sculptor. Creator of works such as Les Demoiselles d'Avignon and Guernica. Widely praised as one of the most important, groundbreaking and influential artists of all time.	
9	Teresa of Ávila	Mystic, poet, theologian and writer. One of the most popular Catholic saints in Spain. Canonized in 1622.	
10	Felipe González	Prime Minister (1982–1996). Elected and re-elected a record-breaking four times in a row. Took the final steps in Spain's transition to democracy.	

== Top 11–100 ==
11. Isabella I of Castile, (1451–1504) Queen of Castile and León (1474–1504).

12. Severo Ochoa, (1905–1993) biochemist. Discovered mechanisms in the biological synthesis of RNA and DNA. Received the Nobel Prize in Physiology or Medicine in 1959.

13. Federico García Lorca, (1898–1936) poet and dramatist (Canciones).

14. José Luis Rodríguez Zapatero, (1960–) Prime Minister of Spain (2004–2011).

15. Letizia Ortiz, (1972–) crown princess (at the time of the election broadcast. Since 2014 Queen.)

16. Salvador Dalí, (1904–1989) painter (The Persistence of Memory).

17. Antoni Gaudí, (1852–1926) architect (La Sagrada Familia).

18. Rodrigo Díaz de Vivar, nicknamed El Cid, (c. 1040 – 1099) nobleman, military and political leader.

19. Alfonso X El Sabio, (1221–1284) King of Castile, León and Galicia (1252–1284).

20. Fernando Alonso, (1981–) Formula One racing driver.

21. Francisco de Goya, (1746–1828) painter and printmaker (The Third of May 1808, Los Desastres de la Guerra).

22. Francisco Franco, (1892–1975) generalissimo and Caudillo of Spain (1936–1975).

23. Antonio Machado, (1875–1939) poet (Campos de Castilla).

24. Miguel Indurain, (1964–) cyclist.

25. Miguel Servet, (1511–1553) theologian, physician, and humanist (Christianismi Restitutio)

26. Lola Flores, (1923–1995) singer, dancer, and actress.

27. Felipe II (Philip II), (1527–1598) king (1558–1598).

28. Carlos I (Charles V), (1500–1558) king (1516–1556) and Holy Roman Emperor (1519–1556).

29. Rocío Jurado, (1944–2006) singer and actress.

30. Gregorio Marañón, (1887–1960) physician, scientist, historian, writer and philosopher.

31. Diego Velázquez, (1599–1660) painter (Las Meninas)

32. Isabel Pantoja, (1956–) singer.

33. José Ortega y Gasset, (1883–1955) philosopher (The Revolt of the Masses)

34. Miguel de Unamuno, (1864–1936) essayist, novelist, poet, playwright and philosopher (Abel Sánchez: The History of a Passion).

35. José María Aznar, (1953–) Prime Minister (1996–2004).

36. Vicente Ferrer, (1350–1419) Dominican missionary and logician.

37. Camilo José Cela, (1916–2002) novelist (The Hive). Received the Nobel Prize in Literature in 1989.

38. Pedro Duque, (1963 – ) astronaut. First Spaniard in space.

39. Dani Pedrosa, (1985–) motorcycle racer.

40. Pau Gasol, (1980–) basketball player.

41. David Bisbal, (1979–) pop singer.

42. Rafael Nadal, (1986– ) tennis player.

43. José Monje Camarón, (1950–1992) flamenco singer.

44. Pelagius of Asturias, (c. 685 – 737) king of the Visigoths. Founder of the Kingdom of Asturias.

45. Juan Ramón Jiménez, (1881–1958) poet (Platero). Received the Nobel Prize in Literature in 1956.

46. Santiago Carrillo, (1915–2012) politician. Leader of the Spanish Communist Party (1960–1982).

47. Antonio Banderas, (1960–) film actor and singer.

48. San Ignacio de Loyola, (c. 1491 – 1556) priest. Founder of the Society of Jesus.

49. Pedro Almodóvar, (1949–) film director, screenwriter and producer (Mujeres al borde de un ataque de nervios, Hable Con Ella, Todo Sobre Mi Madre, Volver).

50. Juan Sebastián Elcano, (1476–1526) explorer. Completed the first circumnavigation of Earth after Ferdinand Magellan's death.

51. Julio Iglesias, (1943–) pop singer.

52. Miguel Hernández, (1910–1942) poet ("Nanas de cebolla").

53. Joan Manuel Serrat, (1943–) singer ("Mediterráneo").

54. Felix Lope de Vega, (1562–1635) novelist, poet and playwright

55. El Greco, (1541–1614) painter.

56. Agustina de Aragón, (1786–1857) military, led Spanish resistance against Napoleon Bonaparte's army.

57. Joaquín Sabina, (1949–) singer and poet.

58. Rosalía de Castro, (1837–1885) novelist and poet (Follas Novas).

59. Ángel Nieto, (1947–2017) motor racer.

60. Manuel Azaña, (1880–1940) Spanish Prime Minister (1931–1933) (1936) and President (1936–1939)

61. Jordi Pujol, (1930–) politician.

62. Francisco de Quevedo, (1580–1645) poet (El Buscón)

63. Alejandro Sanz, (1968) pop singer

64. Alfredo Di Stéfano, (1926–2014) Argentine association football player, naturalized as Spanish citizen.

65. Hernán Cortés, (1485–1547) explorer. Discovered Mexico.

66. Carlos Sainz, (1962–) rally driver.

67. Paquirri, (1948–1984) bullfighter

68. Telmo Zarra, (1921–2014) association football player

69. Montserrat Caballé, (1933–2018) opera contralto singer.

70. Manuel de Falla, (1876–1946) composer (El Amor Brujo)

71. Isaac Peral, (1851–1895) engineer and military officer.

72. Plácido Domingo, (1941–) opera tenor singer.

73. Miguel Gila, (1919–2001) comedian and actor.

74. Luis Buñuel, (1900–1983) film director (Un Chien Andalou)

75. El Cordobés, (1936–) bullfighter.

76. Francisco Pizarro, (1476–1541) explorer. Discovered Peru.

77. Mariano Barbacid, (1949–) biochemist. Discovered the first oncogene.

78. Raúl, (1977–) association football player.

79. Emilio Butragueño, (1963–) association football player.

80. Francisco Fernández Ochoa (1950–2006) ("Paquito"), alpine skier.

81. Amancio Ortega, businessman (1936–) (Inditex).

82. Manolete, (1917–1947) bullfighter.

83. Eduardo Chillida, (1924–2002) sculptor.

84. Ferrán Adriá, (1962–) chef.

85. Arantxa Sánchez Vicario, (1971–) tennis player

86. Juan Antonio Samaranch, (1920–2010) sports administrator. Head of the International Olympic Committee (1980–2001).

87. Joaquin Rodrigo, (1901–1999) composer (Concierto de Aranjuez).

88. Emilio Botín, (1934–2014) businessman.

89. Josemaría Escrivá de Balaguer, (1902–1975) priest and activist. Founder of Opus Dei.

90. Francisco Gento, (1933–2022) association football player.

91. Severiano Ballesteros, (1957–2011) golf player.

92. Isaac Albéniz, (1860–1909) composer.

93. Federico Bahamontes, (1928–2023) cyclist.

94. Buenaventura Durruti, (1896–1936) resistance fighter during the Spanish Civil War.

95. Carmen Amaya, (1913–1963) flamenco dancer.

96. Vicente Blasco Ibáñez, (1867–1928) novelist, journalist, politician and film director. Wrote The Four Horsemen of the Apocalypse.

97. Manuel Santana, (1938–2021) tennis player.

98. Alicia Koplowitz, (1954–) businesswoman.

99. Antonio Ruiz Soler, (1921–1996) flamenco dancer and choreographer.

100. Ramón Areces, (1909–1989) businessman (El Corte Inglés).

== Other editions ==
Other countries have produced similar shows; see Greatest Britons spin-offs
