= Greatest Bengali of All Time =

2004 BBC poll and list

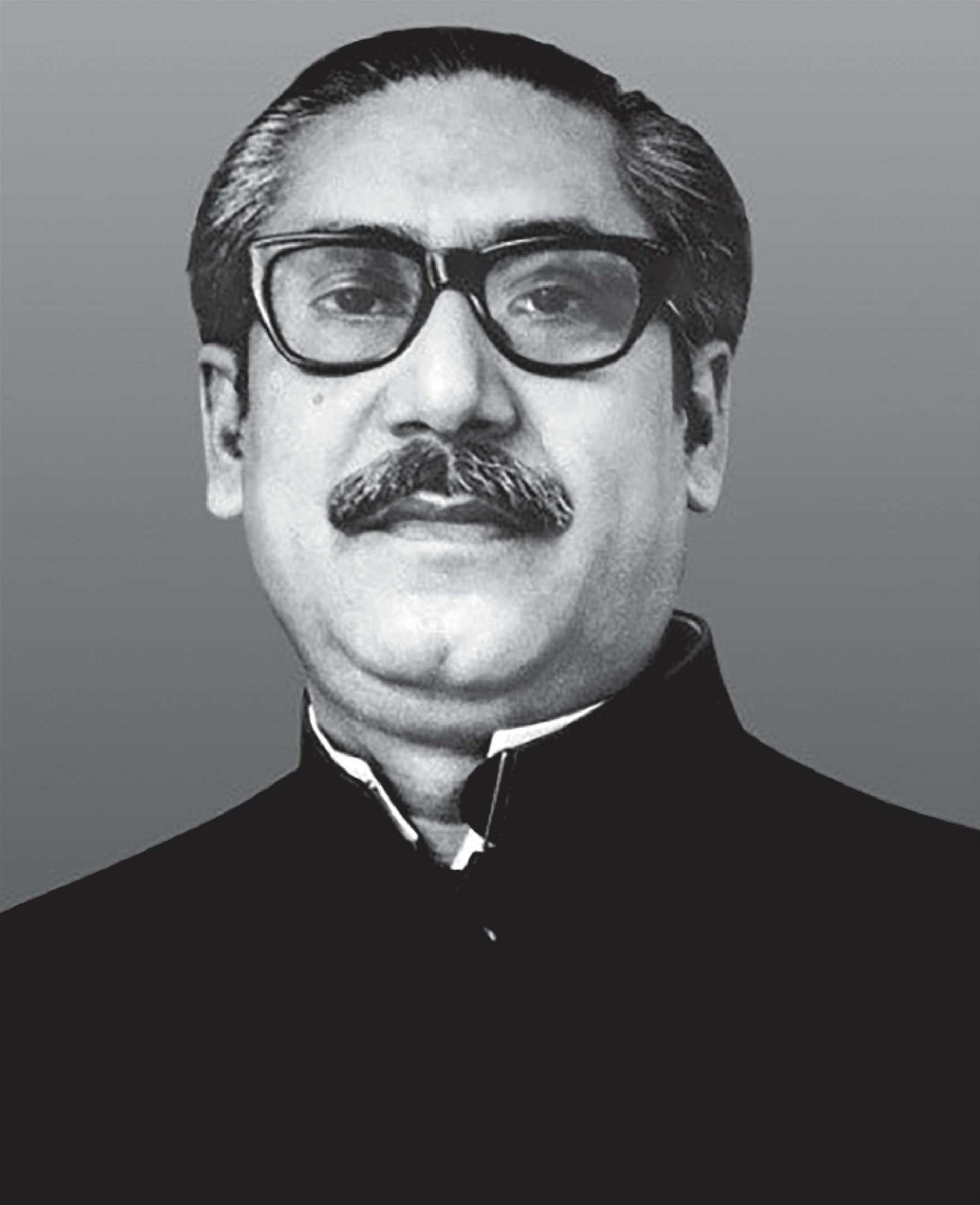
Sheikh Mujibur Rahman: Voted as the Greatest Bengali of all time in the 2004 BBC opinion poll

Soon after the completion of 100 Greatest Britons poll in 2002, the BBC organized a similar opinion poll to find out the greatest Bengali personalities throughout the history of Bengali people. In 2004, the BBC's Bengali Service conducted the opinion poll from 11 February to 22 March, with the title Greatest Bengali of All Time (Bengali: সর্বকালের সর্বশ্রেষ্ঠ বাঙালি, romanized: Śôrbôkālēr Śôrbôśrēṣṭhô Bāṅāli). Bengalis around the world, specifically from Bangladesh, India (states of West Bengal, Tripura, Odisha and Assam) and overseas Bengali communities participated in the poll.

A total of 140 nominations were produced from the opinion poll. The BBC Bangla started to announce the top 20 names from 26 March declaring one name each day starting from 20th position. On 14 April, the final day, which was also the Pohela Boishakh (Bengali New Year's day), the BBC announced Sheikh Mujibur Rahman, the founding father of Bangladesh, as the Greatest Bengali of All Time voted by Bengalis worldwide.

== Methodology ==
Describing the process of voting, BBC's Bengali Service stated that to avoid any flaw or controversy, they followed the most modern method of opinion polling. Participants were asked to nominate their five choices of greatest Bengali personality on the order of preference instead of one. The top nominee of each voter was given five points, second nominee four points, thus eventually the fifth nominee got one point. On the basis of total points, the final list of the greatest Bengali poll was generated.

== Observations ==
BBC informed that Sheikh Mujibur Rahman bagged almost double points than the second place holder Rabindranath Tagore, while Tagore himself secured double points than Kazi Nazrul Islam and Nazrul got double than A. K. Fazlul Huq. The other 17 personalities however had narrow differences of points with each other. Along with highest six politicians, the list also contains several authors and social reformers. Also two religious preachers, one scientist and one economist got place in the final list. Begum Rokeya was the only woman and Amartya Sen only living personality to be voted in top 20. No individual from the Bengal Sultanate and Mughal Bengal was nominated in the poll.

== Top 20 list ==
| Rank | Name | Title | Image | Introduction | Notability |
|---|---|---|---|---|---|
| 1 | Sheikh Mujibur Rahman (1920‑1975) | Bangabandhu^{(Friend of Bengal)} | | Politician Leader of Independence; President; Prime Minister | Founding Father of Bangladesh. Firebrand politician who shook the foundation of Pakistan by breaking away its eastern wing (East Bengal or East Pakistan) as the sovereign state of Bangladesh. Led Bengalis' decade-long struggle for independence against the then autocratic regime, finally resulting in the Bangladesh Liberation War and the independence of Bangladesh in 1971. Served twice as President and once as Prime Minister of Bangladesh after independence. Assassinated along with almost his entire family in a military coup in 1975. |
| 2 | Rabindranath Tagore (1861‑1941) | Bishwakobi / Gurudev^{(Poet of the World / Divine Mentor)} | | Author Nobel Prize Winner | Bengali polymath. Referred by many as the Bengali Shakespeare. Most successful and influential writer in Bengali literature. First Nobel Prize winner from Asia. Composer of national anthems of India and Bangladesh. |
| 3 | Kazi Nazrul Islam (1899‑1976) | Bidrohi Kobi^{(Rebel Poet)} | | Author National Poet | Renown for lifelong struggle and fiery writings against British colonial rule. Equally popular for romantic and religious (both Islamic and Hindu) poems and songs. Made National Poet of Bangladesh in 1972. |
| 4 | A. K. Fazlul Huq (1873‑1962) | Sher-e-Bangla^{(Tiger of Bengal)} | | Politician Prime Minister; Chief Minister; Governor | First Prime Minister of undivided Bengal during British rule. First ever democratically elected leader of Bengali nation. Renowned for unshakeable stance on principles and for pro-poor policies. After partition, served as Chief Minister and Governor of East Pakistan. |
| 5 | Subhas Chandra Bose (1897‑1945) | Netaji^{(Honorable Leader)} | | Politician Nationalist Activist | One of the principal figures of Indian independence movement. Built own army to fight against British colonial rule. Visited around the globe to seek support and assistance for India's independence. |
| 6 | Begum Rokeya (1880‑1932) | | | Social Reformer | Pioneer of Bengali Muslim women uprising. Within the conservative socio-system of her time, managed to educate herself and later became a popular writer and educationist. Inspired millions of girls and women to educate themselves and obtain self-reliance. |
| 7 | Jagadish Chandra Bose (1858‑1937) | Acharya^{(Influential Mentor)} | | Scientist | Major pioneer in researching radio and microwave optics. Made groundbreaking contributions to plant science. Laid the foundation of experimental science in Indian subcontinent. |
| 8 | Ishwar Chandra Vidyasagar (1820‑1891) | Vidyasagar^{(Ocean of Knowledge)} | | Social Reformer | Modified Bengali alphabet and typography. Introduced social reforms including widow marriage in the region. |
| 9 | Abdul Hamid Khan Bhashani (1880‑1976) | Mazlum Jananeta^{(Leader of the Oppressed)} | | Politician | Influential political figure served during British India, Pakistan and Bangladesh period. Gained mass popularity for lifelong solidarity with the oppressed. |
| 10 | Ram Mohan Roy (1772‑1833) | Raja^{(Lord)} | | Social Reformer | Advocated for social reforms like demolition of Sati ritual, child marriage and giving property inheritance rights for women. |
| 11 | Syed Mir Nisar Ali Titumir (1782‑1831) | | | Rebel Activist | Renowned for confrontations with landlords and British colonial rulers. Became legend after building iconic bamboo fort and fought against British soldiers from there. |
| 12 | Lalon Shah (?‑1890) | Baul Samrat^{(Emperor of Bauls)} | | Mystic Song Composer Philosopher | Cultural icon of Bengal and most celebrated Baul saint in history. Often compared with Confucius of China. Inspired prominent figures from Tagore, Nazrul to Allen Ginsberg. |
| 13 | Satyajit Ray (1921‑1992) | | | Filmmaker Academy Award Winner | Second Oscar winner from India. One of the most successful writers in modern age Bengali literature. Showed great talent in music and drawing. |
| 14 | Amartya Sen (1933‑) | | | Economist Nobel Prize Winner | Prominent economist. Won Nobel Prize in economics. |
| 15 | Language Movement Martyrs (1952) | Bhasha Shaheed^{(Language Martyrs)} | | University Students | Shot dead on 21 February 1952 while carrying mass procession against then Pakistan government's decision to not proclaim Bengali as country's official language. The day is now observed worldwide as International Mother Language Day after UNESCO's declaration in 1999. |
| 16 | Muhammad Shahidullah (1885‑1969) | | | Educationist | Prominent educationist, linguist and researcher on Bengali language. |
| 17 | Swami Vivekananda (1863‑1902) | | | Religious Preacher | One of principal representatives of Hinduism to western world. Prominent promoter of Yoga. |
| 18 | Atisa Dipamkara (c. 982‑1054) | Srigyan^{(Divine knowledge)} | | Religious Preacher | Bengali Buddhist spiritual leader. Brought Buddhism to Bengal and helped to spread from Sumatra to Tibet. |
| 19 | Ziaur Rahman (1936‑1981) | | | Military Personnel Freedom Fighter; President | One of the war heroes of Bangladesh Liberation War. Announced Declaration of Independence on behalf of Sheikh Mujibur Rahman. Former president and former army chief of Bangladesh. Founder of SAARC. |
| 20 | Huseyn Shaheed Suhrawardy (1892‑1963) | | | Politician Prime Minister | Influential Bengali politician served as Prime Minister of undivided Bengal during British rule and later Prime Minister of Pakistan. |

== See also ==
- The Greatest Indian
- 100 Greatest Britons
- Greatest Britons spin-offs
