= The Top 100 Historical Persons in Japan =

The Top 100 Historical Persons (超大型歴史アカデミー史上初1億3000万人が選ぶニッポン人が好きな偉人ベスト100発表), aired on Nippon Television on May 7, 2006. The program featured the results of a survey that asked Japanese people to choose their favorite great person from history. The show featured several re-enactments of scenes from the lives of the people on the list.

The survey asked Japanese people to name their most-liked historical figures, not the most influential. The selection was not restricted to Japanese people, and only about two thirds of the names are Japanese, mostly important Japanese historical figures, such as samurai, prime ministers, war leaders, authors, poets, and popular Meiji Restoration figures.

The program was followed up with a women-only Top-100 list (ニッポン人が好きな100人の美人) which aired September 23, 2006, and History's 100 Most Influential People: Hero Edition which aired in March 2007.

== List ==
The final list was as follows:

1. (Japan) Oda Nobunaga (1534–1582) daimyō in the 16th century
2. Sakamoto Ryōma (1836–1867) The samurai who overthrew the Tokugawa shogunate in bakumatsu Japan
3. Toyotomi Hideyoshi (1537–1598) politician, samurai who is regarded as Japan's second "great unifier"
4. (Japan) Matsushita Kōnosuke (1894–1989) industrialist, founder of Panasonic
5. (Japan) Tokugawa Ieyasu (1543–1616) The founder and first shōgun of the Tokugawa shogunate
6. Minamoto Yoshitsune (1159–1189) A military commander of the Minamoto clan of Japan in the late Heian and early Kamakura periods
7. (Kosovo) (India) Mother Teresa (1910–1997) Roman Catholic nun and missionary
8. (United States) Helen Keller (1880–1968) author and lecturer who was a deaf-blind person to earn a Bachelor of Arts degree
9. (Japan) Hijikata Toshizō (1835–1869) Fukucho of Shinsengumi, a great swordsman and a talented military leader who resisted the Meiji Restoration
10. (Japan) Noguchi Hideyo (1876–1928) bacteriologist who in 1911 discovered the agent of syphilis as the cause of progressive paralytic disease
11. (Japan) Saigō Takamori (1828–1877) One of the three great nobles who led the Meiji Restoration
12. (United Kingdom) Diana, Princess of Wales (1961–1997) Member of British royal family, philanthropist and known for her charity work
13. (Germany) (United States) Albert Einstein (1879–1955) physicist, known for theory of relativity
14. (Japan) Misora Hibari (1937–1989) singer and actress
15. (Japan) Fukuzawa Yukichi (1835–1901) Japanese author, writer, teacher, translator, entrepreneur and journalist who founded Keio University
16. (Germany) (Netherlands) Anne Frank (1929–1945) diarist, known for "Het Achterhuis"
17. (United Kingdom) Florence Nightingale (1820–1910) founder of modern nursing, social reformer and statistician
18. Yoshida Shigeru (1878–1967) Prime Minister of Japan
19. (United States) Walt Disney (1901–1966) Entrepreneur, animator, voice actor and film producer
20. (Germany) Ludwig van Beethoven (1770–1827) German composer and pianist
21. (Brazil) Ayrton Senna (1960–1994) One of the greatest Formula One drivers of all time
22. (Italy) Leonardo da Vinci (1452–1519) polymath, universal genius
23. (Japan) Tezuka Osamu (1928–1989) Manga artist who created Astro Boy, cartoonist, animator, film producer, medical doctor
24. Napoleon Bonaparte (1769–1821) Emperor of France
25. Prince Shōtoku (574–622) Semi-legendary regent and a politician of the Asuka period in Japan who served under Empress Suiko
26. (United Kingdom) John Lennon (1940–1980) Member of The Beatles
27. (China) Zhuge Liang (181–234) Imperial Chancellor and regent of the state of Shu Han during the Three Kingdoms period
28. (Japan) Miyamoto Musashi (1584–1645) Japanese swordsman, philosopher, writer and rōnin
29. (Japan) Ozaki Yutaka (1965–1992) Musician
30. (United Kingdom) Audrey Hepburn (1929–1993) British actress during Hollywood's Golden Age, dancer and humanitarian
31. (India) Mahatma Gandhi (1869–1948) activist, that led to Indian independence movement against British rule
32. (Japan) Soseki Natsume (1867–1916) novelist
33. Takasugi Shinsaku (1839–1867) Samurai from the Chōshū Domain of Japan who contributed significantly to the Meiji Restoration
34. (Japan) Murasaki Shikibu novelist and poet
35. Wolfgang Amadeus Mozart (1756–1791) Austria's greatest composer
36. (Japan) Yamamoto Isoroku (1884–1943) Marshal Admiral of the Navy and the commander-in-chief of the Combined Fleet during World War II
37. (Japan) Miyazawa Kenji (1896–1933) author for children's literature
38. John F. Kennedy (1917–1963) 35th President of United States
39. (Japan) Ninomiya Sontoku (1787–1856) Agricultural leader, philosopher, moralist and economist
40. (Japan) Kondō Isami (1834–1868) Japanese swordsman and official of the late Edo period
41. Ōkubo Toshimichi (1830–1878) Main founders of Modern Japan
42. Takeda Shingen (1521–1573) pre-eminent daimyō in feudal Japan
43. Himiko (d. 248) was a shaman queen of Yamataikoku in Wa (ancient Japan)
44. Inō Tadataka (1745–1818) surveyor and cartographer, completed the first map of Modern Japan
45. (Japan) Ishihara Yujiro (1934–1987) actor and singer
46. (Japan) Sen no Rikyū (1522–1591) Prominent figure who had influence on chanoyu, the Japanese "Way of Tea", particularly the tradition of wabi-cha
47. (United Kingdom) Charlie Chaplin (1889–1977) actor of Silent Era
48. (Japan) Sugihara Chiune (1900–1986) Government official who served as vice consul for the Japanese Empire in Lithuania
49. Date Masamune (1567–1636) Regional ruler of Japan's Azuchi–Momoyama period through early Edo period
50. Tanaka Giichi (1864–1929) Prime Minister of Japan
51. (United States) Bruce Lee (1940–1973) Hong Kong actor and martial artist
52. (Japan) Okita Sōji (1842–1868) The captain of the first unit of the Shinsengumi, a special police force in Kyoto during the late shogunate period
53. Matsuda Yusaku (1949–1989) One of Japan's most important actors
54. (Austria) Marie Antoinette (1755–1793) The last Queen of France before the French Revolution
55. (Japan) Ōishi Kuranosuke (1659–1703) (karō) of the Akō Domain in Harima Province
56. (Japan) Ikariya Chosuke (1931–2004) comedian and film actor
57. (United States) Wright Brothers
58. (Japan) Katsu Kaishū (1823–1899) statesman and naval engineer during the late Tokugawa shogunate and early Meiji period
59. (United States) Martin Luther King Jr. (1929–1968) civil rights activist for black people
60. (Japan) Yoshida Shōin (1830–1859) distinguished intellectual in the closing days of the Tokugawa shogunate
61. Kurosawa Akira (1910–1998) Japan's greatest director
62. (Japan) Uesugi Kenshin (1530–1578) daimyō
63. (Poland) (France) Marie Curie (1867–1934) physicist and chemist, first woman to win a Nobel Prize
64. Satō Eisaku (1901–1975) Prime Minister of Japan
65. (Japan) Sanada Yukimura (1567–1615) Samurai warrior of the Sengoku period
66. (China) Cao Cao (155–220) Chinese warlord and the penultimate Chancellor of the Eastern Han dynasty
67. (Japan) Kato Daijiro (1976–2003) Grand Prix motorcycle road racer
68. (Greece) Cleopatra (69BC–30BC) the last active ruler of the Ptolemaic Kingdom of Egypt
69. (Japan) Tokugawa Mitsukuni (1628–1701) Prominent daimyō who was known for his influence in the politics of the early Edo period
70. (United States) Elvis Presley (1935–1977) King of Rock and Roll
71. (Japan) Ogi Akira (1935–2005) professional Japanese baseball player, coach and manager
72. Tōgō Heihachirō (1848–1934) Gensui or admiral of the fleet in the Imperial Japanese Navy and one of Japan's greatest naval heroes
73. (Italy) Christopher Columbus (1451–1506) Italian explorer, navigator, and colonizer that discovered America
74. (Japan) Itō Hirobumi (1841–1909) statesman and genrō
75. (Spain) Pablo Picasso (1881–1973) 20th century best painter
76. (Italy) Marco Polo (1254–1324) Italian explorer
77. (Germany) Albert Schweitzer (1875–1965) French-German theologian, organist, writer, humanitarian, philosopher, and physician
78. (Japan) Yosano Akiko (1878–1942) author and social activist
79. (Switzerland) Andy Hug (1964–2000) Swiss karateka and one of the best kickboxers
80. (Japan) Tsuburaya Eiji (1901–1970) special effects director, co-creator of Godzilla
81. (France) Joan of Arc (1412–1431) Roman Catholic saint
82. (Japan) Honda Minako (1967–2005) pop star
83. (Japan) Uemura Naomi (1941–1984) adventurer
84. (Japan) Sugita Genpaku (1733–1817) scholar known for his translation of Kaitai Shinsho
85. (China) Confucius (551BC–479BC) ancient philosopher
86. (France) Jean-Henri Casimir Fabre (1823–1915) French naturalist, entomologist
87. (Japan) Natsume Masako (1957–1985) actress
88. (Portugal) Ferdinand Magellan (1480–1521) Portuguese explorer who organised the Spanish expedition to the East Indies from 1519 to 1522
89. (Japan) Honda Soichiro (1906–1991) engineer, founder of Honda
90. (United States) Anne Sullivan (1866–1937) teacher, lifelong companion of Helen Keller
91. Shohei "Giant" Baba (1938–1999) professional wrestler, co-founder of All Japan Pro Wrestling
92. Abraham Lincoln (1809–1865) 16th President of United States
93. (Japan) Dazai Osamu (1909–1948) author
94. (Poland) Frédéric Chopin (1810–1849) Polish composer
95. (Japan) Ikkyū (1391–1481) iconoclastic Japanese Zen Buddhist monk and poet
96. Akechi Mitsuhide (1528–1582) samurai and general who lived during the Sengoku period of Feudal Japan
97. (United Kingdom) Isaac Newton (1642–1727) physicist and theologian, known for implementing the law of gravity
98. (Japan) Matsuo Bashō (1644–1694) most known poet during Edo period
99. (United Kingdom) Arthur Conan Doyle (1859–1930) writer, known for creating the character Sherlock Holmes

== See also ==
- Greatest Britons spin-offs
