= Stevo Karapandža =

Yugoslav, Croatian and Serbian chef

- Стево Карапанџа
- Born: Stevo Karapandža; 13 September 1947 (age 78); Karlovac, PR Croatia, FPR Yugoslavia
- Spouse: Renata
- Children: 2
- Culinary career
- Television show(s): Little Secrets of Great Chefs MasterChef Croatia

Stevo Karapandža (Serbian Cyrillic: Стево Карапанџа) born 13th September 1947 is a Yugoslavian, Croatian and Serbian celebrity chef. With Ivo Serdar, and later Oliver Mlakar, he co-hosted the popular Yugoslav weekly cooking show Little Secrets of Great Chefs produced by TV Zagreb starting in 1974.

At the start of the Yugoslav Wars in 1991, he received numerous threats from Croatian nationalists because of his Serb origins. He then left Zagreb for Italy and settled in Switzerland, where he lived 24 years and operated a restaurant in Ennetbaden before retiring.

Of paternal Serb and maternal Croat descent, in 2004 he was ranked tenth in the Greatest Croatian poll conducted by Croatian weekly Nacional.

The author of a number of popular cookbooks dating back to the 1980s, Karapandža's cookbook Moji najdraži recepti (My Favorite Recipes) was published in 2009.
