= Greatest Britons spin-offs =

The following is a list of spin-offs of the 2002 100 Greatest Britons program produced by the BBC.

== List by country or region ==
Country	Broadcaster / Magazine	Name (with English translation where applicable)	Winner	Airdate
Argentina	Telefe	El Gen Argentino (The Argentine Gene)	José de San Martín	October 2007
Australia	ABC	The Greatest Australian	Howard Walter Florey	January 2004
Bangladesh / India	BBC Bengali	Greatest Bengali of all time	Sheikh Mujibur Rahman	March/April 2004
Belgium	Het Nieuwsblad	Belg der Belgen (lit. 'Belgian of Belgians')	Father Damien	December 2005
Flanders, Belgium	VRT	De Grootste Belg (lit. 'The Greatest Belgian')	Father Damien	December 2005
Wallonia, Belgium	RTBF	Les plus grands Belges (lit. 'The Greatest Belgians')	Jacques Brel	December 2005
Brazil	SBT	O Maior Brasileiro de Todos os Tempos (lit. 'The Greatest Brazilian of All Time')	Chico Xavier	October 2012
Bulgaria	BNT Channel 1	Velikite Balgari (lit. 'The Great Bulgarians')	Vasil Levski	February 2007
Canada	CBC	The Greatest Canadian	Tommy Douglas	October 2004
Catalonia	TV3	El Favorit (lit. 'The Favorite')	Jaume I	June 2005
Chile	TVN	Grandes Chilenos (lit. 'Great Chileans')	Salvador Allende	2008
Colombia	History Channel	El Gran Colombiano (lit. 'The Great Colombian')	Álvaro Uribe	June 2013
Croatia	Nacional	Najveći Hrvat (lit. 'Greatest Croatian')	Josip Broz Tito	2003
Czech Republic	Czech Television	Největší Čech (lit. 'The Greatest Czech')	Charles IV, Holy Roman Emperor	May/June 2005
Ecuador	Ecuavisa	El Mejor Ecuatoriano (lit. 'The Greatest Ecuadorian')	Eloy Alfaro	2005
Finland	YLE	Suuret Suomalaiset (lit. 'Great Finns')	Carl Gustaf Emil Mannerheim	2004
France	France 2	Le Plus Grand Français (lit. 'The Greatest Frenchman')	Charles de Gaulle	April 2005
Georgia	GPB	Best Georgians (საქართველოს დიდი ათეული, (lit. 'Our Best')	David IV of Georgia (at the ending of the voting)	2008 (broadcasting was stopped)
Germany	ZDF	Unsere Besten (lit. 'Our Best')	Konrad Adenauer	November 2003
Greece	Skai TV	Great Greeks	Alexander the Great	January 2009
Hungary	Múlt-kor Történelmi portál	A magyar történelem legkiemelkedőbb alakjai (lit. 'The most prominent figures of Hungarian history')	Matthias Corvinus	2008
India	Outlook	The Greatest Indian	B. R. Ambedkar	12 August 2012
Ireland	RTÉ	Ireland's Greatest	John Hume	22 October 2010
Italy	RAI	Il più grande italiano di tutti i tempi (lit. 'The Greatest Italian of All Time')	Leonardo da Vinci	February 2010
Japan	Nippon Television	The Top 100 Historical Persons in Japan	Oda Nobunaga	May 2006
Netherlands	KRO	De Grootste Nederlander (lit. 'The Greatest Dutchman')	Pim Fortuyn (first during live broadcast); Willem van Oranje (first by total votes)	November 2004
New Zealand	TVNZ	New Zealand's Top 100 History Makers	Ernest Rutherford	November 2005
Poland	TVP	Polak Wszechczasów (lit. 'Pole of All Time')	Józef Piłsudski	planned
Portugal	RTP	Os Grandes Portugueses (lit. 'Great Portuguese People')	António de Oliveira Salazar	October 2006
Romania	TVR	Mari Români (lit. 'Great Romanians')	Ștefan cel Mare	October 2006
Russia	Russia TV Channel	Name of Russia	St. Alexander Nevsky	2008
Slovakia	Radio and Television of Slovakia	Najväčší Slovák (lit. 'The Greatest Slovak')	Milan Rastislav Štefánik	Started on 28 October 2018
South Africa	SABC	Great South Africans	Nelson Mandela	September 2004
Spain	Antena 3	El Español de la Historia (lit. 'The Spaniard of History')	King Juan Carlos I	May 2007
Spain	La 1	El mejor de la historia (lit. 'The Best in History')	Santiago Ramón y Cajal	February-March 2024
Ukraine	Inter	The Greatest Ukrainians	Yaroslav I the Wise	October 2007
United States	Discovery Channel	The Greatest American	Ronald Reagan	June 2005
Uruguay	Canal 10	El Gran Uruguayo (lit. 'The Great Uruguayan')	José Gervasio Artigas	May 2018
Wales	BBC Radio Wales	100 Welsh Heroes (Radio Programme)	Aneurin Bevan	February 2004
