= Name of Russia (Russia TV) =

Russian limited television series

Name of Russia (Russian: Имя Россия, romanized: Imya Rossiya) was a series produced by the Russia-1 television channel that aimed to determine the most notable figure in Russian history through polling promoted via the Internet, Radio, and Television. Various professors, artists, and politicians would present information on the historical figure they were 'promoting', and people could then vote online for their chosen figure.

From the outset, the project received heavy criticism for many reasons. The information pages on the project website that linked to every personality (named dossier pages by project creators) were inaccurately named and filled with trivial and inconsistent details. Internet news agency Lenta.ru highlighted this and explained how ridiculous some of the mistakes were. The final list of 50 candidates also drew widespread criticism due to the inclusion of individuals without Russian ethnicity, such as the Georgian Joseph Stalin and Polish Marshal Konstantin Rokossovsky. Since brigading was allowed and no precautions against botting were taken, the voting was wildly inaccurate, with some candidates rising from the bottom of the list to the top in a matter of hours. On 14 August, new voting rules were introduced that included the use of challenge–response authentication in the form of a multiple-choice question. According to the project's management, this new measure was aimed to curb the 'war of machines' or computer-generated voting.

In his book Nothing Is True and Everything Is Possible: The Surreal Heart of the New Russia, author Peter Pomerantsev (working as a consultant for the Russian television industry at the time) claims the actual winner of the contest was Joseph Stalin, rather than Alexander Nevsky, and that the "embarrassed" producers had to rig the vote in favor of Nevsky.

== Candidates and results ==
The twelve candidates for greatest Russian were:

Final position	Candidate	Date of birth	Date of death	Promoter	Airdate
1	Alexander Nevsky, Grand prince of Novgorod and Vladimir	1220	1263	Mitropolit Kirill	5 October 2008
2	Pyotr Stolypin, prime minister of the Russian Empire	1862	1911	Film-director Nikita Mikhalkov	21 December 2008
3	Joseph Stalin, General Secretary of the Communist Party of the Soviet Union and Generalissimo during World War II	1878	1953	General of the army Valentin Varennikov	19 October 2008
4	Alexander Pushkin, writer and poet	1799	1837	Pushkinist and Soviet dissident Yuriy Kublanovskiy	17 December 2008
5	Peter the Great, first Emperor of Russia	1672	1725	RF Ambassador to Ukraine Viktor Chernomyrdin	12 October 2008
6	Vladimir Lenin, the revolutionary founder of the Soviet Union	1870	1924	CPRF general secretary Gennady Zyuganov	23 November 2008
7	Fyodor Dostoyevsky, writer	1821	1881	RF Ambassador in NATO Dmitriy Rogozin	9 November 2008
8	Alexander Suvorov, general of the Russian Imperial Army	1729	1800	Federation Council of Russia speaker Sergey Mironov	2 November 2008
9	Dmitri Mendeleev, chemist who invented the periodic table	1834	1907	Professor, vice-president RAES Sergei Kapitsa	26 October 2008
10	Ivan the Terrible, tsar	1530	1584	Painter Ilya Glazunov	14 December 2008
11	Catherine the Great, empress	1729	1796	Governor of Krasnodar Krai Aleksandr Tkachyov	16 November 2008
12	Alexander II, emperor who abolished serfdom in Russia	1818	1881	Director of RAS Russian history institute Andrey Sakharov	30 November 2008

== See also ==
- Greatest Britons spin-offs
