= The Greatest American =

- Presented by: Matt Lauer
- Country of origin: United States

Production
- Executive producer: Jason Raff

Original release
- Network: Discovery Channel
- Release: 5 June 2005

The Greatest American was a four-part American television series hosted by Matt Lauer in 2005. The show featured biographies and lists of influential persons in U.S. history, and culminated in a contest in which millions in the audience nominated and voted for the person they felt was the "greatest American". The four-part competition was conducted by AOL and the Discovery Channel and reported on by the BBC.

President Ronald Reagan achieved the highest position. His son, Ronald Reagan Jr., commented to the network that "I'm sure he would be very honored to be in the company of these great gentlemen." In total, the American public cast over 2.4 million votes during the nomination process.

In detail, Martin Luther King Jr. was the highest-ranked person of color, at number three, while Oprah Winfrey, at number nine, was the highest-ranked woman. George W. Bush, at number six, had the highest status of any living American.

== Nominations ==
Nominations were accepted through 31 January 2005. The seven-hour-long series was broken into four episodes: The first episode counted down the top 100 and introduced the top 25 nominees in alphabetical order. The second episode featured biographies of the top 25 nominees as well as commentaries from influential people such as celebrities and politicians. The third episode, called "The Great Debate", introduced the top five nominees and pitted the studio audience supporters of each of the nominees and a person selected to represent each of the top five candidates against a panel of three celebrities. In the finale, the top five "Greatest Americans" were announced as well as what percentage of the votes each had received. Votes were taken through a toll-free (if calling from a land line) phone number, through text messages from cellphones, and through online voting. Voters were allowed to vote three times per voting method, so anyone had a chance of voting at least nine times.

== Top twenty-five ==
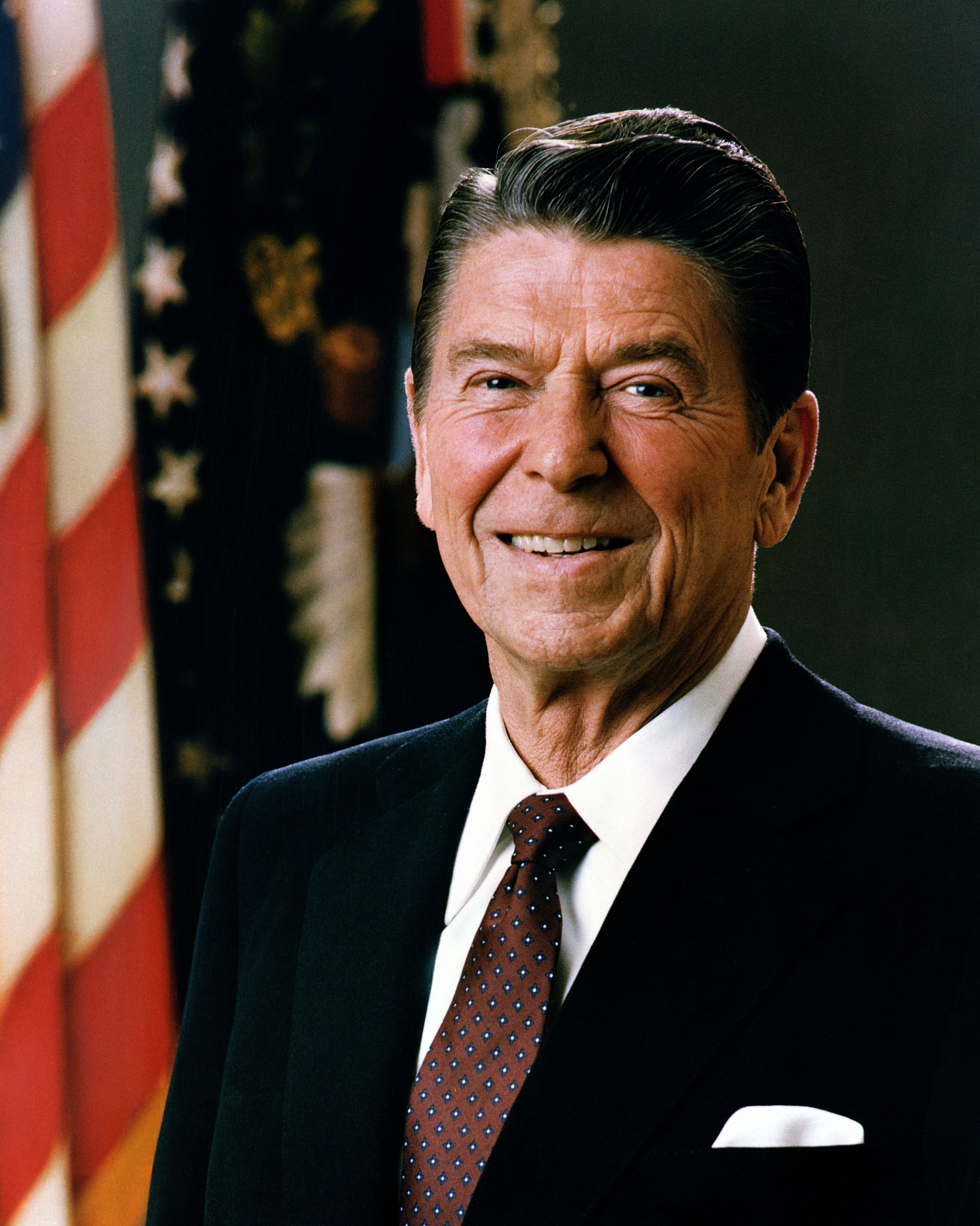
1. Ronald Reagan,
40th president of the United States (1981–89).

2. Abraham Lincoln,
16th president of the United States (1861–65).

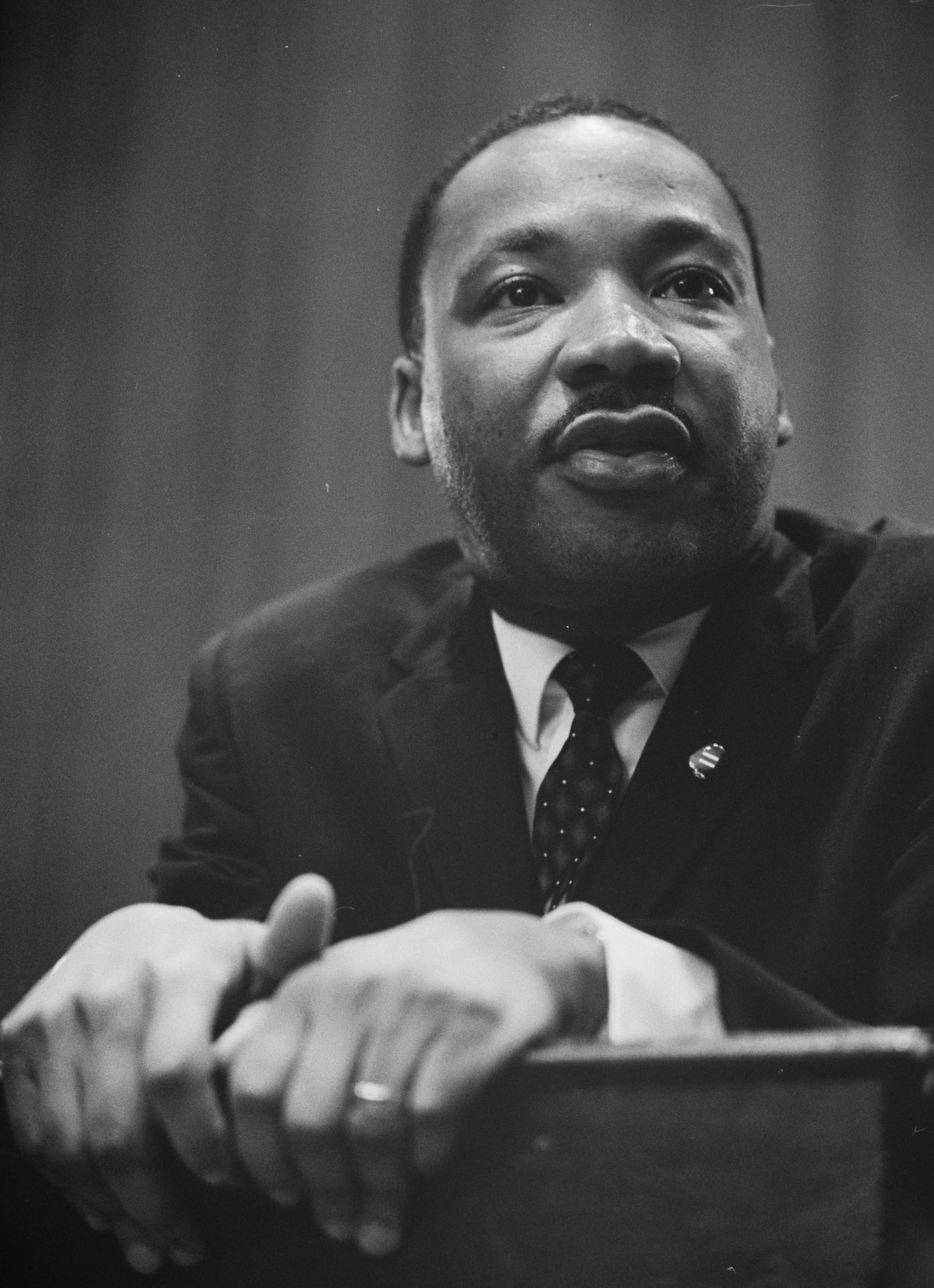
3. Martin Luther King Jr., civil rights activist.

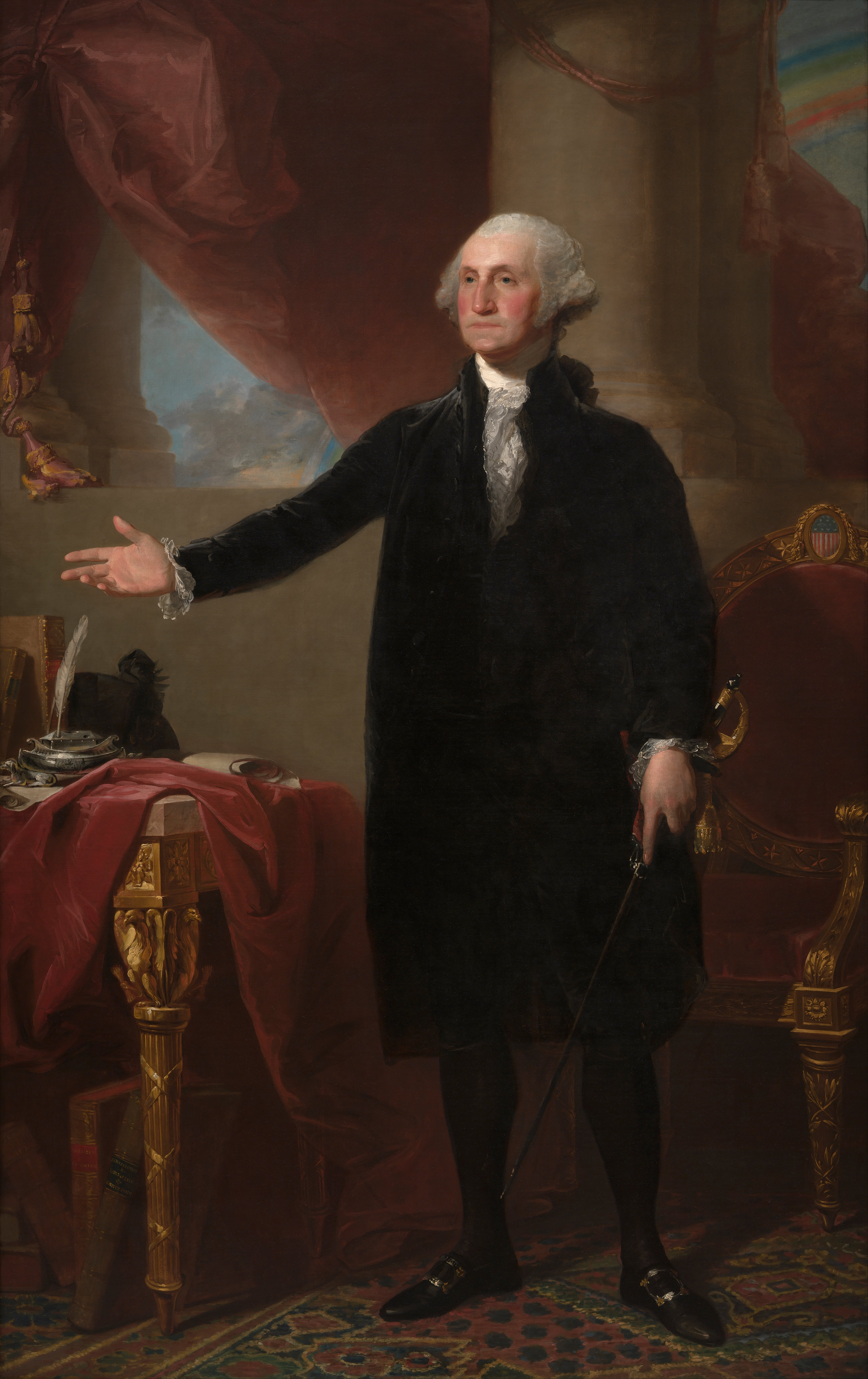
4. George Washington,
1st president of the United States (1789–97).

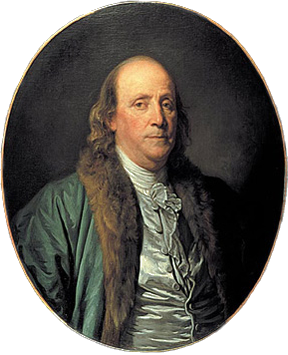
5. Benjamin Franklin,
author, inventor, statesman, and scientist.

rank	name	lifespan	known for
1	Ronald Reagan	1911–2004	actor, 40th president
2	Abraham Lincoln	1809–1865	16th president
3	Martin Luther King Jr.	1929–1968	minister, civil rights Leader
4	George Washington	1732–1799	general, 1st president
5	Benjamin Franklin	1706–1790	author, printer, scientist, politician
6	George W. Bush	born 1946	43rd president
7	Bill Clinton	born 1946	42nd president
8	Elvis Presley	1935–1977	musician, actor
9	Oprah Winfrey	born 1954	talk show host, actress
10	Franklin D. Roosevelt	1882–1945	32nd president
11	Billy Graham	1918–2018	minister
12	Thomas Jefferson	1743–1826	Writer, 3rd president
13	Walt Disney	1901–1966	animator, film producer
14	Albert Einstein	1879–1955	physicist
15	Thomas Alva Edison	1874–1931	inventor
16	John F. Kennedy	1917–1963	35th president
17	Bob Hope	1903–2003	actor, comedian
18	Bill Gates	born 1955	businessman
19	Eleanor Roosevelt	1884–1962	first lady, activist, diplomat
20	Lance Armstrong	born 1971	cyclist
21	Muhammad Ali	1942–2016	boxer
22	Rosa Parks	1913–2005	civil rights activist
23	The Wright Brothers	1867 & 1871 – 1912 & 1948	inventors, aviation pioneers
24	Henry Ford	1863–1947	industrialist, businessman
25	Neil Armstrong	1930–2012	astronaut

== Alphabetical list ==
On 18 April 2005, AOL and The Discovery Channel announced the top 100 nominees.

The remaining 75 nominees:

- Maya Angelou (1928–2014), poet and writer
- Susan B. Anthony (1820–1904), women's rights activist
- Lucille Ball (1911–1989), actress and comedian
- Alexander Graham Bell (1847–1922), inventor and scientist
- Barbara Bush (1925–2018), First Lady
- George H. W. Bush (1924–2018), 41st president
- Laura Bush (born 1946), First Lady
- Andrew Carnegie (1835–1919), industrialist and philanthropist
- Johnny Carson (1925–2005), comedian and talk show host
- Jimmy Carter (1924–2024), 39th president
- George Washington Carver (the 1860s–1943), botanist and inventor
- Ray Charles (1930–2004), musician
- César Chávez (1927–1993), labor leader and activist
- Hillary Clinton (born 1947), politician
- Bill Cosby (born 1937), comedian
- Tom Cruise (born 1962), actor
- Ellen DeGeneres (born 1958), comedian and talk show host
- Frederick Douglass (1818–1895), writer and abolitionist
- Amelia Earhart (1897–1937), aviator
- Clint Eastwood (born 1930), actor and film director
- John Edwards (born 1953), politician
- Dwight D. Eisenhower (1890–1969), general and 34th president
- Brett Favre (born 1969), football player
- Mel Gibson (born 1956), actor and film director
- Rudolph Giuliani (born 1944), politician
- John Glenn (1921–2016), astronaut and politician
- Alexander Hamilton (1757–1804), statesman and 1st Secretary of the Treasury
- Tom Hanks (born 1956), actor
- Hugh Hefner (1926–2017), magazine publisher
- Katharine Hepburn (1907–2003), actress
- Howard Hughes (1907–1979), businessman, film producer, and aviator
- Michael Jackson (1958–2009), musician, king of pop
- Steve Jobs (1955–2011), businessman and inventor
- Lyndon B. Johnson (1908–1973), 36th president
- Michael Jordan (born 1963), basketball player
- Helen Keller (1880–1968), author and activist
- Jacqueline Kennedy Onassis (1929–1994), First Lady
- Robert F. Kennedy (1925–1968), politician
- Rush Limbaugh (1951–2021), radio talk show host
- Charles Lindbergh (1902–1974), aviator
- George Lucas (born 1944), film director
- Madonna (born 1958), musician
- Malcolm X (1925–1965), civil rights activist
- Phil McGraw (born 1950), psychologist and television personality
- Marilyn Monroe (1926–1962), actress
- Michael Moore (born 1954), documentary filmmaker
- Audie Murphy (1925–1971), soldier
- Richard M. Nixon (1913–1994), 37th president
- Barack Obama (born 1961), politician (became 44th president after airing)
- Jesse Owens (1913–1980), track and field athlete
- George S. Patton (1885–1945), general
- Colin Powell (1937–2021), politician and general
- Christopher Reeve (1952–2004), actor
- Condoleezza Rice (born 1954), politician and diplomat
- Jackie Robinson (1919–1972), baseball player
- Theodore Roosevelt (1858–1919), writer, explorer, naturalist, and 26th president
- Babe Ruth (1895–1948), baseball player
- Carl Sagan (1934–1996), astronomer and writer
- Jonas Salk (1914–1995), medical researcher
- Arnold Schwarzenegger (born 1947), actor and politician
- Frank Sinatra (1915–1998), musician and actor
- Joseph Smith, Jr. (1805–1844), religious leader
- Steven Spielberg (born 1946), film director
- James Stewart (1908–1997), actor
- Martha Stewart (born 1941), businesswoman, writer, and television personality
- Nikola Tesla (1856–1943), inventor
- Pat Tillman (1976–2004), football player and soldier
- Harry S. Truman (1884–1972), 33rd president
- Donald Trump (born 1946), businessman (became the 45th and 47th president after airing)
- Harriet Tubman (1822–1913), abolitionist
- Mark Twain (1835–1910), writer and humorist
- Sam Walton (1918–1992), businessman
- John Wayne (1907–1979), actor
- Tiger Woods (born 1975), golfer
- Chuck Yeager (1923–2020), aviator

== Other editions ==
Other countries have produced similar shows, see also: Greatest Britons spin-offs
