= Mirko and Stjepan Seljan =

Croatian explorers

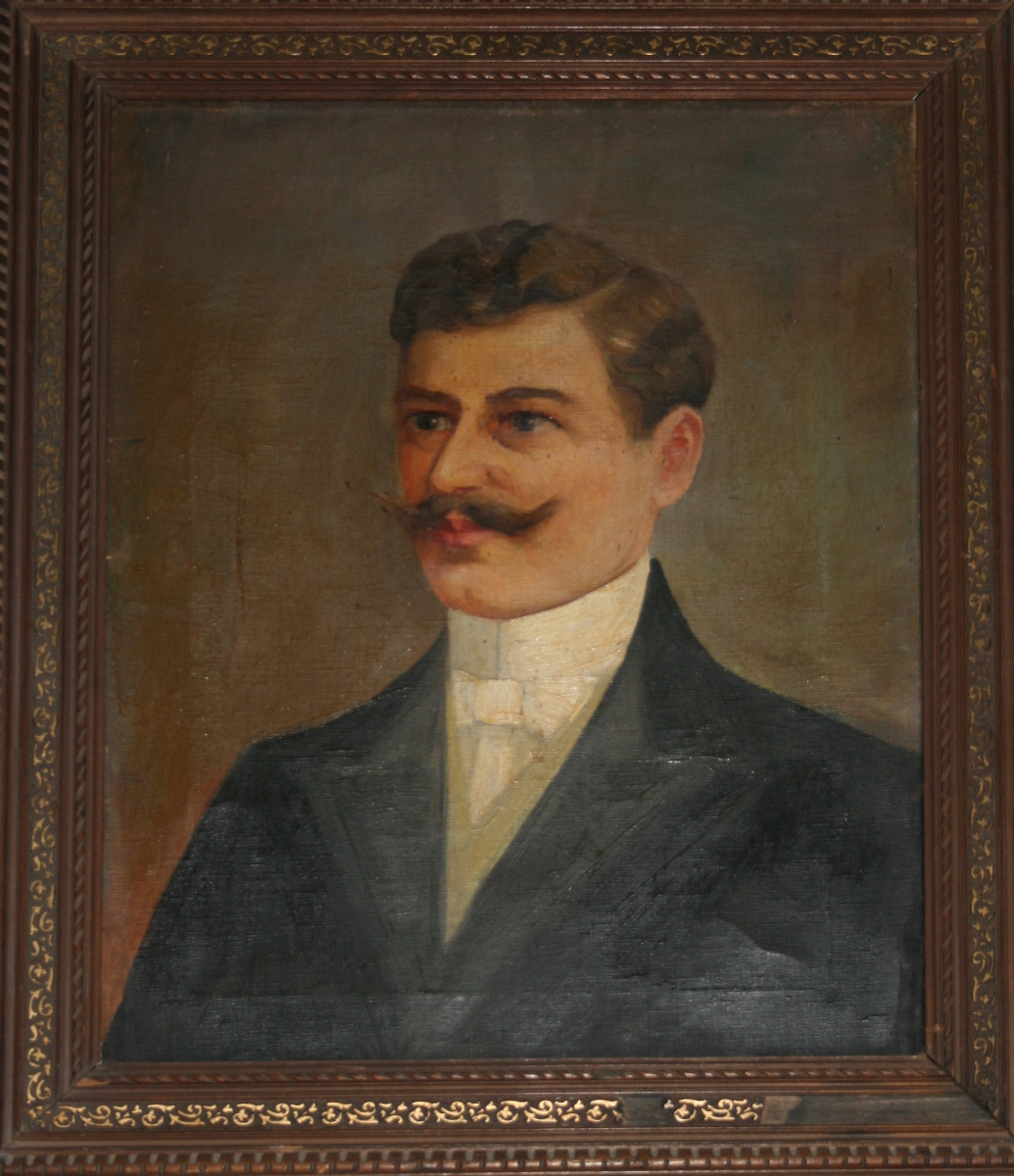
Mirko Seljan

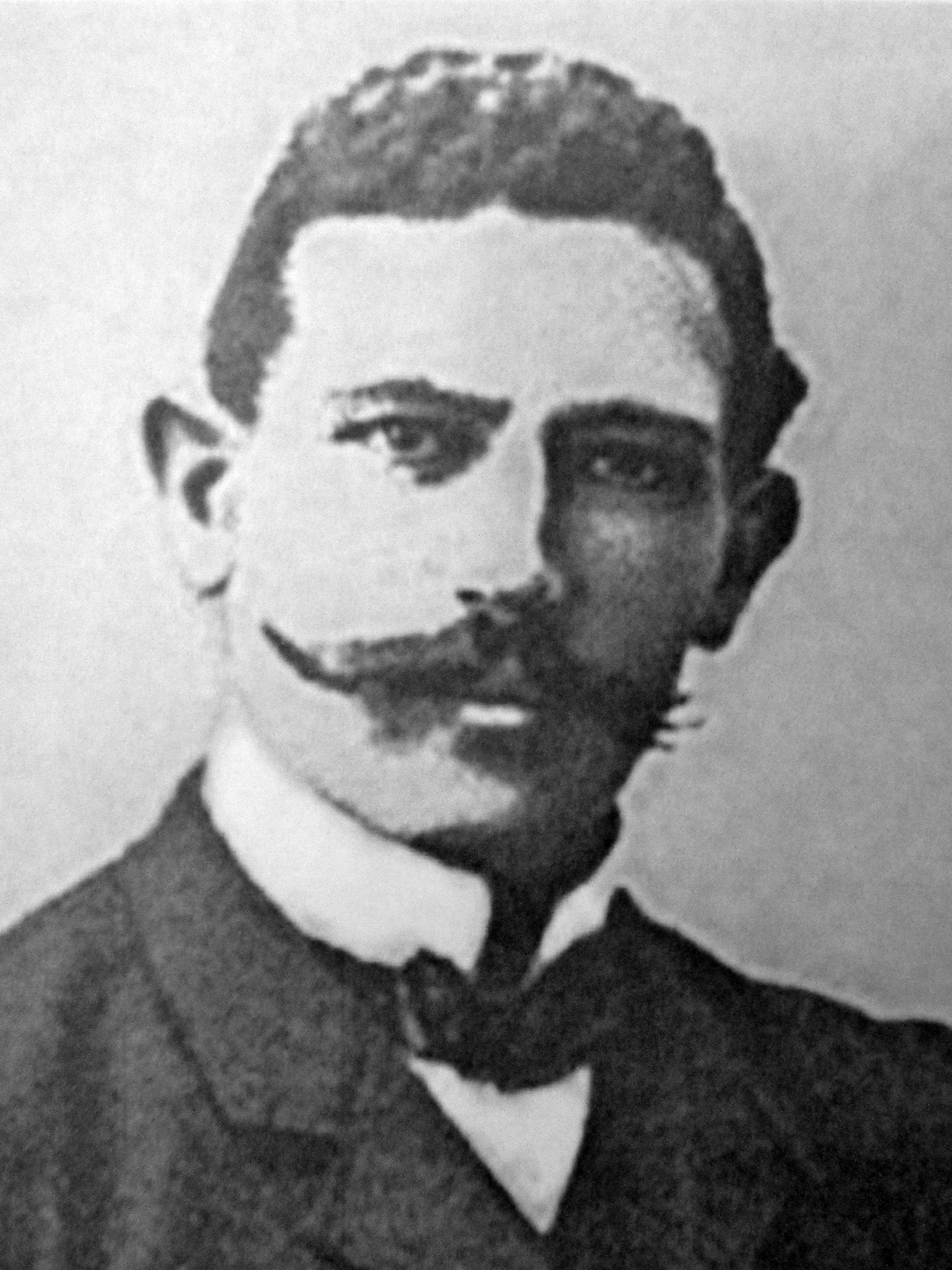
Stjepan Seljan

Mirko Seljan (5 April 1871 – c. 1913) and Stjepan Seljan (19 August 1875 – 7 June 1936) were Croatian explorers.

== Early life ==
The brothers were born in Karlovac, Croatia (at the time part of Austria-Hungary). After receiving a basic education there and attending Gymnasium Karlovac, they started traveling across Europe. Older Mirko was, in 1898, known under the name Champion Globetrotter because he walked the distance between Paris, France and Saint Petersburg in Russia. It is believed that the brothers started their journey after being impressed by the books or lectures by another Croatian explorer, Dragutin Lerman, who was in Africa as leader of Henry Morton Stanley's team.

Stjepan Seljan's birth name was actually Štefan; later in his life he was commonly referred to as Stevo.

== Africa ==
They started in January 1899, leaving Karlovac by foot for Trieste, today in Italy. They visited Alexandria and Cairo, then walked along the river Nile toward Sudan. After returning to Cairo, they headed to Port Said, Djibouti, and Aden, reaching Bab el Mandeb. After traveling to Obock back in Djibouti, they eventually ended up in Harar and Addis Ababa in Ethiopia.

There, on the recommendation of several influential Europeans, Menelik II, Emperor of Ethiopia provided them with an escort of 300 people to continue their expedition to the south. Mirko was appointed governor of the southern province of Ethiopia with his brother Stjepan as his lieutenant-governor. They spent three years defining the border between Ethiopia and Kenya, bringing the tribes under the unified government of Menelik II. Their expedition and military camps near Lake Turkana (Lake Rudolf) were named Seljanville and still appear on maps today.

The greatest benefit of the journey was that they expanded the sovereignty of Ethiopia to the right side of the river Omo. The current borders between the states of Ethiopia, Sudan, and Kenya around Lake Turkana are the same as drafted by the Seljan explorers at that time. In 1902, due to political tension, they left, only to return after the end of hostilities between imperial Britain and France (cf. Fashoda Incident).

They were highly regarded by the emperor Menelik II, and received many gifts, some of which are today in the possession of their families; some others are on display in the Ethnographic Museum in Zagreb. It is obvious today that the journeys of the two explorers were partly influenced or disrupted by world politics. Nonetheless their initial intention was to enrich their lives and the world with new knowledge and understanding of the world.

== South America ==
In April 1903 the two brothers left for Rio de Janeiro in Brazil with the intention of entering areas that were at that time unknown, to establish traveling and trade routes and permanent posts. The government of Brazil was interested in enhancing trading and development going from the east to the west. During 1903, they established the Croatian Scientific Mission (Misión Científica Croata). They made contacts with the Guaraní tribe around the Aguapehu river and intensively mapped the area. At the end of 1903 they were on their way from Salta Grande to Asunción, Paraguay, ending their journey on the Paraná River in Argentina. The expedition is described in the book El Salto del Guayran, published in 1905 in Buenos Aires. In 1905 they left for the waterfalls of Iguaçu and later conducted research for the state of Santa Catarina.

At the beginning of 1905, after crossing the Andes by foot and with mules from Argentina, the Seljans arrived in Chile. In Valparaíso as well in Santiago they planned a new expedition to approach the area of the Amazon River from the south side. Here, they met with Croatian immigrants and established the Sociedad Slava Exploradora de Mato Grosso (Slavic Society for the Exploration of Mato Grosso), which was supposed to provide public relations and support expeditions. In May of the same year, they left for Montevideo, Uruguay with their new friend and new explorer Franjo Pommer. Due to extensive preparations, they started rather late, in 1908, focusing on the Rio Branco and Rio Maracá rivers in the Amazon delta. Exhausted and discouraged by delays in obtaining permits from the government, they returned to Chile hoping to see Peru and Bolivia. They spent 1911 exploring the Atacama desert and the area of Tarapacá. In that year, for the first time, they entered Peru. They established Hrvatsko dioničarsko društvo (Croatian Brokerage Society) with the purpose of helping the government of Peru to plan, finance and build roads connecting two parts of the country, from the Andes to the Amazon basin.

== End ==
The brothers took different paths for the first time in October 1912 with Stjepan heading toward the United States to initiate new business contracts, while Mirko was supposed to continue their research, starting a new expedition. Because his group did not meet another group of explorers to continue with, Mirko decided to proceed on his own deeper into the rainforest around Huayabamba river, not to be seen again. In the aftermath, numerous theories about his disappearance arose, including murder, death from hazards of the jungle, even cannibalism, but none was ever proven. After his older brother's disappearance, Stjepan kept moving, searching for mineral deposits in South and Central America until, in 1917, he decided to settle and made his home in Ouro Preto, Brazil, where he died in 1936.

== Reasons ==
It is obvious today that the journeys of the two explorers were partly influenced or disrupted by world politics and by newly industrialized society. During their travels, they conducted numerous observations and provided documentation later used for works in geomorphology, climatology, and ethnography. Their initial intention was to enrich their lives and the world with new knowledge and understanding. In their diaries, they described the areas they passed through, discussed Indian tribes they met, and left numerous sketches, photographs, maps, data, and memories regarding the nature and cultures that they had so much enjoyed meeting.
