= Great Britons =

British television series

Great Britons is a television series that was broadcast by the BBC in 2002. It was based on a television poll conducted to determine who the British people at that time considered the greatest Britons in history. The series included individual programmes featuring the top ten, with viewers having further opportunity to vote after each programme. It concluded with a debate and final determination of the ranking of the top ten. Although many living people were included among the top 100, all of the top ten were deceased.

== Poll ==
The poll resulted in nominees including Guy Fawkes, who was executed for his alleged role in the supposed plot to blow up the Parliament of England; Oliver Cromwell, who created a republican British state (the Commonwealth of England, Scotland, and Ireland); Richard III, suspected of murdering his nephews; James Connolly, an Irish nationalist and socialist who was executed by the Crown due to his part in the 1916 Easter Rising; Thomas Paine, who wrote against the British crown before and during the American Revolution; John Lydon, the lead vocalist of the Sex Pistols; Enoch Powell, a conservative politician; and actor and singer Michael Crawford, the second-highest-ranked entertainer, after John Lennon. One of the more controversial figures to be included on the list was the occultist Aleister Crowley which Helen Haste saw as an example of British eccentricity.

The poll and advocacy model of the final programme prevented the top ten figures from receiving critical scrutiny and the result was hagiographic. The Controller of BBC Two, Jane Root, said she hoped the list would produce "plenty of debate". However, the resulting television show left many controversies of its subjects unaddressed.

Two Irish nationals, Bono from U2 and Bob Geldof, were included. Sir Ernest Shackleton and Arthur Wellesley, 1st Duke of Wellington, were both Anglo-Irish in what is now the Republic of Ireland when all of Ireland was part of the United Kingdom, and Alexander Fleming in 20th place was Scottish. There are nine Scottish people on the list and thirteen of the 100 are women. Sixty had lived in the 20th century. Only one entry was from the BAME community (Freddie Mercury). Four of the list are Welsh: Owain Glyndŵr, Aneurin Bevan, Richard Burton, David Lloyd George. Two of the list are pre-English (Boudica, King Arthur).

The highest-ranked living person was Margaret Thatcher, placed 16th. Ringo Starr was the only member of the Beatles not on the list. Isambard Kingdom Brunel occupied the top spot in the polls for some time due largely to "students from Brunel University who have been campaigning vigorously for the engineer for weeks." However, a late surge in the final week of voting put Winston Churchill into first place.

== The list ==
Although the BBC's original ranked list has been removed from their web server and what remains is only an alphabetical list of the Top 100, several other sources have preserved the original ranked list.

There was some question as to whether the Richard Burton listed at No. 96 was the actor or the explorer. A BBC press release makes clear that the actor was intended.

=== Top 10 ===
Rank	Name	Notability	Advocate	Ref.
1	Sir Winston Churchill (1874–1965)	Prime Minister (1940–1945, 1951–1955). Historically ranked as one of the greatest British prime ministers. Led the nation during World War II, when the country defended itself against a planned German invasion. He was an important figure in post-war national and international politics. Received the Nobel Prize in Literature in 1953.	Mo Mowlam, British politician.	
2	Isambard Kingdom Brunel (1806–1859)	Mechanical and civil engineer, designer of the Great Western Railway, Clifton Suspension Bridge, SS Great Britain and numerous significant ships, tunnels and bridges. A prominent figure during the Industrial Revolution which began in Britain, he revolutionised public transport and modern engineering.	Jeremy Clarkson, TV presenter.	
3	Diana, Princess of Wales (1961–1997)	First wife of Charles III (marriage 1981–1996), and mother of William, Prince of Wales, and Prince Harry, Duke of Sussex. Admired for her philanthropic deeds and fashion style.	Rosie Boycott, journalist and feminist activist.	
4	Charles Darwin (1809–1882)	Biologist, geologist and naturalist. Originator of the theory of evolution through natural selection and author of On the Origin of Species.	Andrew Marr, journalist and TV presenter.	
5	William Shakespeare (1564–1616)	Poet and playwright. Creator of Hamlet, Macbeth, Romeo and Juliet, and many more. Thought of by many as the greatest of all English-language writers. An influential figure in theatre, his plays have been performed more often than those of any other playwright. His work is praised for its humanity, diversity, psychological depth and countless new words and expressions which have become part of the English language.	Fiona Shaw, actress and theatre and opera director.	
6	Sir Isaac Newton (1642–1727)	Physicist, mathematician, astronomer, theologian and natural philosopher. Originator of universal gravitation and laws of classical mechanics and laws of motion. His Principia is one of the most influential works in the history of science.	Tristram Hunt, historian.	
7	Elizabeth I (1533–1603)	Queen of England and Ireland (1558–1603). Brought a period of relative internal stability, and led England to victory over the Spanish Armada during the Anglo-Spanish War. Her reign is known as the Elizabethan era.	Michael Portillo, journalist and politician.	
8	John Lennon (1940–1980)	Pop/rock singer-songwriter, musician, activist and member of music group The Beatles. One of the most famous, successful, influential, covered and admired pop artists of all time. Hailed for his highly personal and experimental music, rebellious free-spirited attitude and peace activism.	Alan Davies, comedian and actor.	
9	Horatio Nelson (1758–1805)	Naval commander, famous for his service in the Royal Navy, particularly during the Napoleonic Wars. His victory during the Battle of Trafalgar was significant in preventing Napoleon's planned invasion of the United Kingdom.	Lucy Moore, historian.	
10	Oliver Cromwell (1599–1658)	1st Lord Protector of the Commonwealth of England, Scotland and Ireland (1653–1658). Served as the commander of the New Model Army during the First and Second English Civil Wars against King Charles I.	Richard Holmes, military historian.	

== See also ==
- Greatest Britons, an awards show on ITV in 2007
- Greatest Britons spin-offs
- Historical rankings of prime ministers of the United Kingdom
- 100 Great Black Britons
