= List of minor planets: 432001–433000 =

The following is a partial list of minor planets, running from minor-planet number 432001 through 433000, inclusive. The primary data for this and other partial lists is based on JPL's "Small-Body Orbital Elements" and data available from the Minor Planet Center. Critical list information is also provided by the MPC, unless otherwise specified from Lowell Observatory. A detailed description of the table's columns and additional sources are given on the main page including a complete list of every page in this series, and a statistical break-up on the dynamical classification of minor planets.

Also see the summary list of all named bodies in numerical and alphabetical order, and the corresponding naming citations for the number range of this particular list. New namings may only be added to this list after official publication, as the preannouncement of names is condemned by the Working Group for Small Bodies Nomenclature of the International Astronomical Union.

Near-Earth obj.	MBA (inner)	MBA (outer)	Centaur
Mars-crosser	MBA (middle)	Jupiter trojan	Trans-Neptunian obj.
Unclassified

== 432001–432100 ==
Designation			Discovery			Properties		Ref
Permanent	Provisional	Named after	Date	Site	Discoverer(s)	Category	Diam.	Ref
432001	2008 UA_{323}	—	October 31, 2008	Mount Lemmon	Mount Lemmon Survey	·	2.3 km	MPC · JPL
432002	2008 UE_{323}	—	October 23, 2008	Kitt Peak	Spacewatch	·	1.5 km	MPC · JPL
432003	2008 UC_{326}	—	October 31, 2008	Mount Lemmon	Mount Lemmon Survey	H	590 m	MPC · JPL
432004	2008 UO_{337}	—	October 23, 2008	Kitt Peak	Spacewatch	EOS	2.3 km	MPC · JPL
432005	2008 UW_{341}	—	October 27, 2008	Mount Lemmon	Mount Lemmon Survey	·	1.6 km	MPC · JPL
432006	2008 UV_{342}	—	October 30, 2008	Kitt Peak	Spacewatch	AST	1.6 km	MPC · JPL
432007	2008 UZ_{342}	—	October 31, 2008	Catalina	CSS	·	2.2 km	MPC · JPL
432008	2008 UM_{348}	—	October 24, 2008	Kitt Peak	Spacewatch	NEM	2.3 km	MPC · JPL
432009	2008 UR_{352}	—	October 24, 2008	Mount Lemmon	Mount Lemmon Survey	·	3.0 km	MPC · JPL
432010	2008 UQ_{356}	—	October 23, 2008	Kitt Peak	Spacewatch	·	1.4 km	MPC · JPL
432011	2008 UC_{357}	—	October 24, 2008	Catalina	CSS	·	1.9 km	MPC · JPL
432012	2008 UY_{360}	—	October 7, 2008	Mount Lemmon	Mount Lemmon Survey	EUN	1.5 km	MPC · JPL
432013	2008 UL_{366}	—	October 20, 2008	Kitt Peak	Spacewatch	(12739)	1.8 km	MPC · JPL
432014	2008 VE_{2}	—	October 22, 2008	Kitt Peak	Spacewatch	·	2.4 km	MPC · JPL
432015	2008 VH_{5}	—	November 1, 2008	Kitt Peak	Spacewatch	·	2.1 km	MPC · JPL
432016	2008 VK_{7}	—	September 6, 2008	Catalina	CSS	·	2.2 km	MPC · JPL
432017	2008 VU_{9}	—	November 2, 2008	Kitt Peak	Spacewatch	·	1.7 km	MPC · JPL
432018	2008 VT_{18}	—	November 1, 2008	Kitt Peak	Spacewatch	·	1.8 km	MPC · JPL
432019	2008 VN_{33}	—	November 2, 2008	Mount Lemmon	Mount Lemmon Survey	·	2.3 km	MPC · JPL
432020	2008 VH_{34}	—	November 2, 2008	Mount Lemmon	Mount Lemmon Survey	AGN	1.2 km	MPC · JPL
432021	2008 VT_{48}	—	October 26, 2008	Kitt Peak	Spacewatch	·	2.4 km	MPC · JPL
432022	2008 VV_{49}	—	November 4, 2008	Kitt Peak	Spacewatch	·	2.0 km	MPC · JPL
432023	2008 VB_{52}	—	September 29, 2008	Kitt Peak	Spacewatch	NEM	2.1 km	MPC · JPL
432024	2008 VU_{72}	—	November 1, 2008	Mount Lemmon	Mount Lemmon Survey	·	1.8 km	MPC · JPL
432025	2008 WA_{5}	—	November 17, 2008	Kitt Peak	Spacewatch	ADE	2.6 km	MPC · JPL
432026	2008 WE_{21}	—	October 23, 2008	Mount Lemmon	Mount Lemmon Survey	·	1.9 km	MPC · JPL
432027	2008 WB_{35}	—	October 21, 2008	Kitt Peak	Spacewatch	·	1.7 km	MPC · JPL
432028	2008 WY_{37}	—	November 17, 2008	Kitt Peak	Spacewatch	·	1.8 km	MPC · JPL
432029	2008 WC_{41}	—	November 17, 2008	Kitt Peak	Spacewatch	·	1.5 km	MPC · JPL
432030	2008 WJ_{41}	—	October 24, 2008	Kitt Peak	Spacewatch	KOR	1.3 km	MPC · JPL
432031	2008 WJ_{42}	—	September 28, 2008	Mount Lemmon	Mount Lemmon Survey	KOR	1.3 km	MPC · JPL
432032	2008 WS_{46}	—	November 17, 2008	Kitt Peak	Spacewatch	·	2.4 km	MPC · JPL
432033	2008 WW_{48}	—	November 18, 2008	Catalina	CSS	·	2.2 km	MPC · JPL
432034	2008 WN_{59}	—	September 24, 2008	Kitt Peak	Spacewatch	·	2.2 km	MPC · JPL
432035	2008 WX_{59}	—	November 18, 2008	Socorro	LINEAR	·	3.0 km	MPC · JPL
432036	2008 WR_{61}	—	October 29, 2008	Kitt Peak	Spacewatch	·	2.1 km	MPC · JPL
432037	2008 WS_{63}	—	September 29, 2008	Catalina	CSS	·	2.7 km	MPC · JPL
432038	2008 WK_{71}	—	November 19, 2008	Kitt Peak	Spacewatch	KOR	1.1 km	MPC · JPL
432039	2008 WN_{74}	—	November 20, 2008	Kitt Peak	Spacewatch	·	1.8 km	MPC · JPL
432040	2008 WW_{84}	—	November 20, 2008	Kitt Peak	Spacewatch	BRA	1.7 km	MPC · JPL
432041	2008 WE_{99}	—	November 24, 2008	Kitt Peak	Spacewatch	H	550 m	MPC · JPL
432042	2008 WD_{103}	—	November 27, 2008	La Sagra	OAM	·	2.8 km	MPC · JPL
432043	2008 WS_{113}	—	November 30, 2008	Kitt Peak	Spacewatch	HOF	2.3 km	MPC · JPL
432044	2008 WT_{114}	—	November 30, 2008	Kitt Peak	Spacewatch	·	1.5 km	MPC · JPL
432045	2008 WY_{115}	—	November 30, 2008	Kitt Peak	Spacewatch	·	1.8 km	MPC · JPL
432046	2008 WZ_{119}	—	November 30, 2008	Mount Lemmon	Mount Lemmon Survey	·	1.9 km	MPC · JPL
432047	2008 WY_{138}	—	November 24, 2008	Socorro	LINEAR	·	4.9 km	MPC · JPL
432048	2008 XN_{21}	—	November 23, 2008	Kitt Peak	Spacewatch	·	3.1 km	MPC · JPL
432049	2008 XS_{36}	—	November 19, 2008	Kitt Peak	Spacewatch	·	2.0 km	MPC · JPL
432050	2008 XA_{37}	—	December 2, 2008	Kitt Peak	Spacewatch	KOR	1.2 km	MPC · JPL
432051	2008 XG_{49}	—	December 7, 2008	Mount Lemmon	Mount Lemmon Survey	·	3.4 km	MPC · JPL
432052	2008 XF_{50}	—	December 3, 2008	Mount Lemmon	Mount Lemmon Survey	·	4.1 km	MPC · JPL
432053	2008 YY	—	November 22, 2008	Mount Lemmon	Mount Lemmon Survey	·	2.5 km	MPC · JPL
432054	2008 YL_{17}	—	December 21, 2008	Mount Lemmon	Mount Lemmon Survey	·	3.6 km	MPC · JPL
432055	2008 YU_{17}	—	December 21, 2008	Mount Lemmon	Mount Lemmon Survey	THM	1.9 km	MPC · JPL
432056	2008 YM_{21}	—	December 21, 2008	Mount Lemmon	Mount Lemmon Survey	·	2.5 km	MPC · JPL
432057	2008 YQ_{21}	—	December 21, 2008	Mount Lemmon	Mount Lemmon Survey	·	3.4 km	MPC · JPL
432058	2008 YT_{22}	—	December 21, 2008	Mount Lemmon	Mount Lemmon Survey	·	4.8 km	MPC · JPL
432059	2008 YA_{23}	—	December 21, 2008	Kitt Peak	Spacewatch	·	2.1 km	MPC · JPL
432060	2008 YE_{32}	—	December 31, 2008	Calvin-Rehoboth	L. A. Molnar	H	550 m	MPC · JPL
432061	2008 YP_{43}	—	November 18, 2008	Kitt Peak	Spacewatch	·	1.7 km	MPC · JPL
432062	2008 YA_{52}	—	December 29, 2008	Mount Lemmon	Mount Lemmon Survey	·	1.9 km	MPC · JPL
432063	2008 YA_{68}	—	December 30, 2008	Mount Lemmon	Mount Lemmon Survey	·	2.2 km	MPC · JPL
432064	2008 YK_{70}	—	December 29, 2008	Mount Lemmon	Mount Lemmon Survey	·	4.1 km	MPC · JPL
432065	2008 YB_{71}	—	December 29, 2008	Mount Lemmon	Mount Lemmon Survey	·	2.2 km	MPC · JPL
432066	2008 YB_{88}	—	November 30, 2008	Mount Lemmon	Mount Lemmon Survey	·	2.7 km	MPC · JPL
432067	2008 YU_{94}	—	December 29, 2008	Kitt Peak	Spacewatch	·	3.6 km	MPC · JPL
432068	2008 YP_{95}	—	December 29, 2008	Kitt Peak	Spacewatch	THM	1.9 km	MPC · JPL
432069	2008 YU_{96}	—	December 29, 2008	Mount Lemmon	Mount Lemmon Survey	·	3.1 km	MPC · JPL
432070	2008 YA_{100}	—	December 21, 2008	Mount Lemmon	Mount Lemmon Survey	VER	2.6 km	MPC · JPL
432071	2008 YG_{103}	—	December 29, 2008	Kitt Peak	Spacewatch	·	2.1 km	MPC · JPL
432072	2008 YJ_{105}	—	December 29, 2008	Kitt Peak	Spacewatch	·	2.9 km	MPC · JPL
432073	2008 YS_{108}	—	November 23, 2008	Mount Lemmon	Mount Lemmon Survey	·	2.8 km	MPC · JPL
432074	2008 YP_{112}	—	December 31, 2008	Kitt Peak	Spacewatch	·	1.7 km	MPC · JPL
432075	2008 YP_{122}	—	December 30, 2008	Kitt Peak	Spacewatch	·	4.4 km	MPC · JPL
432076	2008 YF_{123}	—	December 4, 2008	Mount Lemmon	Mount Lemmon Survey	·	2.1 km	MPC · JPL
432077	2008 YV_{126}	—	December 30, 2008	Kitt Peak	Spacewatch	·	3.3 km	MPC · JPL
432078	2008 YR_{127}	—	December 30, 2008	Kitt Peak	Spacewatch	THM	1.8 km	MPC · JPL
432079	2008 YS_{127}	—	December 30, 2008	Kitt Peak	Spacewatch	·	1.6 km	MPC · JPL
432080	2008 YD_{138}	—	December 7, 2008	Mount Lemmon	Mount Lemmon Survey	·	3.2 km	MPC · JPL
432081	2008 YD_{141}	—	December 30, 2008	Mount Lemmon	Mount Lemmon Survey	EOS	1.7 km	MPC · JPL
432082	2008 YW_{141}	—	December 22, 2008	Kitt Peak	Spacewatch	·	3.1 km	MPC · JPL
432083	2008 YL_{142}	—	December 30, 2008	Kitt Peak	Spacewatch	·	1.5 km	MPC · JPL
432084	2008 YU_{142}	—	November 21, 2008	Mount Lemmon	Mount Lemmon Survey	·	2.2 km	MPC · JPL
432085	2008 YK_{144}	—	September 12, 2007	Mount Lemmon	Mount Lemmon Survey	THM	2.0 km	MPC · JPL
432086	2008 YP_{151}	—	December 22, 2008	Mount Lemmon	Mount Lemmon Survey	·	4.5 km	MPC · JPL
432087	2008 YV_{151}	—	December 22, 2008	Mount Lemmon	Mount Lemmon Survey	LIX	3.8 km	MPC · JPL
432088	2008 YU_{152}	—	December 30, 2008	Kitt Peak	Spacewatch	·	2.6 km	MPC · JPL
432089	2008 YK_{154}	—	December 22, 2008	Mount Lemmon	Mount Lemmon Survey	·	4.3 km	MPC · JPL
432090	2008 YN_{154}	—	December 22, 2008	Kitt Peak	Spacewatch	EOS	1.7 km	MPC · JPL
432091	2008 YV_{155}	—	December 22, 2008	Kitt Peak	Spacewatch	EOS	1.6 km	MPC · JPL
432092	2008 YY_{157}	—	December 30, 2008	Catalina	CSS	·	3.5 km	MPC · JPL
432093	2008 YP_{158}	—	December 30, 2008	Mount Lemmon	Mount Lemmon Survey	·	2.8 km	MPC · JPL
432094	2008 YV_{165}	—	December 31, 2008	Mount Lemmon	Mount Lemmon Survey	·	3.3 km	MPC · JPL
432095	2008 YU_{167}	—	December 22, 2008	Kitt Peak	Spacewatch	·	3.5 km	MPC · JPL
432096	2008 YL_{168}	—	December 31, 2008	Catalina	CSS	·	2.3 km	MPC · JPL
432097	2008 YA_{170}	—	December 22, 2008	Kitt Peak	Spacewatch	·	2.2 km	MPC · JPL
432098	2009 AM_{11}	—	December 22, 2008	Kitt Peak	Spacewatch	·	1.9 km	MPC · JPL
432099	2009 AT_{20}	—	January 2, 2009	Mount Lemmon	Mount Lemmon Survey	·	2.5 km	MPC · JPL
432100	2009 AM_{22}	—	January 3, 2009	Kitt Peak	Spacewatch	·	1.7 km	MPC · JPL

== 432101–432200 ==
back to top

Designation			Discovery			Properties		Ref
Permanent	Provisional	Named after	Date	Site	Discoverer(s)	Category	Diam.	Ref
432101 Ngari	2009 AZ_{28}	Ngari	January 14, 2009	Lulin	Q. Ye, Lin, H.-C.	·	3.6 km	MPC · JPL
432102	2009 AN_{32}	—	January 15, 2009	Kitt Peak	Spacewatch	·	2.2 km	MPC · JPL
432103	2009 AB_{34}	—	January 15, 2009	Kitt Peak	Spacewatch	·	2.8 km	MPC · JPL
432104	2009 AL_{36}	—	January 15, 2009	Kitt Peak	Spacewatch	·	3.4 km	MPC · JPL
432105	2009 AG_{40}	—	January 15, 2009	Kitt Peak	Spacewatch	·	3.2 km	MPC · JPL
432106	2009 AP_{40}	—	November 24, 2008	Mount Lemmon	Mount Lemmon Survey	VER	2.6 km	MPC · JPL
432107 Reedspurling	2009 AY_{40}	Reedspurling	January 15, 2009	Kitt Peak	Spacewatch	·	2.7 km	MPC · JPL
432108	2009 AS_{47}	—	January 8, 2009	Kitt Peak	Spacewatch	·	2.1 km	MPC · JPL
432109	2009 AJ_{48}	—	January 2, 2009	Catalina	CSS	·	2.4 km	MPC · JPL
432110	2009 BL_{3}	—	January 18, 2009	Socorro	LINEAR	·	2.6 km	MPC · JPL
432111	2009 BL_{4}	—	January 18, 2009	Catalina	CSS	·	2.5 km	MPC · JPL
432112	2009 BH_{5}	—	January 17, 2009	Dauban	Kugel, F.	EOS	1.7 km	MPC · JPL
432113	2009 BY_{10}	—	January 25, 2009	Mayhill	Lowe, A.	LIX	4.1 km	MPC · JPL
432114	2009 BT_{11}	—	January 20, 2009	Socorro	LINEAR	·	2.9 km	MPC · JPL
432115	2009 BO_{15}	—	December 21, 2008	Kitt Peak	Spacewatch	·	2.4 km	MPC · JPL
432116	2009 BG_{18}	—	January 16, 2009	Mount Lemmon	Mount Lemmon Survey	·	2.0 km	MPC · JPL
432117	2009 BZ_{19}	—	January 16, 2009	Mount Lemmon	Mount Lemmon Survey	·	1.5 km	MPC · JPL
432118	2009 BF_{23}	—	January 17, 2009	Kitt Peak	Spacewatch	·	2.1 km	MPC · JPL
432119	2009 BC_{24}	—	January 17, 2009	Kitt Peak	Spacewatch	EOS	1.9 km	MPC · JPL
432120	2009 BS_{29}	—	January 16, 2009	Kitt Peak	Spacewatch	·	3.1 km	MPC · JPL
432121	2009 BX_{30}	—	January 2, 2009	Mount Lemmon	Mount Lemmon Survey	·	3.2 km	MPC · JPL
432122	2009 BF_{32}	—	January 2, 2009	Kitt Peak	Spacewatch	·	2.2 km	MPC · JPL
432123	2009 BV_{34}	—	January 16, 2009	Kitt Peak	Spacewatch	·	2.5 km	MPC · JPL
432124	2009 BX_{34}	—	January 16, 2009	Kitt Peak	Spacewatch	·	2.7 km	MPC · JPL
432125	2009 BG_{37}	—	January 16, 2009	Kitt Peak	Spacewatch	·	2.7 km	MPC · JPL
432126	2009 BY_{42}	—	January 16, 2009	Kitt Peak	Spacewatch	·	3.4 km	MPC · JPL
432127	2009 BY_{45}	—	November 23, 2008	Mount Lemmon	Mount Lemmon Survey	·	4.1 km	MPC · JPL
432128	2009 BZ_{46}	—	January 16, 2009	Kitt Peak	Spacewatch	·	2.4 km	MPC · JPL
432129	2009 BS_{47}	—	January 16, 2009	Mount Lemmon	Mount Lemmon Survey	·	2.1 km	MPC · JPL
432130	2009 BZ_{48}	—	January 16, 2009	Mount Lemmon	Mount Lemmon Survey	THM	1.8 km	MPC · JPL
432131	2009 BX_{52}	—	January 16, 2009	Mount Lemmon	Mount Lemmon Survey	·	3.0 km	MPC · JPL
432132	2009 BQ_{53}	—	January 16, 2009	Mount Lemmon	Mount Lemmon Survey	·	2.1 km	MPC · JPL
432133	2009 BX_{55}	—	January 17, 2009	Mount Lemmon	Mount Lemmon Survey	THM	1.6 km	MPC · JPL
432134	2009 BH_{61}	—	January 18, 2009	Mount Lemmon	Mount Lemmon Survey	HYG	2.2 km	MPC · JPL
432135	2009 BZ_{63}	—	January 20, 2009	Catalina	CSS	·	2.2 km	MPC · JPL
432136	2009 BH_{69}	—	January 25, 2009	Catalina	CSS	·	2.7 km	MPC · JPL
432137	2009 BY_{77}	—	January 25, 2009	Socorro	LINEAR	·	3.2 km	MPC · JPL
432138	2009 BT_{82}	—	January 20, 2009	Catalina	CSS	·	2.9 km	MPC · JPL
432139	2009 BL_{84}	—	October 24, 2008	Mount Lemmon	Mount Lemmon Survey	·	2.9 km	MPC · JPL
432140	2009 BP_{84}	—	January 25, 2009	Kitt Peak	Spacewatch	·	2.2 km	MPC · JPL
432141	2009 BF_{85}	—	December 30, 2008	Mount Lemmon	Mount Lemmon Survey	·	1.8 km	MPC · JPL
432142	2009 BW_{87}	—	January 25, 2009	Kitt Peak	Spacewatch	THM	2.1 km	MPC · JPL
432143	2009 BP_{90}	—	January 15, 2009	Kitt Peak	Spacewatch	·	2.2 km	MPC · JPL
432144	2009 BJ_{94}	—	January 25, 2009	Kitt Peak	Spacewatch	·	3.2 km	MPC · JPL
432145	2009 BX_{97}	—	January 26, 2009	Mount Lemmon	Mount Lemmon Survey	·	2.5 km	MPC · JPL
432146	2009 BY_{100}	—	December 22, 2008	Kitt Peak	Spacewatch	EOS	1.7 km	MPC · JPL
432147	2009 BF_{104}	—	January 17, 2009	Kitt Peak	Spacewatch	·	3.2 km	MPC · JPL
432148	2009 BG_{104}	—	January 16, 2009	Kitt Peak	Spacewatch	·	3.0 km	MPC · JPL
432149	2009 BJ_{106}	—	January 25, 2009	Kitt Peak	Spacewatch	·	2.1 km	MPC · JPL
432150	2009 BE_{132}	—	January 30, 2009	Mount Lemmon	Mount Lemmon Survey	EOS	1.7 km	MPC · JPL
432151	2009 BN_{133}	—	January 29, 2009	Kitt Peak	Spacewatch	·	2.4 km	MPC · JPL
432152	2009 BV_{136}	—	January 16, 2009	Mount Lemmon	Mount Lemmon Survey	·	2.8 km	MPC · JPL
432153	2009 BS_{139}	—	January 29, 2009	Kitt Peak	Spacewatch	·	2.2 km	MPC · JPL
432154	2009 BO_{143}	—	January 30, 2009	Kitt Peak	Spacewatch	(3460)	1.8 km	MPC · JPL
432155	2009 BV_{143}	—	January 30, 2009	Kitt Peak	Spacewatch	·	2.2 km	MPC · JPL
432156	2009 BO_{144}	—	January 30, 2009	Kitt Peak	Spacewatch	·	4.3 km	MPC · JPL
432157	2009 BT_{144}	—	January 16, 2009	Kitt Peak	Spacewatch	EOS	1.9 km	MPC · JPL
432158	2009 BO_{147}	—	November 23, 2008	Mount Lemmon	Mount Lemmon Survey	·	4.1 km	MPC · JPL
432159	2009 BB_{148}	—	January 30, 2009	Mount Lemmon	Mount Lemmon Survey	·	2.6 km	MPC · JPL
432160	2009 BS_{153}	—	January 31, 2009	Kitt Peak	Spacewatch	THM	2.0 km	MPC · JPL
432161	2009 BQ_{156}	—	January 31, 2009	Kitt Peak	Spacewatch	·	2.8 km	MPC · JPL
432162	2009 BM_{159}	—	January 31, 2009	Kitt Peak	Spacewatch	·	3.2 km	MPC · JPL
432163	2009 BQ_{162}	—	December 22, 2008	Kitt Peak	Spacewatch	·	2.6 km	MPC · JPL
432164	2009 BM_{170}	—	January 16, 2009	Kitt Peak	Spacewatch	·	3.9 km	MPC · JPL
432165	2009 BK_{171}	—	January 17, 2009	Kitt Peak	Spacewatch	THM	2.0 km	MPC · JPL
432166	2009 BA_{172}	—	January 18, 2009	Kitt Peak	Spacewatch	·	4.1 km	MPC · JPL
432167	2009 BS_{174}	—	January 25, 2009	Kitt Peak	Spacewatch	·	2.7 km	MPC · JPL
432168	2009 BT_{179}	—	January 18, 2009	Mount Lemmon	Mount Lemmon Survey	·	1.9 km	MPC · JPL
432169	2009 BV_{180}	—	January 29, 2009	Kitt Peak	Spacewatch	·	2.4 km	MPC · JPL
432170	2009 BJ_{185}	—	January 17, 2009	Mount Lemmon	Mount Lemmon Survey	(8737)	3.2 km	MPC · JPL
432171	2009 BG_{189}	—	January 16, 2009	Kitt Peak	Spacewatch	·	2.7 km	MPC · JPL
432172	2009 CF_{9}	—	December 22, 2008	Kitt Peak	Spacewatch	EOS	2.1 km	MPC · JPL
432173	2009 CO_{14}	—	February 1, 2009	Kitt Peak	Spacewatch	·	2.7 km	MPC · JPL
432174	2009 CS_{15}	—	January 20, 2009	Mount Lemmon	Mount Lemmon Survey	·	3.1 km	MPC · JPL
432175	2009 CF_{21}	—	February 1, 2009	Kitt Peak	Spacewatch	·	3.2 km	MPC · JPL
432176	2009 CJ_{34}	—	February 2, 2009	Mount Lemmon	Mount Lemmon Survey	LIX	3.8 km	MPC · JPL
432177	2009 CU_{35}	—	February 2, 2009	Mount Lemmon	Mount Lemmon Survey	·	470 m	MPC · JPL
432178	2009 CC_{36}	—	February 2, 2009	Mount Lemmon	Mount Lemmon Survey	·	2.8 km	MPC · JPL
432179	2009 CO_{38}	—	January 15, 2009	Kitt Peak	Spacewatch	·	2.4 km	MPC · JPL
432180	2009 CV_{44}	—	December 31, 2008	Mount Lemmon	Mount Lemmon Survey	·	2.8 km	MPC · JPL
432181	2009 CY_{52}	—	February 14, 2009	Mount Lemmon	Mount Lemmon Survey	·	2.8 km	MPC · JPL
432182	2009 CZ_{53}	—	January 16, 2009	Kitt Peak	Spacewatch	·	2.6 km	MPC · JPL
432183	2009 CR_{57}	—	February 2, 2009	Kitt Peak	Spacewatch	EOS	2.3 km	MPC · JPL
432184	2009 DR	—	January 31, 2009	Mount Lemmon	Mount Lemmon Survey	·	2.1 km	MPC · JPL
432185	2009 DT	—	February 18, 2009	Mayhill	Lowe, A.	·	3.0 km	MPC · JPL
432186	2009 DH_{4}	—	February 20, 2009	Pla D'Arguines	R. Ferrando	·	3.1 km	MPC · JPL
432187	2009 DH_{6}	—	February 17, 2009	Kitt Peak	Spacewatch	·	2.0 km	MPC · JPL
432188	2009 DJ_{6}	—	February 17, 2009	Kitt Peak	Spacewatch	LIX	4.3 km	MPC · JPL
432189	2009 DB_{7}	—	February 19, 2009	Mount Lemmon	Mount Lemmon Survey	·	1.9 km	MPC · JPL
432190	2009 DA_{21}	—	February 19, 2009	Kitt Peak	Spacewatch	·	2.3 km	MPC · JPL
432191	2009 DL_{35}	—	February 20, 2009	Kitt Peak	Spacewatch	·	2.9 km	MPC · JPL
432192	2009 DW_{44}	—	December 30, 2008	Mount Lemmon	Mount Lemmon Survey	THB	3.2 km	MPC · JPL
432193	2009 DN_{65}	—	February 22, 2009	Catalina	CSS	·	4.0 km	MPC · JPL
432194	2009 DX_{67}	—	February 21, 2009	Mount Lemmon	Mount Lemmon Survey	·	2.0 km	MPC · JPL
432195	2009 DF_{68}	—	December 22, 2008	Kitt Peak	Spacewatch	HYG	2.1 km	MPC · JPL
432196	2009 DO_{68}	—	February 21, 2009	Mount Lemmon	Mount Lemmon Survey	·	3.4 km	MPC · JPL
432197	2009 DL_{70}	—	January 25, 2009	Kitt Peak	Spacewatch	·	2.9 km	MPC · JPL
432198	2009 DS_{75}	—	January 30, 2009	Kitt Peak	Spacewatch	·	2.5 km	MPC · JPL
432199	2009 DF_{76}	—	December 30, 2008	Mount Lemmon	Mount Lemmon Survey	VER	2.9 km	MPC · JPL
432200	2009 DQ_{78}	—	February 21, 2009	Kitt Peak	Spacewatch	·	2.5 km	MPC · JPL

== 432201–432300 ==
back to top

Designation			Discovery			Properties		Ref
Permanent	Provisional	Named after	Date	Site	Discoverer(s)	Category	Diam.	Ref
432201	2009 DE_{85}	—	February 27, 2009	Kitt Peak	Spacewatch	·	2.9 km	MPC · JPL
432202	2009 DX_{88}	—	February 3, 2009	Mount Lemmon	Mount Lemmon Survey	·	2.7 km	MPC · JPL
432203	2009 DT_{94}	—	February 28, 2009	Mount Lemmon	Mount Lemmon Survey	·	2.7 km	MPC · JPL
432204	2009 DB_{96}	—	February 25, 2009	Catalina	CSS	(43176)	3.3 km	MPC · JPL
432205	2009 DQ_{104}	—	February 26, 2009	Kitt Peak	Spacewatch	·	3.1 km	MPC · JPL
432206	2009 DR_{107}	—	February 23, 2009	La Sagra	OAM	LIX	3.6 km	MPC · JPL
432207	2009 DX_{129}	—	February 27, 2009	Kitt Peak	Spacewatch	·	3.0 km	MPC · JPL
432208	2009 DS_{135}	—	February 26, 2009	Cerro Burek	Burek, Cerro	·	5.5 km	MPC · JPL
432209	2009 EW_{9}	—	February 3, 2009	Kitt Peak	Spacewatch	·	3.6 km	MPC · JPL
432210	2009 EK_{12}	—	March 1, 2009	Kitt Peak	Spacewatch	HYG	3.2 km	MPC · JPL
432211	2009 EF_{15}	—	February 5, 2009	Kitt Peak	Spacewatch	·	2.8 km	MPC · JPL
432212	2009 FD_{7}	—	February 19, 2009	Kitt Peak	Spacewatch	·	3.0 km	MPC · JPL
432213	2009 FR_{8}	—	March 1, 2009	Kitt Peak	Spacewatch	·	3.1 km	MPC · JPL
432214	2009 FR_{15}	—	February 19, 2009	Mount Lemmon	Mount Lemmon Survey	·	2.6 km	MPC · JPL
432215	2009 FE_{28}	—	March 22, 2009	Catalina	CSS	·	3.2 km	MPC · JPL
432216	2009 FF_{38}	—	February 5, 2009	Kitt Peak	Spacewatch	·	3.3 km	MPC · JPL
432217	2009 FJ_{40}	—	March 18, 2009	Catalina	CSS	·	3.4 km	MPC · JPL
432218	2009 FN_{41}	—	March 22, 2009	La Sagra	OAM	·	3.7 km	MPC · JPL
432219	2009 FV_{45}	—	February 24, 2009	Kitt Peak	Spacewatch	·	2.6 km	MPC · JPL
432220	2009 FS_{53}	—	February 20, 2009	Kitt Peak	Spacewatch	·	2.8 km	MPC · JPL
432221	2009 FB_{54}	—	March 21, 2009	Kitt Peak	Spacewatch	·	2.9 km	MPC · JPL
432222	2009 FW_{76}	—	March 16, 2009	Kitt Peak	Spacewatch	·	3.6 km	MPC · JPL
432223	2009 FG_{78}	—	April 16, 2004	Socorro	LINEAR	·	3.4 km	MPC · JPL
432224	2009 FJ_{78}	—	September 25, 1995	Kitt Peak	Spacewatch	·	3.3 km	MPC · JPL
432225	2009 FQ_{78}	—	February 26, 2009	Catalina	CSS	T_{j} (2.99)	4.3 km	MPC · JPL
432226	2009 HU_{2}	—	April 19, 2009	Kitt Peak	Spacewatch	AMO	670 m	MPC · JPL
432227	2009 HT_{16}	—	February 20, 2009	Kitt Peak	Spacewatch	·	3.1 km	MPC · JPL
432228	2009 HQ_{20}	—	April 18, 2009	Mount Lemmon	Mount Lemmon Survey	THB	2.9 km	MPC · JPL
432229	2009 HL_{36}	—	April 19, 2009	Piszkéstető	K. Sárneczky	·	2.5 km	MPC · JPL
432230	2009 HD_{52}	—	April 17, 2009	Catalina	CSS	·	4.0 km	MPC · JPL
432231	2009 HV_{57}	—	April 18, 2009	Mount Lemmon	Mount Lemmon Survey	·	3.3 km	MPC · JPL
432232	2009 HQ_{58}	—	April 25, 2009	Andrushivka	Andrushivka	·	5.2 km	MPC · JPL
432233	2009 HZ_{89}	—	April 17, 2009	Catalina	CSS	·	3.4 km	MPC · JPL
432234	2009 KZ_{6}	—	April 29, 2009	Kitt Peak	Spacewatch	·	630 m	MPC · JPL
432235	2009 KF_{26}	—	May 18, 2009	Mount Lemmon	Mount Lemmon Survey	·	730 m	MPC · JPL
432236	2009 NO_{1}	—	July 15, 2009	La Sagra	OAM	·	810 m	MPC · JPL
432237	2009 OG_{22}	—	July 31, 2009	Siding Spring	SSS	·	1.2 km	MPC · JPL
432238	2009 OC_{23}	—	July 27, 2009	Catalina	CSS	·	700 m	MPC · JPL
432239	2009 PX	—	June 24, 2009	Mount Lemmon	Mount Lemmon Survey	·	570 m	MPC · JPL
432240	2009 PD_{6}	—	June 19, 2009	Kitt Peak	Spacewatch	·	710 m	MPC · JPL
432241	2009 PH_{8}	—	August 15, 2009	Catalina	CSS	EUN	1.3 km	MPC · JPL
432242	2009 PJ_{20}	—	August 15, 2009	Kitt Peak	Spacewatch	JUN	900 m	MPC · JPL
432243	2009 QT_{5}	—	August 16, 2009	Kitt Peak	Spacewatch	·	740 m	MPC · JPL
432244	2009 QK_{7}	—	August 17, 2009	Catalina	CSS	·	1.4 km	MPC · JPL
432245	2009 QL_{39}	—	August 20, 2009	Kitt Peak	Spacewatch	·	1.5 km	MPC · JPL
432246	2009 QZ_{41}	—	August 26, 2009	La Sagra	OAM	·	760 m	MPC · JPL
432247	2009 QY_{56}	—	August 18, 2009	Kitt Peak	Spacewatch	EUN	960 m	MPC · JPL
432248	2009 QC_{65}	—	November 23, 2006	Kitt Peak	Spacewatch	·	930 m	MPC · JPL
432249	2009 RK	—	September 9, 2009	La Sagra	OAM	·	760 m	MPC · JPL
432250	2009 RE_{10}	—	September 12, 2009	Kitt Peak	Spacewatch	·	990 m	MPC · JPL
432251	2009 RT_{10}	—	September 12, 2009	Kitt Peak	Spacewatch	·	590 m	MPC · JPL
432252	2009 RL_{20}	—	September 14, 2009	Catalina	CSS	·	1.5 km	MPC · JPL
432253	2009 RF_{31}	—	September 14, 2009	Kitt Peak	Spacewatch	·	1.4 km	MPC · JPL
432254	2009 RO_{42}	—	September 15, 2009	Kitt Peak	Spacewatch	EUN	1.1 km	MPC · JPL
432255	2009 RJ_{47}	—	September 15, 2009	Kitt Peak	Spacewatch	·	970 m	MPC · JPL
432256	2009 RE_{48}	—	September 15, 2009	Kitt Peak	Spacewatch	NYS	1.2 km	MPC · JPL
432257	2009 RZ_{54}	—	September 15, 2009	Kitt Peak	Spacewatch	V	590 m	MPC · JPL
432258	2009 RM_{58}	—	September 15, 2009	Kitt Peak	Spacewatch	·	950 m	MPC · JPL
432259	2009 RS_{62}	—	September 15, 2009	Kitt Peak	Spacewatch	V	890 m	MPC · JPL
432260	2009 RD_{63}	—	September 12, 2009	Kitt Peak	Spacewatch	L4	8.7 km	MPC · JPL
432261	2009 RL_{64}	—	September 15, 2009	Kitt Peak	Spacewatch	L4	7.8 km	MPC · JPL
432262	2009 SL_{18}	—	September 18, 2009	Nazaret	Muler, G.	·	1.0 km	MPC · JPL
432263	2009 SX_{21}	—	September 18, 2009	Kitt Peak	Spacewatch	·	730 m	MPC · JPL
432264	2009 SZ_{27}	—	September 16, 2009	Kitt Peak	Spacewatch	L4 · ERY	8.5 km	MPC · JPL
432265	2009 SU_{30}	—	September 16, 2009	Kitt Peak	Spacewatch	T_{j} (2.98) · 3:2	5.2 km	MPC · JPL
432266	2009 SD_{37}	—	September 16, 2009	Kitt Peak	Spacewatch	V	620 m	MPC · JPL
432267	2009 SC_{38}	—	September 16, 2009	Kitt Peak	Spacewatch	L4	10 km	MPC · JPL
432268	2009 SC_{46}	—	September 16, 2009	Kitt Peak	Spacewatch	·	1.2 km	MPC · JPL
432269	2009 SA_{47}	—	September 16, 2009	Kitt Peak	Spacewatch	·	960 m	MPC · JPL
432270	2009 SV_{53}	—	September 17, 2009	Kitt Peak	Spacewatch	V	580 m	MPC · JPL
432271	2009 SH_{76}	—	September 17, 2009	Kitt Peak	Spacewatch	L4	8.3 km	MPC · JPL
432272	2009 SP_{77}	—	September 17, 2009	Kitt Peak	Spacewatch	·	1.6 km	MPC · JPL
432273	2009 SD_{89}	—	September 18, 2009	Mount Lemmon	Mount Lemmon Survey	·	1.1 km	MPC · JPL
432274	2009 ST_{95}	—	September 19, 2009	Kitt Peak	Spacewatch	L4	7.6 km	MPC · JPL
432275	2009 SV_{125}	—	April 14, 2008	Mount Lemmon	Mount Lemmon Survey	V	620 m	MPC · JPL
432276	2009 SO_{132}	—	September 18, 2009	Kitt Peak	Spacewatch	(5)	880 m	MPC · JPL
432277	2009 SV_{132}	—	September 18, 2009	Kitt Peak	Spacewatch	NEM	1.7 km	MPC · JPL
432278	2009 SW_{145}	—	September 19, 2009	Mount Lemmon	Mount Lemmon Survey	3:2 · SHU	5.7 km	MPC · JPL
432279	2009 SS_{153}	—	September 20, 2009	Kitt Peak	Spacewatch	·	1.1 km	MPC · JPL
432280	2009 SG_{167}	—	August 16, 2009	Kitt Peak	Spacewatch	·	640 m	MPC · JPL
432281	2009 SD_{168}	—	September 26, 2009	Calvin-Rehoboth	L. A. Molnar	(5)	1.2 km	MPC · JPL
432282	2009 SZ_{173}	—	August 17, 2009	Kitt Peak	Spacewatch	·	1.3 km	MPC · JPL
432283	2009 SL_{191}	—	September 22, 2009	Kitt Peak	Spacewatch	·	1.1 km	MPC · JPL
432284	2009 SW_{207}	—	September 15, 2009	Kitt Peak	Spacewatch	(5)	910 m	MPC · JPL
432285	2009 SM_{209}	—	September 23, 2009	Kitt Peak	Spacewatch	L4	7.1 km	MPC · JPL
432286	2009 SV_{210}	—	September 23, 2009	Kitt Peak	Spacewatch	·	710 m	MPC · JPL
432287	2009 SF_{211}	—	September 23, 2009	Kitt Peak	Spacewatch	NYS	940 m	MPC · JPL
432288	2009 SS_{235}	—	September 18, 2009	Kitt Peak	Spacewatch	L4	11 km	MPC · JPL
432289	2009 SP_{250}	—	September 19, 2009	Kitt Peak	Spacewatch	·	840 m	MPC · JPL
432290	2009 SN_{253}	—	September 15, 2009	Kitt Peak	Spacewatch	·	1.0 km	MPC · JPL
432291	2009 SJ_{263}	—	August 29, 2009	Kitt Peak	Spacewatch	·	1.6 km	MPC · JPL
432292	2009 SZ_{267}	—	September 24, 2009	Kitt Peak	Spacewatch	·	750 m	MPC · JPL
432293	2009 SQ_{268}	—	September 16, 2009	Kitt Peak	Spacewatch	MAS	760 m	MPC · JPL
432294	2009 SD_{272}	—	September 20, 2009	Kitt Peak	Spacewatch	L4	8.2 km	MPC · JPL
432295	2009 SF_{273}	—	September 25, 2009	Catalina	CSS	·	1.2 km	MPC · JPL
432296	2009 SW_{274}	—	September 25, 2009	Kitt Peak	Spacewatch	·	730 m	MPC · JPL
432297	2009 SO_{280}	—	September 25, 2009	Kitt Peak	Spacewatch	·	1.4 km	MPC · JPL
432298	2009 SJ_{294}	—	September 27, 2009	Catalina	CSS	·	740 m	MPC · JPL
432299	2009 SK_{295}	—	March 11, 2007	Kitt Peak	Spacewatch	·	1.3 km	MPC · JPL
432300	2009 SN_{308}	—	September 17, 2009	Kitt Peak	Spacewatch	L4	8.6 km	MPC · JPL

== 432301–432400 ==
back to top

Designation			Discovery			Properties		Ref
Permanent	Provisional	Named after	Date	Site	Discoverer(s)	Category	Diam.	Ref
432301	2009 SH_{321}	—	September 17, 2009	Kitt Peak	Spacewatch	L4	10 km	MPC · JPL
432302	2009 SL_{343}	—	September 17, 2009	Kitt Peak	Spacewatch	·	890 m	MPC · JPL
432303	2009 SP_{345}	—	September 19, 2009	Kitt Peak	Spacewatch	·	730 m	MPC · JPL
432304	2009 SJ_{350}	—	September 22, 2009	Kitt Peak	Spacewatch	·	910 m	MPC · JPL
432305	2009 SY_{355}	—	September 19, 2009	Kitt Peak	Spacewatch	L4	7.7 km	MPC · JPL
432306	2009 SQ_{357}	—	September 25, 2009	Kitt Peak	Spacewatch	L4	7.3 km	MPC · JPL
432307	2009 TX	—	September 25, 2009	Catalina	CSS	·	1.2 km	MPC · JPL
432308	2009 TQ_{3}	—	October 11, 2009	La Sagra	OAM	·	1.3 km	MPC · JPL
432309	2009 TB_{11}	—	September 23, 2009	Kitt Peak	Spacewatch	·	2.2 km	MPC · JPL
432310	2009 TD_{12}	—	October 1, 2009	Mount Lemmon	Mount Lemmon Survey	JUN	1.2 km	MPC · JPL
432311	2009 TC_{16}	—	October 2, 2009	Mount Lemmon	Mount Lemmon Survey	NYS	1.2 km	MPC · JPL
432312	2009 TJ_{18}	—	October 9, 2009	Catalina	CSS	·	1.1 km	MPC · JPL
432313	2009 TJ_{20}	—	October 11, 2009	La Sagra	OAM	·	1.5 km	MPC · JPL
432314	2009 TL_{20}	—	September 28, 2009	Mount Lemmon	Mount Lemmon Survey	·	1.2 km	MPC · JPL
432315	2009 TP_{22}	—	September 18, 2009	Catalina	CSS	·	2.1 km	MPC · JPL
432316	2009 TK_{29}	—	September 25, 2009	Kitt Peak	Spacewatch	·	1.2 km	MPC · JPL
432317	2009 TG_{43}	—	October 2, 2009	Mount Lemmon	Mount Lemmon Survey	·	1.3 km	MPC · JPL
432318	2009 UN_{25}	—	October 18, 2009	Mount Lemmon	Mount Lemmon Survey	·	1.4 km	MPC · JPL
432319	2009 UG_{27}	—	October 21, 2009	Catalina	CSS	V	770 m	MPC · JPL
432320	2009 UE_{32}	—	October 18, 2009	Mount Lemmon	Mount Lemmon Survey	·	1.5 km	MPC · JPL
432321	2009 UV_{33}	—	September 21, 2009	Mount Lemmon	Mount Lemmon Survey	·	1.1 km	MPC · JPL
432322	2009 US_{38}	—	October 21, 2009	Catalina	CSS	EUN	1.6 km	MPC · JPL
432323	2009 UT_{39}	—	September 22, 2009	Mount Lemmon	Mount Lemmon Survey	·	1.4 km	MPC · JPL
432324	2009 UM_{78}	—	September 26, 2009	Kitt Peak	Spacewatch	L4	8.1 km	MPC · JPL
432325	2009 UL_{80}	—	October 22, 2009	Mount Lemmon	Mount Lemmon Survey	L4	10 km	MPC · JPL
432326	2009 UL_{83}	—	September 22, 2009	Mount Lemmon	Mount Lemmon Survey	·	1.2 km	MPC · JPL
432327	2009 UR_{85}	—	October 23, 2009	Mount Lemmon	Mount Lemmon Survey	·	910 m	MPC · JPL
432328	2009 UP_{89}	—	October 22, 2009	Bisei SG Center	BATTeRS	·	1.2 km	MPC · JPL
432329	2009 UD_{103}	—	October 24, 2009	Catalina	CSS	·	1.5 km	MPC · JPL
432330	2009 UK_{103}	—	September 18, 2009	Mount Lemmon	Mount Lemmon Survey	·	1.1 km	MPC · JPL
432331	2009 UH_{111}	—	October 23, 2009	Kitt Peak	Spacewatch	·	1.1 km	MPC · JPL
432332	2009 UU_{126}	—	October 21, 2009	Catalina	CSS	·	1.3 km	MPC · JPL
432333	2009 UC_{128}	—	October 25, 2009	Kitt Peak	Spacewatch	·	1.2 km	MPC · JPL
432334	2009 UP_{130}	—	October 24, 2009	Catalina	CSS	·	1.5 km	MPC · JPL
432335	2009 UO_{145}	—	September 18, 2009	Catalina	CSS	·	1.8 km	MPC · JPL
432336	2009 UL_{147}	—	October 18, 2009	Mount Lemmon	Mount Lemmon Survey	·	1.8 km	MPC · JPL
432337	2009 UT_{147}	—	October 17, 2009	Mount Lemmon	Mount Lemmon Survey	MAR	1 km	MPC · JPL
432338	2009 VH_{4}	—	November 8, 2009	Kitt Peak	Spacewatch	·	1.6 km	MPC · JPL
432339	2009 VQ_{16}	—	October 26, 2009	Mount Lemmon	Mount Lemmon Survey	·	2.2 km	MPC · JPL
432340	2009 VH_{23}	—	October 25, 2009	Kitt Peak	Spacewatch	L4	14 km	MPC · JPL
432341	2009 VM_{23}	—	November 9, 2009	Catalina	CSS	·	1.8 km	MPC · JPL
432342	2009 VT_{27}	—	November 8, 2009	Catalina	CSS	·	1.9 km	MPC · JPL
432343	2009 VH_{31}	—	October 9, 2002	Socorro	LINEAR	·	810 m	MPC · JPL
432344	2009 VG_{32}	—	November 9, 2009	Kitt Peak	Spacewatch	·	1.2 km	MPC · JPL
432345	2009 VY_{40}	—	November 8, 2009	Catalina	CSS	·	1.5 km	MPC · JPL
432346	2009 VB_{42}	—	November 11, 2009	Kitt Peak	Spacewatch	·	1.4 km	MPC · JPL
432347	2009 VO_{45}	—	November 14, 2009	Mayhill	Lowe, A.	·	1.1 km	MPC · JPL
432348	2009 VZ_{63}	—	November 8, 2009	Kitt Peak	Spacewatch	·	1.4 km	MPC · JPL
432349	2009 VH_{65}	—	November 9, 2009	Kitt Peak	Spacewatch	·	790 m	MPC · JPL
432350	2009 VX_{68}	—	November 9, 2009	Mount Lemmon	Mount Lemmon Survey	·	1.4 km	MPC · JPL
432351	2009 VD_{69}	—	November 9, 2009	Kitt Peak	Spacewatch	PHO	1.1 km	MPC · JPL
432352	2009 VX_{76}	—	November 8, 2009	Catalina	CSS	·	1.6 km	MPC · JPL
432353	2009 VB_{89}	—	October 21, 2009	Catalina	CSS	PHO	930 m	MPC · JPL
432354	2009 VN_{91}	—	September 27, 2009	Mount Lemmon	Mount Lemmon Survey	·	1.3 km	MPC · JPL
432355	2009 VG_{92}	—	November 8, 2009	Kitt Peak	Spacewatch	(5)	1.3 km	MPC · JPL
432356	2009 VV_{110}	—	November 10, 2009	Mount Lemmon	Mount Lemmon Survey	L4	10 km	MPC · JPL
432357	2009 VJ_{114}	—	November 10, 2009	Kitt Peak	Spacewatch	·	1.9 km	MPC · JPL
432358	2009 VP_{114}	—	November 11, 2009	Mount Lemmon	Mount Lemmon Survey	·	1.9 km	MPC · JPL
432359	2009 WK_{14}	—	November 16, 2009	Mount Lemmon	Mount Lemmon Survey	EUN	1.1 km	MPC · JPL
432360	2009 WZ_{23}	—	November 19, 2009	Kachina	Hobart, J.	·	1.1 km	MPC · JPL
432361 Rakovski	2009 WR_{24}	Rakovski	November 20, 2009	Plana	Fratev, F.	·	800 m	MPC · JPL
432362	2009 WF_{29}	—	October 16, 2009	Mount Lemmon	Mount Lemmon Survey	L4	7.6 km	MPC · JPL
432363	2009 WH_{32}	—	November 16, 2009	Kitt Peak	Spacewatch	·	1.6 km	MPC · JPL
432364	2009 WB_{34}	—	November 16, 2009	Kitt Peak	Spacewatch	·	1.7 km	MPC · JPL
432365	2009 WB_{35}	—	November 16, 2009	Mount Lemmon	Mount Lemmon Survey	·	1.8 km	MPC · JPL
432366	2009 WH_{57}	—	October 12, 2009	Mount Lemmon	Mount Lemmon Survey	·	1.8 km	MPC · JPL
432367	2009 WM_{69}	—	November 17, 2009	Mount Lemmon	Mount Lemmon Survey	·	2.2 km	MPC · JPL
432368	2009 WT_{71}	—	September 19, 2009	Mount Lemmon	Mount Lemmon Survey	·	1.1 km	MPC · JPL
432369	2009 WC_{78}	—	November 18, 2009	Mount Lemmon	Mount Lemmon Survey	·	780 m	MPC · JPL
432370	2009 WQ_{80}	—	November 18, 2009	Kitt Peak	Spacewatch	·	1.5 km	MPC · JPL
432371	2009 WH_{87}	—	January 4, 2006	Kitt Peak	Spacewatch	·	1.2 km	MPC · JPL
432372	2009 WR_{97}	—	January 28, 2006	Mount Lemmon	Mount Lemmon Survey	·	1.9 km	MPC · JPL
432373	2009 WK_{100}	—	February 4, 2006	Catalina	CSS	·	1.5 km	MPC · JPL
432374	2009 WC_{114}	—	April 13, 2008	Mount Lemmon	Mount Lemmon Survey	·	780 m	MPC · JPL
432375	2009 WY_{124}	—	November 20, 2009	Kitt Peak	Spacewatch	·	1.9 km	MPC · JPL
432376	2009 WM_{136}	—	December 2, 2005	Kitt Peak	Spacewatch	(5)	1.1 km	MPC · JPL
432377	2009 WB_{146}	—	October 21, 2009	Mount Lemmon	Mount Lemmon Survey	L4	14 km	MPC · JPL
432378	2009 WX_{160}	—	November 21, 2009	Kitt Peak	Spacewatch	·	880 m	MPC · JPL
432379	2009 WQ_{168}	—	November 22, 2009	Kitt Peak	Spacewatch	·	1.2 km	MPC · JPL
432380	2009 WS_{175}	—	November 23, 2009	Kitt Peak	Spacewatch	·	2.2 km	MPC · JPL
432381	2009 WK_{190}	—	January 13, 2002	Kitt Peak	Spacewatch	·	1.3 km	MPC · JPL
432382	2009 WG_{192}	—	November 24, 2009	Mount Lemmon	Mount Lemmon Survey	(5)	850 m	MPC · JPL
432383	2009 WJ_{195}	—	November 30, 2005	Kitt Peak	Spacewatch	MAR	1.1 km	MPC · JPL
432384	2009 WE_{196}	—	November 17, 2009	Kitt Peak	Spacewatch	·	1.3 km	MPC · JPL
432385	2009 WQ_{209}	—	November 17, 2009	Kitt Peak	Spacewatch	·	1.5 km	MPC · JPL
432386	2009 WA_{238}	—	November 17, 2009	Kitt Peak	Spacewatch	·	1.1 km	MPC · JPL
432387	2009 WS_{238}	—	November 6, 2005	Mount Lemmon	Mount Lemmon Survey	·	1.3 km	MPC · JPL
432388	2009 WQ_{242}	—	September 21, 2009	Mount Lemmon	Mount Lemmon Survey	·	1.4 km	MPC · JPL
432389	2009 WU_{244}	—	November 19, 2009	Mount Lemmon	Mount Lemmon Survey	(5)	1.7 km	MPC · JPL
432390	2009 WW_{253}	—	April 13, 2004	Kitt Peak	Spacewatch	V	660 m	MPC · JPL
432391	2009 WL_{262}	—	November 19, 2009	Catalina	CSS	·	1.3 km	MPC · JPL
432392	2009 XW_{2}	—	April 12, 2004	Kitt Peak	Spacewatch	L4	10 km	MPC · JPL
432393	2009 XW_{4}	—	November 16, 2009	Kitt Peak	Spacewatch	·	1.3 km	MPC · JPL
432394	2009 XL_{5}	—	November 20, 2009	Kitt Peak	Spacewatch	·	2.0 km	MPC · JPL
432395	2009 XN_{6}	—	December 10, 2009	Mount Lemmon	Mount Lemmon Survey	MAR	1.1 km	MPC · JPL
432396	2009 XE_{12}	—	October 25, 2009	Kitt Peak	Spacewatch	·	1.6 km	MPC · JPL
432397	2009 YT_{1}	—	December 17, 2009	Mount Lemmon	Mount Lemmon Survey	EUN	1.1 km	MPC · JPL
432398	2009 YO_{4}	—	December 17, 2009	Mount Lemmon	Mount Lemmon Survey	·	1.4 km	MPC · JPL
432399	2009 YE_{5}	—	December 17, 2009	Mount Lemmon	Mount Lemmon Survey	·	1.5 km	MPC · JPL
432400	2009 YE_{10}	—	November 16, 2009	Mount Lemmon	Mount Lemmon Survey	·	1.7 km	MPC · JPL

== 432401–432500 ==
back to top

Designation			Discovery			Properties		Ref
Permanent	Provisional	Named after	Date	Site	Discoverer(s)	Category	Diam.	Ref
432401	2009 YY_{14}	—	December 18, 2009	Mount Lemmon	Mount Lemmon Survey	·	2.2 km	MPC · JPL
432402	2009 YF_{21}	—	December 27, 2009	Kitt Peak	Spacewatch	EUN	1.4 km	MPC · JPL
432403	2009 YH_{22}	—	December 17, 2009	Mount Lemmon	Mount Lemmon Survey	EUN	1.3 km	MPC · JPL
432404	2009 YK_{23}	—	November 21, 2009	Mount Lemmon	Mount Lemmon Survey	·	2.5 km	MPC · JPL
432405	2010 AT	—	January 4, 2010	Kitt Peak	Spacewatch	·	2.0 km	MPC · JPL
432406	2010 AA_{1}	—	January 4, 2010	Kitt Peak	Spacewatch	·	1.4 km	MPC · JPL
432407	2010 AW_{2}	—	January 7, 2010	Mayhill	Nevski, V.	NEM	2.1 km	MPC · JPL
432408	2010 AZ_{4}	—	January 4, 2010	Kitt Peak	Spacewatch	·	2.4 km	MPC · JPL
432409	2010 AA_{8}	—	January 6, 2010	Catalina	CSS	·	2.6 km	MPC · JPL
432410	2010 AD_{8}	—	January 6, 2010	Catalina	CSS	·	2.2 km	MPC · JPL
432411	2010 AF_{9}	—	October 26, 2009	Mount Lemmon	Mount Lemmon Survey	JUN	1.1 km	MPC · JPL
432412	2010 AR_{23}	—	January 6, 2010	Kitt Peak	Spacewatch	·	2.1 km	MPC · JPL
432413	2010 AU_{26}	—	January 6, 2010	Mount Lemmon	Mount Lemmon Survey	·	2.8 km	MPC · JPL
432414	2010 AR_{31}	—	January 6, 2010	Kitt Peak	Spacewatch	·	2.6 km	MPC · JPL
432415	2010 AZ_{33}	—	January 7, 2010	Kitt Peak	Spacewatch	·	2.0 km	MPC · JPL
432416	2010 AE_{35}	—	January 7, 2010	Kitt Peak	Spacewatch	EUN	1.1 km	MPC · JPL
432417	2010 AC_{42}	—	January 6, 2010	Catalina	CSS	·	2.9 km	MPC · JPL
432418	2010 AK_{50}	—	January 8, 2010	Kitt Peak	Spacewatch	·	2.8 km	MPC · JPL
432419	2010 AQ_{59}	—	January 6, 2010	Catalina	CSS	EUN	1.4 km	MPC · JPL
432420	2010 AT_{59}	—	January 6, 2010	Catalina	CSS	·	1.7 km	MPC · JPL
432421	2010 AC_{64}	—	January 10, 2010	Kitt Peak	Spacewatch	·	2.9 km	MPC · JPL
432422	2010 AV_{64}	—	November 17, 2009	Kitt Peak	Spacewatch	·	2.0 km	MPC · JPL
432423	2010 AO_{79}	—	January 10, 2010	Kitt Peak	Spacewatch	·	2.2 km	MPC · JPL
432424	2010 AS_{82}	—	January 7, 2010	WISE	WISE	·	2.2 km	MPC · JPL
432425	2010 AP_{93}	—	January 8, 2010	WISE	WISE	·	6.6 km	MPC · JPL
432426	2010 AR_{97}	—	January 9, 2010	WISE	WISE	·	2.8 km	MPC · JPL
432427	2010 AK_{104}	—	January 2, 2009	Mount Lemmon	Mount Lemmon Survey	·	4.1 km	MPC · JPL
432428	2010 AH_{108}	—	January 12, 2010	WISE	WISE	L4	13 km	MPC · JPL
432429	2010 BQ_{43}	—	April 13, 2010	Mount Lemmon	Mount Lemmon Survey	·	3.2 km	MPC · JPL
432430	2010 BH_{51}	—	January 20, 2010	WISE	WISE	·	3.6 km	MPC · JPL
432431	2010 BW_{56}	—	May 13, 2010	Mount Lemmon	Mount Lemmon Survey	·	3.5 km	MPC · JPL
432432	2010 BY_{63}	—	January 21, 2010	WISE	WISE	·	3.7 km	MPC · JPL
432433	2010 BV_{75}	—	January 24, 2010	WISE	WISE	·	4.1 km	MPC · JPL
432434	2010 BH_{78}	—	January 24, 2010	WISE	WISE	·	5.1 km	MPC · JPL
432435	2010 BC_{79}	—	January 31, 2009	Kitt Peak	Spacewatch	·	3.0 km	MPC · JPL
432436	2010 BF_{81}	—	May 22, 2010	Mount Lemmon	Mount Lemmon Survey	·	3.9 km	MPC · JPL
432437	2010 BN_{91}	—	January 26, 2010	WISE	WISE	·	3.7 km	MPC · JPL
432438	2010 BX_{106}	—	January 16, 2009	Mount Lemmon	Mount Lemmon Survey	·	4.4 km	MPC · JPL
432439	2010 BY_{123}	—	July 23, 2010	WISE	WISE	·	3.8 km	MPC · JPL
432440	2010 CV_{8}	—	February 8, 2010	WISE	WISE	·	4.0 km	MPC · JPL
432441	2010 CC_{10}	—	February 8, 2010	WISE	WISE	·	4.6 km	MPC · JPL
432442	2010 CH_{23}	—	September 23, 2008	Kitt Peak	Spacewatch	·	2.3 km	MPC · JPL
432443	2010 CE_{33}	—	January 12, 2010	Kitt Peak	Spacewatch	AEO	1.1 km	MPC · JPL
432444	2010 CA_{40}	—	August 27, 2006	Kitt Peak	Spacewatch	·	2.5 km	MPC · JPL
432445	2010 CD_{43}	—	December 20, 2009	Mount Lemmon	Mount Lemmon Survey	·	2.7 km	MPC · JPL
432446	2010 CC_{45}	—	February 11, 2010	WISE	WISE	·	5.0 km	MPC · JPL
432447	2010 CX_{47}	—	February 12, 2010	WISE	WISE	LIX	4.0 km	MPC · JPL
432448	2010 CS_{62}	—	September 4, 2008	Kitt Peak	Spacewatch	·	2.0 km	MPC · JPL
432449	2010 CW_{66}	—	February 10, 2010	Kitt Peak	Spacewatch	(21344)	1.7 km	MPC · JPL
432450	2010 CY_{67}	—	September 20, 2003	Kitt Peak	Spacewatch	·	1.9 km	MPC · JPL
432451	2010 CY_{76}	—	February 13, 2010	Mount Lemmon	Mount Lemmon Survey	·	1.7 km	MPC · JPL
432452	2010 CM_{93}	—	February 14, 2010	Kitt Peak	Spacewatch	·	2.2 km	MPC · JPL
432453	2010 CN_{93}	—	February 14, 2010	Kitt Peak	Spacewatch	·	2.1 km	MPC · JPL
432454	2010 CL_{107}	—	February 14, 2010	Kitt Peak	Spacewatch	·	1.8 km	MPC · JPL
432455	2010 CG_{120}	—	December 19, 2009	Mount Lemmon	Mount Lemmon Survey	·	2.0 km	MPC · JPL
432456	2010 CA_{127}	—	April 20, 2006	Kitt Peak	Spacewatch	KOR	1.3 km	MPC · JPL
432457	2010 CU_{127}	—	February 13, 2010	LightBuckets	T. Vorobjov	·	1.5 km	MPC · JPL
432458	2010 CX_{127}	—	January 5, 2010	Kitt Peak	Spacewatch	·	3.4 km	MPC · JPL
432459	2010 CZ_{136}	—	February 15, 2010	WISE	WISE	·	4.7 km	MPC · JPL
432460	2010 CZ_{138}	—	March 23, 2006	Kitt Peak	Spacewatch	·	1.7 km	MPC · JPL
432461	2010 CL_{140}	—	January 18, 2009	Mount Lemmon	Mount Lemmon Survey	·	2.5 km	MPC · JPL
432462	2010 CZ_{141}	—	February 5, 2010	Catalina	CSS	·	3.2 km	MPC · JPL
432463	2010 CK_{143}	—	January 25, 1996	Kitt Peak	Spacewatch	·	1.8 km	MPC · JPL
432464	2010 CO_{143}	—	November 27, 2009	Mount Lemmon	Mount Lemmon Survey	TEL	1.7 km	MPC · JPL
432465	2010 CT_{152}	—	February 14, 2010	Mount Lemmon	Mount Lemmon Survey	EOS	1.8 km	MPC · JPL
432466	2010 CM_{158}	—	February 15, 2010	Mount Lemmon	Mount Lemmon Survey	·	1.9 km	MPC · JPL
432467	2010 CX_{192}	—	November 8, 2007	Mount Lemmon	Mount Lemmon Survey	·	3.7 km	MPC · JPL
432468	2010 CT_{228}	—	February 1, 2009	Kitt Peak	Spacewatch	·	4.7 km	MPC · JPL
432469	2010 DK_{6}	—	February 16, 2010	Kitt Peak	Spacewatch	·	5.2 km	MPC · JPL
432470	2010 DU_{11}	—	March 13, 2005	Kitt Peak	Spacewatch	·	1.9 km	MPC · JPL
432471	2010 DX_{27}	—	February 18, 2010	WISE	WISE	·	3.6 km	MPC · JPL
432472	2010 DP_{33}	—	February 20, 2010	WISE	WISE	·	3.1 km	MPC · JPL
432473	2010 DU_{33}	—	February 20, 2010	WISE	WISE	·	5.1 km	MPC · JPL
432474	2010 DR_{37}	—	February 13, 2010	Mount Lemmon	Mount Lemmon Survey	·	1.1 km	MPC · JPL
432475	2010 DT_{43}	—	February 17, 2010	Kitt Peak	Spacewatch	·	2.2 km	MPC · JPL
432476	2010 DA_{54}	—	February 23, 2010	WISE	WISE	·	5.2 km	MPC · JPL
432477	2010 DB_{56}	—	February 23, 2010	WISE	WISE	·	3.3 km	MPC · JPL
432478	2010 DJ_{58}	—	February 24, 2010	WISE	WISE	·	2.7 km	MPC · JPL
432479	2010 DK_{59}	—	February 24, 2010	WISE	WISE	·	3.2 km	MPC · JPL
432480	2010 DZ_{65}	—	February 27, 2010	WISE	WISE	·	4.4 km	MPC · JPL
432481	2010 DE_{70}	—	February 28, 2010	WISE	WISE	·	4.8 km	MPC · JPL
432482	2010 DU_{71}	—	February 26, 2010	WISE	WISE	·	3.0 km	MPC · JPL
432483	2010 DC_{74}	—	March 1, 2005	Kitt Peak	Spacewatch	·	1.9 km	MPC · JPL
432484	2010 EK_{33}	—	May 20, 2006	Kitt Peak	Spacewatch	·	2.1 km	MPC · JPL
432485	2010 EO_{33}	—	March 4, 2010	Kitt Peak	Spacewatch	·	2.3 km	MPC · JPL
432486	2010 EY_{37}	—	March 12, 2010	Mount Lemmon	Mount Lemmon Survey	·	2.9 km	MPC · JPL
432487	2010 EA_{42}	—	March 12, 2010	Mount Lemmon	Mount Lemmon Survey	·	2.1 km	MPC · JPL
432488	2010 EX_{42}	—	March 12, 2010	Catalina	CSS	·	3.5 km	MPC · JPL
432489	2010 EV_{65}	—	February 24, 2006	Kitt Peak	Spacewatch	·	2.2 km	MPC · JPL
432490	2010 EK_{77}	—	March 12, 2010	Kitt Peak	Spacewatch	·	1.4 km	MPC · JPL
432491	2010 EB_{79}	—	March 12, 2010	Mount Lemmon	Mount Lemmon Survey	BRA	1.1 km	MPC · JPL
432492	2010 EM_{81}	—	March 12, 2010	Catalina	CSS	·	3.4 km	MPC · JPL
432493	2010 ED_{87}	—	March 13, 2010	Kitt Peak	Spacewatch	·	2.1 km	MPC · JPL
432494	2010 EQ_{88}	—	August 22, 2003	Campo Imperatore	CINEOS	·	2.2 km	MPC · JPL
432495	2010 ES_{91}	—	March 14, 2010	Kitt Peak	Spacewatch	·	1.6 km	MPC · JPL
432496	2010 EA_{103}	—	March 17, 2005	Mount Lemmon	Mount Lemmon Survey	·	1.7 km	MPC · JPL
432497	2010 EK_{103}	—	September 17, 2003	Kitt Peak	Spacewatch	GEF	1.3 km	MPC · JPL
432498	2010 ET_{112}	—	March 13, 2010	Kitt Peak	Spacewatch	·	2.9 km	MPC · JPL
432499	2010 EH_{138}	—	March 13, 2010	Mount Lemmon	Mount Lemmon Survey	·	1.9 km	MPC · JPL
432500	2010 ED_{140}	—	March 15, 2010	Mount Lemmon	Mount Lemmon Survey	EOS	1.7 km	MPC · JPL

== 432501–432600 ==
back to top

Designation			Discovery			Properties		Ref
Permanent	Provisional	Named after	Date	Site	Discoverer(s)	Category	Diam.	Ref
432501	2010 EE_{141}	—	March 12, 2010	Kitt Peak	Spacewatch	·	3.3 km	MPC · JPL
432502	2010 EG_{142}	—	March 14, 2010	Kitt Peak	Spacewatch	·	4.5 km	MPC · JPL
432503	2010 EW_{152}	—	March 11, 2010	WISE	WISE	·	3.5 km	MPC · JPL
432504	2010 ER_{171}	—	October 27, 2008	Mount Lemmon	Mount Lemmon Survey	·	2.2 km	MPC · JPL
432505	2010 EZ_{171}	—	November 14, 1998	Kitt Peak	Spacewatch	·	2.0 km	MPC · JPL
432506	2010 FW_{1}	—	February 18, 2010	Kitt Peak	Spacewatch	·	1.7 km	MPC · JPL
432507	2010 FN_{2}	—	March 16, 2010	Mount Lemmon	Mount Lemmon Survey	·	3.9 km	MPC · JPL
432508	2010 FA_{4}	—	October 19, 2007	Catalina	CSS	·	3.6 km	MPC · JPL
432509	2010 FF_{7}	—	March 19, 2010	Catalina	CSS	APO	450 m	MPC · JPL
432510	2010 FG_{13}	—	February 19, 2010	Catalina	CSS	·	4.5 km	MPC · JPL
432511	2010 FZ_{16}	—	March 18, 2010	Kitt Peak	Spacewatch	·	2.4 km	MPC · JPL
432512	2010 FH_{17}	—	March 18, 2010	Mount Lemmon	Mount Lemmon Survey	·	3.7 km	MPC · JPL
432513	2010 FJ_{25}	—	February 16, 2010	Kitt Peak	Spacewatch	·	3.7 km	MPC · JPL
432514	2010 FT_{30}	—	March 16, 2010	Kitt Peak	Spacewatch	·	2.5 km	MPC · JPL
432515	2010 FN_{55}	—	March 19, 1999	Kitt Peak	Spacewatch	·	2.6 km	MPC · JPL
432516	2010 FW_{56}	—	October 9, 2007	Mount Lemmon	Mount Lemmon Survey	·	3.0 km	MPC · JPL
432517	2010 FH_{90}	—	March 20, 2010	Kitt Peak	Spacewatch	·	2.6 km	MPC · JPL
432518	2010 FK_{93}	—	March 16, 2004	Kitt Peak	Spacewatch	·	2.9 km	MPC · JPL
432519	2010 FV_{99}	—	March 12, 2010	Kitt Peak	Spacewatch	EOS	1.8 km	MPC · JPL
432520	2010 FA_{100}	—	March 25, 2010	Kitt Peak	Spacewatch	·	3.7 km	MPC · JPL
432521	2010 FA_{101}	—	March 25, 2010	Mount Lemmon	Mount Lemmon Survey	·	2.7 km	MPC · JPL
432522	2010 GY_{34}	—	April 9, 2010	Socorro	LINEAR	H	490 m	MPC · JPL
432523	2010 GB_{75}	—	April 5, 2010	Catalina	CSS	T_{j} (2.99)	4.7 km	MPC · JPL
432524	2010 GE_{97}	—	April 6, 2010	Kitt Peak	Spacewatch	TIR	2.7 km	MPC · JPL
432525	2010 GW_{97}	—	April 10, 2010	Kitt Peak	Spacewatch	·	3.4 km	MPC · JPL
432526	2010 GA_{98}	—	March 13, 2010	Mount Lemmon	Mount Lemmon Survey	·	3.2 km	MPC · JPL
432527	2010 GJ_{101}	—	April 5, 2010	Kitt Peak	Spacewatch	·	1.9 km	MPC · JPL
432528	2010 GZ_{116}	—	April 10, 2010	Mount Lemmon	Mount Lemmon Survey	·	3.7 km	MPC · JPL
432529	2010 GU_{118}	—	April 11, 2010	Kitt Peak	Spacewatch	·	1.8 km	MPC · JPL
432530	2010 GV_{118}	—	March 17, 2004	Kitt Peak	Spacewatch	·	2.6 km	MPC · JPL
432531	2010 GO_{120}	—	April 11, 2010	Kitt Peak	Spacewatch	·	4.3 km	MPC · JPL
432532	2010 GP_{123}	—	April 14, 2010	Kitt Peak	Spacewatch	·	2.5 km	MPC · JPL
432533	2010 GV_{123}	—	March 13, 2010	Kitt Peak	Spacewatch	THM	1.9 km	MPC · JPL
432534	2010 GT_{125}	—	August 23, 2001	Kitt Peak	Spacewatch	·	1.3 km	MPC · JPL
432535	2010 GH_{127}	—	March 15, 2004	Kitt Peak	Spacewatch	EOS	1.9 km	MPC · JPL
432536	2010 GB_{129}	—	April 5, 2010	Kitt Peak	Spacewatch	EMA	3.1 km	MPC · JPL
432537	2010 GK_{130}	—	November 13, 2007	Mount Lemmon	Mount Lemmon Survey	·	1.7 km	MPC · JPL
432538	2010 GT_{131}	—	April 10, 2010	Kitt Peak	Spacewatch	·	2.9 km	MPC · JPL
432539	2010 GK_{132}	—	April 10, 2010	Mount Lemmon	Mount Lemmon Survey	·	2.2 km	MPC · JPL
432540	2010 GT_{156}	—	April 9, 2010	Kitt Peak	Spacewatch	LIX	3.4 km	MPC · JPL
432541	2010 HE	—	April 18, 2010	Hagen	Klein, M.	·	3.3 km	MPC · JPL
432542	2010 HV_{60}	—	December 2, 2004	Anderson Mesa	LONEOS	DOR	2.9 km	MPC · JPL
432543	2010 HT_{78}	—	September 27, 2006	Kitt Peak	Spacewatch	·	2.1 km	MPC · JPL
432544	2010 HJ_{79}	—	April 17, 2010	Mount Lemmon	Mount Lemmon Survey	·	2.2 km	MPC · JPL
432545	2010 HT_{79}	—	April 20, 2010	Kitt Peak	Spacewatch	·	3.0 km	MPC · JPL
432546	2010 HW_{80}	—	April 26, 2010	Mount Lemmon	Mount Lemmon Survey	·	2.8 km	MPC · JPL
432547	2010 JP_{2}	—	April 15, 2010	Kitt Peak	Spacewatch	·	1.9 km	MPC · JPL
432548	2010 JH_{31}	—	July 11, 2005	Mount Lemmon	Mount Lemmon Survey	·	2.8 km	MPC · JPL
432549	2010 JE_{43}	—	May 3, 2010	Kitt Peak	Spacewatch	·	3.1 km	MPC · JPL
432550	2010 JC_{45}	—	February 20, 2009	Mount Lemmon	Mount Lemmon Survey	·	3.3 km	MPC · JPL
432551	2010 JL_{45}	—	May 7, 2010	Kitt Peak	Spacewatch	·	5.4 km	MPC · JPL
432552	2010 JR_{45}	—	November 19, 2006	Kitt Peak	Spacewatch	·	2.9 km	MPC · JPL
432553	2010 JB_{47}	—	May 9, 2010	Mount Lemmon	Mount Lemmon Survey	·	3.0 km	MPC · JPL
432554	2010 JR_{47}	—	May 3, 2010	Kitt Peak	Spacewatch	·	4.0 km	MPC · JPL
432555	2010 JY_{48}	—	November 8, 2008	Mount Lemmon	Mount Lemmon Survey	·	2.2 km	MPC · JPL
432556	2010 JF_{75}	—	May 2, 2010	Kitt Peak	Spacewatch	·	2.7 km	MPC · JPL
432557	2010 JR_{77}	—	May 6, 2010	Kitt Peak	Spacewatch	·	3.5 km	MPC · JPL
432558	2010 JQ_{79}	—	February 14, 2010	WISE	WISE	·	3.6 km	MPC · JPL
432559	2010 JZ_{79}	—	May 12, 2010	Mount Lemmon	Mount Lemmon Survey	·	3.5 km	MPC · JPL
432560	2010 JM_{80}	—	May 7, 2010	Socorro	LINEAR	·	4.0 km	MPC · JPL
432561	2010 JO_{80}	—	May 7, 2010	Socorro	LINEAR	H	590 m	MPC · JPL
432562	2010 JE_{84}	—	January 29, 2009	Mount Lemmon	Mount Lemmon Survey	·	2.2 km	MPC · JPL
432563	2010 JJ_{89}	—	May 9, 2010	WISE	WISE	·	4.8 km	MPC · JPL
432564	2010 JO_{110}	—	August 21, 2006	Kitt Peak	Spacewatch	·	2.3 km	MPC · JPL
432565	2010 JK_{115}	—	April 9, 2010	Catalina	CSS	·	3.4 km	MPC · JPL
432566	2010 JL_{120}	—	April 26, 2010	Mount Lemmon	Mount Lemmon Survey	·	2.5 km	MPC · JPL
432567	2010 JV_{160}	—	May 5, 2010	Mount Lemmon	Mount Lemmon Survey	VER	4.2 km	MPC · JPL
432568	2010 LD_{62}	—	November 14, 2007	Kitt Peak	Spacewatch	·	3.6 km	MPC · JPL
432569	2010 LY_{103}	—	June 12, 2010	Kitt Peak	Spacewatch	H	470 m	MPC · JPL
432570	2010 NK_{37}	—	August 19, 2006	Kitt Peak	Spacewatch	·	4.4 km	MPC · JPL
432571	2010 NY_{38}	—	July 8, 2010	WISE	WISE	·	1.2 km	MPC · JPL
432572	2010 OR_{47}	—	July 22, 2010	WISE	WISE	·	3.3 km	MPC · JPL
432573	2010 OJ_{48}	—	July 22, 2010	WISE	WISE	·	5.6 km	MPC · JPL
432574	2010 OA_{53}	—	May 11, 2005	Kitt Peak	Spacewatch	·	2.9 km	MPC · JPL
432575	2010 OV_{57}	—	July 23, 2010	WISE	WISE	·	4.6 km	MPC · JPL
432576	2010 OB_{62}	—	July 24, 2010	WISE	WISE	·	3.6 km	MPC · JPL
432577	2010 OZ_{67}	—	July 24, 2010	WISE	WISE	·	3.7 km	MPC · JPL
432578	2010 OR_{75}	—	July 25, 2010	WISE	WISE	·	4.4 km	MPC · JPL
432579	2010 OX_{83}	—	July 26, 2010	WISE	WISE	·	3.8 km	MPC · JPL
432580	2010 OF_{84}	—	July 26, 2010	WISE	WISE	T_{j} (2.97)	3.4 km	MPC · JPL
432581	2010 OF_{99}	—	July 28, 2010	WISE	WISE	·	3.4 km	MPC · JPL
432582	2010 OV_{104}	—	April 8, 2010	Mount Lemmon	Mount Lemmon Survey	·	3.2 km	MPC · JPL
432583	2010 PZ_{56}	—	August 10, 2010	Kitt Peak	Spacewatch	·	750 m	MPC · JPL
432584	2010 PU_{60}	—	August 10, 2010	Kitt Peak	Spacewatch	·	840 m	MPC · JPL
432585	2010 QH_{7}	—	February 4, 2005	Kitt Peak	Spacewatch	·	640 m	MPC · JPL
432586	2010 RM_{61}	—	March 8, 2005	Mount Lemmon	Mount Lemmon Survey	·	1.4 km	MPC · JPL
432587	2010 RY_{88}	—	November 24, 2003	Kitt Peak	Spacewatch	·	980 m	MPC · JPL
432588	2010 RZ_{99}	—	August 6, 2010	Kitt Peak	Spacewatch	·	620 m	MPC · JPL
432589	2010 RC_{103}	—	September 10, 2010	Kitt Peak	Spacewatch	·	700 m	MPC · JPL
432590	2010 RZ_{104}	—	September 10, 2010	Kitt Peak	Spacewatch	·	580 m	MPC · JPL
432591	2010 RP_{107}	—	November 11, 2007	Mount Lemmon	Mount Lemmon Survey	·	640 m	MPC · JPL
432592	2010 RO_{123}	—	December 20, 2004	Mount Lemmon	Mount Lemmon Survey	·	550 m	MPC · JPL
432593	2010 RF_{128}	—	September 14, 2010	Kitt Peak	Spacewatch	·	650 m	MPC · JPL
432594	2010 RC_{144}	—	January 29, 1998	Kitt Peak	Spacewatch	·	570 m	MPC · JPL
432595	2010 RL_{166}	—	September 11, 2010	Kitt Peak	Spacewatch	·	990 m	MPC · JPL
432596	2010 RO_{166}	—	September 11, 2010	Kitt Peak	Spacewatch	·	780 m	MPC · JPL
432597	2010 RN_{177}	—	September 11, 2010	Kitt Peak	Spacewatch	·	610 m	MPC · JPL
432598	2010 SJ_{3}	—	December 17, 2007	Mount Lemmon	Mount Lemmon Survey	·	540 m	MPC · JPL
432599	2010 SC_{15}	—	March 4, 2008	Mount Lemmon	Mount Lemmon Survey	·	990 m	MPC · JPL
432600	2010 SQ_{29}	—	November 4, 2007	Mount Lemmon	Mount Lemmon Survey	·	610 m	MPC · JPL

== 432601–432700 ==
back to top

Designation			Discovery			Properties		Ref
Permanent	Provisional	Named after	Date	Site	Discoverer(s)	Category	Diam.	Ref
432601	2010 TE_{2}	—	February 3, 2008	Mount Lemmon	Mount Lemmon Survey	·	710 m	MPC · JPL
432602	2010 TH_{78}	—	September 10, 2010	Kitt Peak	Spacewatch	·	620 m	MPC · JPL
432603	2010 TX_{103}	—	September 16, 2010	Kitt Peak	Spacewatch	·	450 m	MPC · JPL
432604	2010 TL_{126}	—	December 18, 2007	Mount Lemmon	Mount Lemmon Survey	(883)	470 m	MPC · JPL
432605	2010 TS_{171}	—	October 13, 2010	Mount Lemmon	Mount Lemmon Survey	·	690 m	MPC · JPL
432606	2010 TT_{179}	—	September 16, 2010	Kitt Peak	Spacewatch	·	570 m	MPC · JPL
432607	2010 TX_{187}	—	November 3, 2007	Mount Lemmon	Mount Lemmon Survey	·	580 m	MPC · JPL
432608	2010 UU_{10}	—	October 17, 2010	Mount Lemmon	Mount Lemmon Survey	·	940 m	MPC · JPL
432609	2010 UP_{11}	—	December 31, 2007	Mount Lemmon	Mount Lemmon Survey	·	590 m	MPC · JPL
432610	2010 UV_{11}	—	September 18, 2010	Mount Lemmon	Mount Lemmon Survey	·	780 m	MPC · JPL
432611	2010 UV_{16}	—	October 1, 2009	Mount Lemmon	Mount Lemmon Survey	L4	15 km	MPC · JPL
432612	2010 UP_{21}	—	October 11, 2010	Catalina	CSS	·	670 m	MPC · JPL
432613	2010 US_{41}	—	January 12, 2008	Mount Lemmon	Mount Lemmon Survey	·	760 m	MPC · JPL
432614	2010 UP_{66}	—	November 19, 2003	Kitt Peak	Spacewatch	·	670 m	MPC · JPL
432615	2010 UF_{78}	—	October 30, 2010	Mount Lemmon	Mount Lemmon Survey	L4	6.8 km	MPC · JPL
432616	2010 UQ_{92}	—	October 3, 2003	Haleakala	NEAT	·	960 m	MPC · JPL
432617	2010 UL_{97}	—	October 28, 2010	Mount Lemmon	Mount Lemmon Survey	L4	9.5 km	MPC · JPL
432618	2010 UH_{101}	—	November 7, 2007	Mount Lemmon	Mount Lemmon Survey	·	660 m	MPC · JPL
432619	2010 VV_{13}	—	February 9, 2008	Kitt Peak	Spacewatch	·	1.0 km	MPC · JPL
432620	2010 VV_{18}	—	November 2, 2007	Mount Lemmon	Mount Lemmon Survey	·	780 m	MPC · JPL
432621	2010 VK_{25}	—	November 18, 2000	Kitt Peak	Spacewatch	·	540 m	MPC · JPL
432622	2010 VG_{27}	—	December 19, 2003	Socorro	LINEAR	·	1.0 km	MPC · JPL
432623	2010 VU_{37}	—	November 20, 2007	Mount Lemmon	Mount Lemmon Survey	·	750 m	MPC · JPL
432624	2010 VQ_{62}	—	September 15, 2006	Kitt Peak	Spacewatch	·	800 m	MPC · JPL
432625	2010 VP_{66}	—	October 17, 2009	Mount Lemmon	Mount Lemmon Survey	L4	8.3 km	MPC · JPL
432626	2010 VP_{82}	—	August 27, 2006	Kitt Peak	Spacewatch	MAS	750 m	MPC · JPL
432627	2010 VP_{85}	—	October 28, 2010	Kitt Peak	Spacewatch	·	660 m	MPC · JPL
432628	2010 VR_{91}	—	November 6, 2010	Kitt Peak	Spacewatch	·	720 m	MPC · JPL
432629	2010 VC_{94}	—	September 28, 2009	Mount Lemmon	Mount Lemmon Survey	L4 · ERY	7.8 km	MPC · JPL
432630	2010 VJ_{118}	—	September 5, 2010	Mount Lemmon	Mount Lemmon Survey	·	870 m	MPC · JPL
432631	2010 VV_{123}	—	October 29, 2010	Mount Lemmon	Mount Lemmon Survey	·	600 m	MPC · JPL
432632	2010 VN_{127}	—	August 21, 2006	Kitt Peak	Spacewatch	NYS	710 m	MPC · JPL
432633	2010 VB_{131}	—	September 10, 2010	Kitt Peak	Spacewatch	·	540 m	MPC · JPL
432634	2010 VJ_{135}	—	March 28, 2008	Mount Lemmon	Mount Lemmon Survey	MAS	520 m	MPC · JPL
432635	2010 VJ_{161}	—	October 2, 2003	Kitt Peak	Spacewatch	·	560 m	MPC · JPL
432636	2010 VM_{161}	—	September 29, 2009	Kitt Peak	Spacewatch	L4	9.2 km	MPC · JPL
432637	2010 VK_{170}	—	December 15, 1998	Kitt Peak	Spacewatch	L4 · 006	10 km	MPC · JPL
432638	2010 VE_{173}	—	September 5, 1999	Kitt Peak	Spacewatch	·	670 m	MPC · JPL
432639	2010 VC_{185}	—	September 15, 2009	Kitt Peak	Spacewatch	L4	7.8 km	MPC · JPL
432640	2010 VH_{186}	—	November 13, 2010	Mount Lemmon	Mount Lemmon Survey	V	440 m	MPC · JPL
432641	2010 VM_{207}	—	October 31, 2010	Mount Lemmon	Mount Lemmon Survey	·	660 m	MPC · JPL
432642	2010 VY_{213}	—	October 21, 2003	Kitt Peak	Spacewatch	·	450 m	MPC · JPL
432643	2010 WT_{26}	—	October 21, 1995	Kitt Peak	Spacewatch	·	770 m	MPC · JPL
432644	2010 WN_{31}	—	May 19, 2006	Mount Lemmon	Mount Lemmon Survey	·	620 m	MPC · JPL
432645	2010 WZ_{31}	—	March 7, 2008	Kitt Peak	Spacewatch	·	480 m	MPC · JPL
432646	2010 WT_{39}	—	November 13, 2010	Kitt Peak	Spacewatch	·	730 m	MPC · JPL
432647	2010 WH_{40}	—	November 27, 2010	Mount Lemmon	Mount Lemmon Survey	·	590 m	MPC · JPL
432648	2010 WQ_{54}	—	February 28, 2008	Kitt Peak	Spacewatch	·	720 m	MPC · JPL
432649	2010 WV_{65}	—	December 18, 2003	Socorro	LINEAR	·	650 m	MPC · JPL
432650	2010 XQ_{25}	—	May 15, 2005	Mount Lemmon	Mount Lemmon Survey	L4	10 km	MPC · JPL
432651	2010 XQ_{34}	—	December 2, 2010	Mount Lemmon	Mount Lemmon Survey	·	580 m	MPC · JPL
432652	2010 XG_{47}	—	October 23, 1998	Kitt Peak	Spacewatch	L4	8.0 km	MPC · JPL
432653	2010 XR_{54}	—	October 21, 2003	Kitt Peak	Spacewatch	·	550 m	MPC · JPL
432654	2010 XE_{61}	—	November 5, 2010	Kitt Peak	Spacewatch	·	770 m	MPC · JPL
432655	2010 XL_{69}	—	December 14, 2010	Mount Lemmon	Mount Lemmon Survey	AMO	400 m	MPC · JPL
432656	2010 XR_{74}	—	October 30, 2010	Kitt Peak	Spacewatch	·	560 m	MPC · JPL
432657	2011 AE_{9}	—	September 18, 2006	Kitt Peak	Spacewatch	·	670 m	MPC · JPL
432658	2011 AN_{9}	—	December 17, 2003	Kitt Peak	Spacewatch	V	630 m	MPC · JPL
432659	2011 AF_{12}	—	October 18, 2006	Kitt Peak	Spacewatch	NYS	880 m	MPC · JPL
432660	2011 AR_{12}	—	November 11, 2010	Mount Lemmon	Mount Lemmon Survey	V	680 m	MPC · JPL
432661	2011 AE_{13}	—	November 11, 2006	Kitt Peak	Spacewatch	·	1.2 km	MPC · JPL
432662	2011 AJ_{13}	—	January 13, 2004	Anderson Mesa	LONEOS	·	860 m	MPC · JPL
432663	2011 AF_{30}	—	April 29, 2008	Mount Lemmon	Mount Lemmon Survey	·	1.0 km	MPC · JPL
432664	2011 AR_{30}	—	January 9, 2011	Kitt Peak	Spacewatch	·	950 m	MPC · JPL
432665	2011 AM_{32}	—	April 5, 2008	Mount Lemmon	Mount Lemmon Survey	NYS	1.2 km	MPC · JPL
432666	2011 AV_{37}	—	January 8, 2011	Mount Lemmon	Mount Lemmon Survey	·	1.1 km	MPC · JPL
432667	2011 AA_{44}	—	December 15, 2006	Kitt Peak	Spacewatch	·	1.1 km	MPC · JPL
432668	2011 AJ_{47}	—	October 2, 2006	Mount Lemmon	Mount Lemmon Survey	·	850 m	MPC · JPL
432669	2011 AS_{50}	—	August 27, 2009	Kitt Peak	Spacewatch	·	1 km	MPC · JPL
432670	2011 AT_{51}	—	December 16, 2006	Kitt Peak	Spacewatch	MAS	530 m	MPC · JPL
432671	2011 AO_{57}	—	March 29, 2004	Kitt Peak	Spacewatch	NYS	1.0 km	MPC · JPL
432672	2011 BH	—	January 27, 2000	Kitt Peak	Spacewatch	NYS	850 m	MPC · JPL
432673	2011 BO	—	November 1, 2006	Mount Lemmon	Mount Lemmon Survey	NYS	1.0 km	MPC · JPL
432674	2011 BE_{8}	—	March 20, 2004	Kitt Peak	Spacewatch	·	1 km	MPC · JPL
432675	2011 BE_{9}	—	November 22, 2006	Catalina	CSS	·	1.0 km	MPC · JPL
432676	2011 BH_{12}	—	October 27, 2006	Mount Lemmon	Mount Lemmon Survey	·	860 m	MPC · JPL
432677	2011 BF_{13}	—	April 14, 2004	Kitt Peak	Spacewatch	·	1.2 km	MPC · JPL
432678	2011 BC_{14}	—	October 27, 2005	Mount Lemmon	Mount Lemmon Survey	·	1.5 km	MPC · JPL
432679	2011 BR_{16}	—	January 9, 2011	Mount Lemmon	Mount Lemmon Survey	MAS	690 m	MPC · JPL
432680	2011 BY_{31}	—	September 26, 2006	Kitt Peak	Spacewatch	·	800 m	MPC · JPL
432681	2011 BF_{36}	—	November 23, 2006	Kitt Peak	Spacewatch	NYS	950 m	MPC · JPL
432682	2011 BD_{38}	—	October 27, 2005	Catalina	CSS	JUN	1.0 km	MPC · JPL
432683	2011 BW_{38}	—	February 21, 2007	Kitt Peak	Spacewatch	·	820 m	MPC · JPL
432684	2011 BT_{39}	—	October 27, 1994	Kitt Peak	Spacewatch	·	1.2 km	MPC · JPL
432685	2011 BS_{51}	—	April 21, 2004	Campo Imperatore	CINEOS	·	1.2 km	MPC · JPL
432686	2011 BF_{55}	—	January 17, 2007	Kitt Peak	Spacewatch	·	860 m	MPC · JPL
432687	2011 BT_{55}	—	December 21, 2006	Kitt Peak	Spacewatch	·	1.4 km	MPC · JPL
432688	2011 BK_{63}	—	December 15, 2006	Kitt Peak	Spacewatch	MAS	660 m	MPC · JPL
432689	2011 BH_{73}	—	April 28, 2008	Mount Lemmon	Mount Lemmon Survey	·	1.1 km	MPC · JPL
432690	2011 BK_{74}	—	February 22, 2007	Kitt Peak	Spacewatch	·	1.3 km	MPC · JPL
432691	2011 BQ_{75}	—	July 18, 2007	Mount Lemmon	Mount Lemmon Survey	·	3.2 km	MPC · JPL
432692	2011 BG_{80}	—	November 28, 2006	Kitt Peak	Spacewatch	NYS	1.2 km	MPC · JPL
432693	2011 BZ_{86}	—	November 28, 2006	Mount Lemmon	Mount Lemmon Survey	·	1.2 km	MPC · JPL
432694	2011 BB_{92}	—	January 28, 2011	Mount Lemmon	Mount Lemmon Survey	PHO	900 m	MPC · JPL
432695	2011 BX_{94}	—	January 10, 2011	Mount Lemmon	Mount Lemmon Survey	NYS	1.1 km	MPC · JPL
432696	2011 BR_{97}	—	January 9, 2011	Mount Lemmon	Mount Lemmon Survey	·	1.1 km	MPC · JPL
432697	2011 BN_{98}	—	October 2, 2006	Mount Lemmon	Mount Lemmon Survey	·	840 m	MPC · JPL
432698	2011 BK_{118}	—	January 15, 2011	Mount Lemmon	Mount Lemmon Survey	·	1.1 km	MPC · JPL
432699	2011 BV_{126}	—	April 3, 2008	Kitt Peak	Spacewatch	·	1.1 km	MPC · JPL
432700	2011 BK_{146}	—	February 4, 2000	Kitt Peak	Spacewatch	·	1.4 km	MPC · JPL

== 432701–432800 ==
back to top

Designation			Discovery			Properties		Ref
Permanent	Provisional	Named after	Date	Site	Discoverer(s)	Category	Diam.	Ref
432701	2011 BA_{155}	—	July 16, 2005	Kitt Peak	Spacewatch	·	1.0 km	MPC · JPL
432702	2011 CG_{6}	—	April 13, 2004	Kitt Peak	Spacewatch	·	1.1 km	MPC · JPL
432703	2011 CC_{7}	—	December 10, 2010	Mount Lemmon	Mount Lemmon Survey	·	1.4 km	MPC · JPL
432704	2011 CH_{7}	—	September 21, 2009	Kitt Peak	Spacewatch	·	1.3 km	MPC · JPL
432705	2011 CL_{8}	—	April 20, 2004	Kitt Peak	Spacewatch	·	1.3 km	MPC · JPL
432706	2011 CW_{8}	—	December 10, 2006	Kitt Peak	Spacewatch	·	950 m	MPC · JPL
432707	2011 CE_{17}	—	July 2, 2005	Kitt Peak	Spacewatch	·	1.2 km	MPC · JPL
432708	2011 CU_{22}	—	February 29, 2000	Socorro	LINEAR	·	1.2 km	MPC · JPL
432709	2011 CY_{24}	—	April 27, 2008	Kitt Peak	Spacewatch	V	660 m	MPC · JPL
432710	2011 CX_{27}	—	March 18, 2004	Socorro	LINEAR	·	1.1 km	MPC · JPL
432711	2011 CO_{29}	—	November 17, 2006	Kitt Peak	Spacewatch	NYS	990 m	MPC · JPL
432712	2011 CA_{30}	—	April 16, 2004	Socorro	LINEAR	·	1.1 km	MPC · JPL
432713	2011 CA_{32}	—	April 5, 2000	Socorro	LINEAR	·	1.1 km	MPC · JPL
432714	2011 CD_{34}	—	December 9, 2010	Mount Lemmon	Mount Lemmon Survey	NYS	890 m	MPC · JPL
432715	2011 CC_{40}	—	January 11, 2011	Kitt Peak	Spacewatch	V	650 m	MPC · JPL
432716	2011 CU_{54}	—	May 9, 2004	Kitt Peak	Spacewatch	·	930 m	MPC · JPL
432717	2011 CW_{60}	—	February 17, 2004	Kitt Peak	Spacewatch	·	890 m	MPC · JPL
432718	2011 CF_{64}	—	February 21, 2007	Kitt Peak	Spacewatch	·	700 m	MPC · JPL
432719	2011 CZ_{64}	—	January 26, 2011	Kitt Peak	Spacewatch	NYS	1.2 km	MPC · JPL
432720	2011 CH_{83}	—	May 1, 2008	Kitt Peak	Spacewatch	·	1.0 km	MPC · JPL
432721	2011 CK_{91}	—	January 28, 2007	Mount Lemmon	Mount Lemmon Survey	·	750 m	MPC · JPL
432722	2011 CX_{91}	—	January 26, 2000	Kitt Peak	Spacewatch	V	640 m	MPC · JPL
432723	2011 CP_{103}	—	February 1, 2006	Kitt Peak	Spacewatch	KOR	1.2 km	MPC · JPL
432724	2011 CN_{105}	—	March 13, 2007	Mount Lemmon	Mount Lemmon Survey	·	1.1 km	MPC · JPL
432725	2011 CN_{110}	—	August 22, 2004	Kitt Peak	Spacewatch	·	1.7 km	MPC · JPL
432726	2011 CY_{110}	—	January 8, 2011	Mount Lemmon	Mount Lemmon Survey	PHO	1.1 km	MPC · JPL
432727	2011 CA_{116}	—	January 9, 2007	Kitt Peak	Spacewatch	SUL	1.6 km	MPC · JPL
432728	2011 DF_{4}	—	October 25, 2009	Mount Lemmon	Mount Lemmon Survey	·	1.6 km	MPC · JPL
432729	2011 DL_{11}	—	December 12, 2006	Socorro	LINEAR	·	1.4 km	MPC · JPL
432730	2011 DC_{12}	—	February 5, 2000	Kitt Peak	Spacewatch	·	860 m	MPC · JPL
432731	2011 DE_{14}	—	February 8, 2000	Kitt Peak	Spacewatch	·	1.0 km	MPC · JPL
432732	2011 DK_{14}	—	September 14, 2005	Kitt Peak	Spacewatch	·	1.1 km	MPC · JPL
432733	2011 DM_{18}	—	February 26, 2011	Kitt Peak	Spacewatch	EUN	1.2 km	MPC · JPL
432734	2011 DQ_{22}	—	February 26, 2011	Kitt Peak	Spacewatch	·	1.1 km	MPC · JPL
432735	2011 DU_{22}	—	November 28, 2005	Kitt Peak	Spacewatch	·	1.5 km	MPC · JPL
432736	2011 DT_{23}	—	January 8, 2011	Mount Lemmon	Mount Lemmon Survey	·	2.0 km	MPC · JPL
432737	2011 DG_{25}	—	September 17, 2006	Kitt Peak	Spacewatch	·	890 m	MPC · JPL
432738	2011 DV_{33}	—	November 21, 2005	Kitt Peak	Spacewatch	NYS	1.3 km	MPC · JPL
432739	2011 DY_{37}	—	October 7, 2005	Kitt Peak	Spacewatch	·	890 m	MPC · JPL
432740	2011 DH_{40}	—	October 22, 2005	Kitt Peak	Spacewatch	V	680 m	MPC · JPL
432741	2011 EU_{3}	—	February 26, 2011	Kitt Peak	Spacewatch	(5)	1.1 km	MPC · JPL
432742	2011 EN_{5}	—	May 9, 2004	Kitt Peak	Spacewatch	MAS	560 m	MPC · JPL
432743	2011 EP_{10}	—	September 25, 2005	Kitt Peak	Spacewatch	·	970 m	MPC · JPL
432744	2011 EF_{13}	—	January 29, 2007	Kitt Peak	Spacewatch	NYS	990 m	MPC · JPL
432745	2011 EU_{16}	—	February 23, 2011	Kitt Peak	Spacewatch	·	1.2 km	MPC · JPL
432746	2011 EY_{22}	—	April 26, 2000	Kitt Peak	Spacewatch	MAS	670 m	MPC · JPL
432747	2011 EY_{23}	—	March 9, 2007	Kitt Peak	Spacewatch	MAR	960 m	MPC · JPL
432748	2011 EA_{24}	—	January 17, 2007	Kitt Peak	Spacewatch	NYS	970 m	MPC · JPL
432749	2011 EC_{30}	—	September 30, 2005	Mount Lemmon	Mount Lemmon Survey	·	1.5 km	MPC · JPL
432750	2011 ED_{31}	—	February 10, 2011	Catalina	CSS	·	2.4 km	MPC · JPL
432751	2011 EW_{52}	—	March 14, 2007	Mount Lemmon	Mount Lemmon Survey	·	2.1 km	MPC · JPL
432752	2011 EH_{56}	—	January 30, 2011	Kitt Peak	Spacewatch	·	1.3 km	MPC · JPL
432753	2011 EX_{65}	—	November 18, 2006	Mount Lemmon	Mount Lemmon Survey	·	1.2 km	MPC · JPL
432754	2011 EP_{68}	—	September 17, 2009	Kitt Peak	Spacewatch	·	990 m	MPC · JPL
432755	2011 EM_{69}	—	September 4, 2008	Kitt Peak	Spacewatch	·	1.8 km	MPC · JPL
432756	2011 EU_{80}	—	January 18, 2010	WISE	WISE	·	1.7 km	MPC · JPL
432757	2011 EG_{84}	—	February 8, 2007	Kitt Peak	Spacewatch	·	1.0 km	MPC · JPL
432758	2011 FD	—	January 29, 2007	Kitt Peak	Spacewatch	·	1.2 km	MPC · JPL
432759	2011 FP_{5}	—	February 16, 2007	Catalina	CSS	·	1.6 km	MPC · JPL
432760	2011 FQ_{7}	—	February 26, 2007	Mount Lemmon	Mount Lemmon Survey	·	1.1 km	MPC · JPL
432761	2011 FX_{8}	—	October 7, 2008	Mount Lemmon	Mount Lemmon Survey	·	1.2 km	MPC · JPL
432762	2011 FY_{8}	—	September 22, 2008	Kitt Peak	Spacewatch	·	1.5 km	MPC · JPL
432763	2011 FQ_{10}	—	October 7, 2005	Kitt Peak	Spacewatch	·	1.5 km	MPC · JPL
432764	2011 FF_{13}	—	March 2, 2011	Kitt Peak	Spacewatch	·	1.2 km	MPC · JPL
432765	2011 FK_{15}	—	September 23, 2008	Mount Lemmon	Mount Lemmon Survey	·	1.0 km	MPC · JPL
432766	2011 FQ_{22}	—	January 28, 2007	Mount Lemmon	Mount Lemmon Survey	·	1.3 km	MPC · JPL
432767	2011 FC_{23}	—	January 27, 2007	Kitt Peak	Spacewatch	·	1.3 km	MPC · JPL
432768	2011 FH_{23}	—	September 6, 2008	Kitt Peak	Spacewatch	·	1.9 km	MPC · JPL
432769	2011 FM_{23}	—	October 8, 2008	Kitt Peak	Spacewatch	·	1.6 km	MPC · JPL
432770	2011 FR_{25}	—	February 2, 2006	Kitt Peak	Spacewatch	·	1.7 km	MPC · JPL
432771	2011 FA_{26}	—	January 15, 2011	Mount Lemmon	Mount Lemmon Survey	·	2.2 km	MPC · JPL
432772	2011 FW_{29}	—	September 4, 2008	Kitt Peak	Spacewatch	·	1.9 km	MPC · JPL
432773	2011 FD_{30}	—	February 25, 2011	Kitt Peak	Spacewatch	·	850 m	MPC · JPL
432774	2011 FM_{31}	—	December 30, 2005	Catalina	CSS	·	1.7 km	MPC · JPL
432775	2011 FC_{32}	—	September 26, 2008	Kitt Peak	Spacewatch	·	1.4 km	MPC · JPL
432776	2011 FW_{32}	—	May 7, 2007	Kitt Peak	Spacewatch	·	1.2 km	MPC · JPL
432777	2011 FK_{34}	—	February 11, 2011	Mount Lemmon	Mount Lemmon Survey	·	880 m	MPC · JPL
432778	2011 FB_{36}	—	October 10, 1999	Socorro	LINEAR	·	2.0 km	MPC · JPL
432779	2011 FY_{44}	—	February 17, 2007	Kitt Peak	Spacewatch	·	1.0 km	MPC · JPL
432780	2011 FE_{47}	—	October 5, 2004	Kitt Peak	Spacewatch	·	1.7 km	MPC · JPL
432781	2011 FK_{54}	—	December 1, 2005	Kitt Peak	Spacewatch	·	1.4 km	MPC · JPL
432782	2011 FY_{59}	—	March 13, 2007	Kitt Peak	Spacewatch	·	890 m	MPC · JPL
432783	2011 FU_{62}	—	March 10, 2007	Kitt Peak	Spacewatch	·	1.1 km	MPC · JPL
432784	2011 FA_{66}	—	March 14, 2007	Kitt Peak	Spacewatch	·	1.1 km	MPC · JPL
432785	2011 FW_{66}	—	December 29, 2005	Kitt Peak	Spacewatch	·	2.3 km	MPC · JPL
432786	2011 FM_{83}	—	April 14, 2007	Kitt Peak	Spacewatch	·	880 m	MPC · JPL
432787	2011 FU_{89}	—	April 24, 2007	Mount Lemmon	Mount Lemmon Survey	·	1.8 km	MPC · JPL
432788	2011 FN_{104}	—	April 11, 2007	Kitt Peak	Spacewatch	·	1.1 km	MPC · JPL
432789	2011 FO_{115}	—	May 9, 2007	Mount Lemmon	Mount Lemmon Survey	ADE	1.4 km	MPC · JPL
432790	2011 FB_{129}	—	March 1, 2011	Mount Lemmon	Mount Lemmon Survey	MAS	710 m	MPC · JPL
432791	2011 FC_{131}	—	March 10, 2007	Kitt Peak	Spacewatch	NYS	1.2 km	MPC · JPL
432792	2011 FY_{131}	—	February 13, 2011	Kitt Peak	Spacewatch	·	2.2 km	MPC · JPL
432793	2011 FJ_{142}	—	March 15, 2007	Mount Lemmon	Mount Lemmon Survey	·	1.5 km	MPC · JPL
432794	2011 FD_{149}	—	March 11, 2011	Kitt Peak	Spacewatch	·	1.7 km	MPC · JPL
432795	2011 FT_{149}	—	November 19, 2009	Kitt Peak	Spacewatch	·	1.2 km	MPC · JPL
432796	2011 FO_{152}	—	October 26, 2009	Kitt Peak	Spacewatch	·	2.0 km	MPC · JPL
432797	2011 GZ	—	October 6, 2008	Kitt Peak	Spacewatch	·	1.6 km	MPC · JPL
432798	2011 GT_{2}	—	December 1, 2005	Mount Lemmon	Mount Lemmon Survey	·	1.6 km	MPC · JPL
432799	2011 GR_{7}	—	March 15, 2010	WISE	WISE	·	3.3 km	MPC · JPL
432800	2011 GE_{13}	—	March 11, 2011	Mount Lemmon	Mount Lemmon Survey	·	2.3 km	MPC · JPL

== 432801–432900 ==
back to top

Designation			Discovery			Properties		Ref
Permanent	Provisional	Named after	Date	Site	Discoverer(s)	Category	Diam.	Ref
432801	2011 GM_{20}	—	November 6, 2005	Kitt Peak	Spacewatch	·	1.4 km	MPC · JPL
432802	2011 GK_{29}	—	February 8, 2011	Mount Lemmon	Mount Lemmon Survey	·	1.9 km	MPC · JPL
432803	2011 GQ_{30}	—	October 14, 2009	Mount Lemmon	Mount Lemmon Survey	·	2.5 km	MPC · JPL
432804	2011 GO_{34}	—	November 21, 2005	Kitt Peak	Spacewatch	·	1.4 km	MPC · JPL
432805	2011 GV_{36}	—	October 4, 2004	Kitt Peak	Spacewatch	·	1.8 km	MPC · JPL
432806	2011 GF_{37}	—	April 1, 2011	Mount Lemmon	Mount Lemmon Survey	·	1.9 km	MPC · JPL
432807	2011 GE_{42}	—	February 1, 2010	WISE	WISE	·	2.6 km	MPC · JPL
432808	2011 GB_{48}	—	March 15, 2007	Kitt Peak	Spacewatch	·	1.7 km	MPC · JPL
432809	2011 GU_{56}	—	April 6, 2011	Mount Lemmon	Mount Lemmon Survey	·	1.3 km	MPC · JPL
432810	2011 GF_{60}	—	December 17, 2009	Kitt Peak	Spacewatch	·	2.7 km	MPC · JPL
432811	2011 GT_{61}	—	October 7, 2004	Kitt Peak	Spacewatch	·	1.9 km	MPC · JPL
432812	2011 GC_{67}	—	February 23, 2007	Catalina	CSS	PHO	1.2 km	MPC · JPL
432813	2011 GT_{67}	—	May 22, 2006	Kitt Peak	Spacewatch	·	2.1 km	MPC · JPL
432814	2011 GV_{70}	—	April 4, 2011	Siding Spring	SSS	·	2.0 km	MPC · JPL
432815	2011 GX_{72}	—	September 2, 2008	Kitt Peak	Spacewatch	·	1.3 km	MPC · JPL
432816	2011 GH_{78}	—	May 24, 2007	Mount Lemmon	Mount Lemmon Survey	·	1.1 km	MPC · JPL
432817	2011 GJ_{81}	—	April 5, 2011	Kitt Peak	Spacewatch	GEF	1.4 km	MPC · JPL
432818	2011 GJ_{82}	—	September 25, 2008	Kitt Peak	Spacewatch	·	2.0 km	MPC · JPL
432819	2011 GW_{82}	—	September 26, 2008	Kitt Peak	Spacewatch	·	1.3 km	MPC · JPL
432820	2011 GX_{82}	—	April 25, 2007	Kitt Peak	Spacewatch	·	1.0 km	MPC · JPL
432821	2011 GU_{83}	—	March 26, 2011	Mount Lemmon	Mount Lemmon Survey	GEF	1.1 km	MPC · JPL
432822	2011 GG_{88}	—	November 11, 2009	Kitt Peak	Spacewatch	·	1.2 km	MPC · JPL
432823	2011 HY_{1}	—	March 2, 2011	Kitt Peak	Spacewatch	SUL	2.6 km	MPC · JPL
432824	2011 HM_{5}	—	January 31, 2006	Mount Lemmon	Mount Lemmon Survey	·	2.0 km	MPC · JPL
432825	2011 HP_{6}	—	March 27, 2011	Kitt Peak	Spacewatch	·	1.7 km	MPC · JPL
432826	2011 HU_{8}	—	January 28, 2011	Mount Lemmon	Mount Lemmon Survey	·	1.8 km	MPC · JPL
432827	2011 HP_{9}	—	September 3, 2007	Catalina	CSS	EOS	2.3 km	MPC · JPL
432828	2011 HQ_{13}	—	September 5, 2008	Kitt Peak	Spacewatch	EUN	1.1 km	MPC · JPL
432829	2011 HR_{13}	—	September 5, 2008	Kitt Peak	Spacewatch	·	1.6 km	MPC · JPL
432830	2011 HT_{15}	—	April 24, 2011	Mount Lemmon	Mount Lemmon Survey	·	1.6 km	MPC · JPL
432831	2011 HH_{17}	—	January 7, 2010	Mount Lemmon	Mount Lemmon Survey	·	1.3 km	MPC · JPL
432832	2011 HK_{19}	—	March 10, 2011	Mount Lemmon	Mount Lemmon Survey	EUN	1.1 km	MPC · JPL
432833	2011 HW_{27}	—	January 8, 2006	Mount Lemmon	Mount Lemmon Survey	EUN	1.5 km	MPC · JPL
432834	2011 HA_{31}	—	October 7, 2008	Mount Lemmon	Mount Lemmon Survey	·	1.6 km	MPC · JPL
432835	2011 HW_{33}	—	December 18, 2003	Socorro	LINEAR	·	3.6 km	MPC · JPL
432836	2011 HM_{34}	—	February 8, 2010	WISE	WISE	·	2.3 km	MPC · JPL
432837	2011 HT_{36}	—	April 22, 2007	Kitt Peak	Spacewatch	·	1.3 km	MPC · JPL
432838	2011 HG_{37}	—	September 28, 2008	Mount Lemmon	Mount Lemmon Survey	·	1.2 km	MPC · JPL
432839	2011 HU_{38}	—	April 20, 2007	Mount Lemmon	Mount Lemmon Survey	·	1.5 km	MPC · JPL
432840	2011 HA_{39}	—	March 26, 2006	Kitt Peak	Spacewatch	·	1.7 km	MPC · JPL
432841	2011 HB_{39}	—	May 16, 2007	Mount Lemmon	Mount Lemmon Survey	·	1.1 km	MPC · JPL
432842	2011 HO_{41}	—	June 7, 2007	Kitt Peak	Spacewatch	·	1.6 km	MPC · JPL
432843	2011 HB_{42}	—	April 27, 2011	Kitt Peak	Spacewatch	·	1.9 km	MPC · JPL
432844	2011 HL_{45}	—	June 16, 2007	Kitt Peak	Spacewatch	·	1.9 km	MPC · JPL
432845	2011 HR_{47}	—	December 17, 2009	Mount Lemmon	Mount Lemmon Survey	(5)	1.4 km	MPC · JPL
432846	2011 HJ_{49}	—	April 25, 2007	Mount Lemmon	Mount Lemmon Survey	·	1.3 km	MPC · JPL
432847	2011 HQ_{52}	—	April 23, 2011	Kitt Peak	Spacewatch	·	1.9 km	MPC · JPL
432848	2011 HQ_{54}	—	October 13, 2007	Mount Lemmon	Mount Lemmon Survey	·	2.1 km	MPC · JPL
432849	2011 HL_{55}	—	April 25, 2007	Kitt Peak	Spacewatch	·	1.4 km	MPC · JPL
432850	2011 HW_{56}	—	November 23, 2009	Kitt Peak	Spacewatch	EUN	1.2 km	MPC · JPL
432851	2011 HZ_{57}	—	January 30, 2006	Kitt Peak	Spacewatch	·	1.9 km	MPC · JPL
432852	2011 HG_{64}	—	November 1, 2008	Mount Lemmon	Mount Lemmon Survey	MRX	970 m	MPC · JPL
432853	2011 HJ_{68}	—	October 21, 1995	Kitt Peak	Spacewatch	·	1.6 km	MPC · JPL
432854	2011 HL_{73}	—	January 16, 2004	Catalina	CSS	·	4.0 km	MPC · JPL
432855	2011 HJ_{75}	—	April 28, 2011	Kitt Peak	Spacewatch	·	2.0 km	MPC · JPL
432856	2011 HF_{76}	—	January 10, 2006	Mount Lemmon	Mount Lemmon Survey	·	1.2 km	MPC · JPL
432857	2011 HH_{76}	—	April 24, 2011	Kitt Peak	Spacewatch	·	1.5 km	MPC · JPL
432858	2011 HB_{77}	—	February 25, 2006	Mount Lemmon	Mount Lemmon Survey	·	1.7 km	MPC · JPL
432859	2011 HP_{78}	—	October 26, 1995	Kitt Peak	Spacewatch	·	1.5 km	MPC · JPL
432860	2011 HN_{80}	—	September 15, 2007	Mount Lemmon	Mount Lemmon Survey	·	1.8 km	MPC · JPL
432861	2011 HX_{80}	—	January 28, 2006	Kitt Peak	Spacewatch	·	2.4 km	MPC · JPL
432862	2011 HV_{81}	—	November 4, 2004	Kitt Peak	Spacewatch	·	1.8 km	MPC · JPL
432863	2011 HO_{87}	—	May 11, 2007	Mount Lemmon	Mount Lemmon Survey	·	1.8 km	MPC · JPL
432864	2011 HD_{88}	—	May 25, 2006	Kitt Peak	Spacewatch	·	1.9 km	MPC · JPL
432865	2011 HX_{95}	—	October 12, 2009	Mount Lemmon	Mount Lemmon Survey	EUN	1.1 km	MPC · JPL
432866	2011 HS_{96}	—	January 25, 2006	Kitt Peak	Spacewatch	·	1.5 km	MPC · JPL
432867	2011 HB_{97}	—	March 15, 2007	Kitt Peak	Spacewatch	·	1.3 km	MPC · JPL
432868	2011 HE_{102}	—	September 7, 2008	Mount Lemmon	Mount Lemmon Survey	·	1.1 km	MPC · JPL
432869	2011 JS_{6}	—	April 2, 2011	Kitt Peak	Spacewatch	·	2.0 km	MPC · JPL
432870	2011 JB_{14}	—	April 24, 2011	Kitt Peak	Spacewatch	·	1.8 km	MPC · JPL
432871	2011 JA_{19}	—	February 27, 2006	Catalina	CSS	·	2.2 km	MPC · JPL
432872	2011 JR_{20}	—	January 28, 2006	Kitt Peak	Spacewatch	·	1.5 km	MPC · JPL
432873	2011 JG_{22}	—	April 28, 2011	Kitt Peak	Spacewatch	·	2.9 km	MPC · JPL
432874	2011 JG_{26}	—	March 9, 2010	WISE	WISE	ADE	1.9 km	MPC · JPL
432875	2011 JT_{29}	—	June 9, 2007	Kitt Peak	Spacewatch	·	1.5 km	MPC · JPL
432876	2011 KR_{4}	—	January 1, 2009	Kitt Peak	Spacewatch	·	3.5 km	MPC · JPL
432877	2011 KL_{8}	—	April 5, 2011	Mount Lemmon	Mount Lemmon Survey	·	1.4 km	MPC · JPL
432878	2011 KT_{9}	—	November 1, 2008	Mount Lemmon	Mount Lemmon Survey	·	2.1 km	MPC · JPL
432879	2011 KP_{25}	—	September 4, 2008	Kitt Peak	Spacewatch	·	1.3 km	MPC · JPL
432880	2011 KV_{25}	—	October 28, 2008	Kitt Peak	Spacewatch	EUN	1.1 km	MPC · JPL
432881	2011 KW_{33}	—	April 5, 2011	Mount Lemmon	Mount Lemmon Survey	·	1.0 km	MPC · JPL
432882	2011 KP_{35}	—	January 31, 2006	Mount Lemmon	Mount Lemmon Survey	·	1.8 km	MPC · JPL
432883	2011 LG_{3}	—	November 7, 2007	Catalina	CSS	·	4.3 km	MPC · JPL
432884	2011 LR_{4}	—	August 8, 2007	Socorro	LINEAR	·	1.8 km	MPC · JPL
432885	2011 LA_{7}	—	February 16, 2010	Mount Lemmon	Mount Lemmon Survey	AGN	1.0 km	MPC · JPL
432886	2011 LS_{8}	—	March 20, 2010	Kitt Peak	Spacewatch	·	3.4 km	MPC · JPL
432887	2011 LJ_{11}	—	March 23, 2006	Catalina	CSS	·	2.9 km	MPC · JPL
432888	2011 LU_{11}	—	September 30, 2003	Kitt Peak	Spacewatch	AGN	1.2 km	MPC · JPL
432889	2011 LR_{13}	—	April 14, 1997	Kitt Peak	Spacewatch	·	2.7 km	MPC · JPL
432890	2011 LM_{15}	—	January 4, 2006	Kitt Peak	Spacewatch	(5)	1.6 km	MPC · JPL
432891	2011 MY_{3}	—	February 4, 2006	Kitt Peak	Spacewatch	·	1.5 km	MPC · JPL
432892	2011 MH_{4}	—	June 27, 2011	Kitt Peak	Spacewatch	·	3.2 km	MPC · JPL
432893	2011 ML_{10}	—	January 30, 2011	Mount Lemmon	Mount Lemmon Survey	·	1.6 km	MPC · JPL
432894	2011 OW_{1}	—	July 3, 2005	Mount Lemmon	Mount Lemmon Survey	·	3.4 km	MPC · JPL
432895	2011 OY_{2}	—	May 9, 2006	Mount Lemmon	Mount Lemmon Survey	DOR	2.5 km	MPC · JPL
432896	2011 OH_{3}	—	February 3, 2009	Mount Lemmon	Mount Lemmon Survey	·	4.5 km	MPC · JPL
432897	2011 OE_{5}	—	January 27, 2006	Mount Lemmon	Mount Lemmon Survey	·	1.8 km	MPC · JPL
432898	2011 OJ_{16}	—	February 1, 2006	Mount Lemmon	Mount Lemmon Survey	·	1.8 km	MPC · JPL
432899	2011 OV_{20}	—	July 23, 2011	Siding Spring	SSS	·	2.5 km	MPC · JPL
432900	2011 OG_{34}	—	May 29, 2010	WISE	WISE	·	2.6 km	MPC · JPL

== 432901–433000 ==
back to top

Designation			Discovery			Properties		Ref
Permanent	Provisional	Named after	Date	Site	Discoverer(s)	Category	Diam.	Ref
432901	2011 OX_{39}	—	December 29, 2008	Kitt Peak	Spacewatch	·	2.6 km	MPC · JPL
432902	2011 OZ_{40}	—	June 11, 2011	Mount Lemmon	Mount Lemmon Survey	·	3.2 km	MPC · JPL
432903	2011 OC_{45}	—	February 3, 2009	Kitt Peak	Spacewatch	·	2.8 km	MPC · JPL
432904	2011 PB_{4}	—	May 30, 2000	Kitt Peak	Spacewatch	·	2.0 km	MPC · JPL
432905	2011 PZ_{14}	—	October 3, 2006	Mount Lemmon	Mount Lemmon Survey	·	2.7 km	MPC · JPL
432906	2011 QA_{3}	—	April 10, 2010	Kitt Peak	Spacewatch	LIX	3.0 km	MPC · JPL
432907	2011 QH_{8}	—	March 23, 2006	Kitt Peak	Spacewatch	·	1.7 km	MPC · JPL
432908	2011 QZ_{17}	—	March 4, 2005	Mount Lemmon	Mount Lemmon Survey	DOR	2.6 km	MPC · JPL
432909	2011 QL_{28}	—	April 15, 2010	Kitt Peak	Spacewatch	LIX	4.4 km	MPC · JPL
432910	2011 QA_{35}	—	December 30, 2007	Kitt Peak	Spacewatch	·	3.7 km	MPC · JPL
432911	2011 QL_{42}	—	August 4, 2010	WISE	WISE	·	4.3 km	MPC · JPL
432912	2011 QG_{49}	—	April 15, 2010	Catalina	CSS	·	2.9 km	MPC · JPL
432913	2011 QO_{61}	—	April 10, 2010	Kitt Peak	Spacewatch	·	3.7 km	MPC · JPL
432914	2011 QP_{92}	—	December 6, 1996	Kitt Peak	Spacewatch	3:2	5.0 km	MPC · JPL
432915	2011 QO_{98}	—	September 30, 2000	Socorro	LINEAR	·	3.9 km	MPC · JPL
432916	2011 RR_{7}	—	March 11, 2008	Kitt Peak	Spacewatch	3:2	4.2 km	MPC · JPL
432917	2011 RX_{15}	—	December 22, 2008	Mount Lemmon	Mount Lemmon Survey	·	4.1 km	MPC · JPL
432918	2011 SG_{18}	—	September 30, 2006	Mount Lemmon	Mount Lemmon Survey	·	3.4 km	MPC · JPL
432919	2011 SZ_{51}	—	March 2, 2010	WISE	WISE	·	5.0 km	MPC · JPL
432920	2011 ST_{63}	—	August 21, 2000	Anderson Mesa	LONEOS	·	3.1 km	MPC · JPL
432921	2011 SB_{110}	—	April 9, 2010	WISE	WISE	T_{j} (2.96) · 3:2	6.7 km	MPC · JPL
432922	2011 SP_{112}	—	October 29, 2000	Kitt Peak	Spacewatch	·	3.3 km	MPC · JPL
432923	2011 SC_{129}	—	April 2, 2009	Kitt Peak	Spacewatch	·	3.2 km	MPC · JPL
432924	2011 SK_{191}	—	April 2, 2005	Mount Lemmon	Mount Lemmon Survey	H	520 m	MPC · JPL
432925	2011 SN_{203}	—	March 29, 2009	Kitt Peak	Spacewatch	·	3.8 km	MPC · JPL
432926	2011 SP_{231}	—	January 28, 2010	WISE	WISE	·	3.2 km	MPC · JPL
432927	2011 SW_{253}	—	November 17, 1995	Kitt Peak	Spacewatch	·	3.1 km	MPC · JPL
432928	2011 SK_{266}	—	July 4, 2005	Mount Lemmon	Mount Lemmon Survey	·	3.0 km	MPC · JPL
432929	2011 SD_{274}	—	July 5, 2005	Kitt Peak	Spacewatch	THM	2.2 km	MPC · JPL
432930	2011 UP_{10}	—	May 10, 2004	Kitt Peak	Spacewatch	·	3.3 km	MPC · JPL
432931	2011 US_{23}	—	May 9, 2010	WISE	WISE	3:2	4.6 km	MPC · JPL
432932	2011 UX_{62}	—	December 17, 2003	Socorro	LINEAR	H	760 m	MPC · JPL
432933	2011 UK_{116}	—	February 2, 2009	Mount Lemmon	Mount Lemmon Survey	·	4.0 km	MPC · JPL
432934	2011 UT_{228}	—	March 29, 2009	Kitt Peak	Spacewatch	·	3.1 km	MPC · JPL
432935	2011 UB_{254}	—	September 24, 2000	Socorro	LINEAR	·	3.3 km	MPC · JPL
432936	2011 UO_{320}	—	November 16, 2000	Kitt Peak	Spacewatch	·	3.0 km	MPC · JPL
432937	2011 UQ_{406}	—	April 9, 2003	Kitt Peak	Spacewatch	CYB	4.2 km	MPC · JPL
432938	2011 WW_{153}	—	September 23, 2008	Catalina	CSS	H	620 m	MPC · JPL
432939	2011 XG_{1}	—	March 13, 2005	Mount Lemmon	Mount Lemmon Survey	H	560 m	MPC · JPL
432940	2012 AY_{12}	—	August 30, 2005	Campo Imperatore	CINEOS	H	670 m	MPC · JPL
432941	2012 CB_{53}	—	November 6, 2005	Catalina	CSS	H	820 m	MPC · JPL
432942	2012 DE_{16}	—	November 3, 2007	Kitt Peak	Spacewatch	·	550 m	MPC · JPL
432943	2012 DG_{33}	—	May 21, 2010	Mount Lemmon	Mount Lemmon Survey	H	670 m	MPC · JPL
432944	2012 DA_{44}	—	March 15, 2007	Mount Lemmon	Mount Lemmon Survey	H	710 m	MPC · JPL
432945	2012 EB_{17}	—	November 20, 2006	Kitt Peak	Spacewatch	·	1.7 km	MPC · JPL
432946	2012 FJ_{28}	—	February 25, 2012	Kitt Peak	Spacewatch	·	720 m	MPC · JPL
432947	2012 GD_{4}	—	September 16, 2003	Kitt Peak	Spacewatch	·	570 m	MPC · JPL
432948	2012 GM_{10}	—	April 29, 2009	Kitt Peak	Spacewatch	·	570 m	MPC · JPL
432949	2012 HH_{2}	—	April 19, 2012	Westfield	T. Vorobjov	res · 4:5	204 km	MPC · JPL
432950	2012 HB_{7}	—	October 20, 2007	Mount Lemmon	Mount Lemmon Survey	·	650 m	MPC · JPL
432951	2012 HV_{17}	—	December 2, 2010	Mount Lemmon	Mount Lemmon Survey	·	790 m	MPC · JPL
432952	2012 HZ_{60}	—	September 26, 2006	Catalina	CSS	·	810 m	MPC · JPL
432953	2012 HN_{64}	—	March 26, 2008	Kitt Peak	Spacewatch	·	790 m	MPC · JPL
432954	2012 HE_{73}	—	September 14, 2006	Catalina	CSS	·	700 m	MPC · JPL
432955	2012 HH_{73}	—	April 20, 2012	Mount Lemmon	Mount Lemmon Survey	·	840 m	MPC · JPL
432956	2012 HA_{82}	—	July 31, 2009	Kitt Peak	Spacewatch	·	590 m	MPC · JPL
432957	2012 JT_{3}	—	April 19, 2012	Kitt Peak	Spacewatch	V	570 m	MPC · JPL
432958	2012 JQ_{5}	—	October 22, 2006	Catalina	CSS	BAP	1.0 km	MPC · JPL
432959	2012 JQ_{20}	—	March 2, 2008	Mount Lemmon	Mount Lemmon Survey	V	760 m	MPC · JPL
432960	2012 JW_{20}	—	March 28, 2012	Mount Lemmon	Mount Lemmon Survey	·	670 m	MPC · JPL
432961	2012 JH_{25}	—	November 19, 1992	Kitt Peak	Spacewatch	PHO	890 m	MPC · JPL
432962	2012 JQ_{26}	—	October 1, 2009	Mount Lemmon	Mount Lemmon Survey	·	1.1 km	MPC · JPL
432963	2012 JO_{28}	—	October 21, 2006	Mount Lemmon	Mount Lemmon Survey	·	960 m	MPC · JPL
432964	2012 JK_{37}	—	April 21, 2012	Mount Lemmon	Mount Lemmon Survey	·	1.0 km	MPC · JPL
432965	2012 JO_{50}	—	October 9, 2005	Kitt Peak	Spacewatch	·	1.6 km	MPC · JPL
432966	2012 JX_{64}	—	October 4, 1999	Socorro	LINEAR	·	750 m	MPC · JPL
432967	2012 KQ_{2}	—	April 15, 2012	Catalina	CSS	·	660 m	MPC · JPL
432968	2012 KU_{14}	—	April 30, 2005	Kitt Peak	Spacewatch	·	720 m	MPC · JPL
432969	2012 KO_{17}	—	May 20, 2012	Mount Lemmon	Mount Lemmon Survey	·	750 m	MPC · JPL
432970	2012 LL_{3}	—	March 29, 2008	Mount Lemmon	Mount Lemmon Survey	·	940 m	MPC · JPL
432971 Loving	2012 LJ_{10}	Loving	February 11, 2010	WISE	WISE	·	1.4 km	MPC · JPL
432972	2012 LS_{10}	—	March 13, 2007	Mount Lemmon	Mount Lemmon Survey	·	1.5 km	MPC · JPL
432973	2012 LQ_{17}	—	May 19, 2012	Mount Lemmon	Mount Lemmon Survey	·	700 m	MPC · JPL
432974	2012 LP_{18}	—	April 29, 2008	Mount Lemmon	Mount Lemmon Survey	PHO	880 m	MPC · JPL
432975	2012 MJ_{10}	—	November 9, 1996	Kitt Peak	Spacewatch	·	750 m	MPC · JPL
432976	2012 MM_{15}	—	February 28, 2008	Mount Lemmon	Mount Lemmon Survey	(2076)	700 m	MPC · JPL
432977	2012 OH	—	January 7, 2010	Mount Lemmon	Mount Lemmon Survey	PHO	1.5 km	MPC · JPL
432978	2012 OX	—	June 12, 2004	Socorro	LINEAR	·	1.9 km	MPC · JPL
432979	2012 PT_{3}	—	October 24, 2008	Kitt Peak	Spacewatch	HOF	2.4 km	MPC · JPL
432980	2012 PB_{4}	—	October 31, 2008	Kitt Peak	Spacewatch	·	1.6 km	MPC · JPL
432981	2012 PT_{7}	—	May 25, 2011	Mount Lemmon	Mount Lemmon Survey	·	2.0 km	MPC · JPL
432982	2012 PT_{11}	—	August 10, 2012	Kitt Peak	Spacewatch	·	2.7 km	MPC · JPL
432983	2012 PL_{12}	—	August 10, 2012	Kitt Peak	Spacewatch	·	2.0 km	MPC · JPL
432984	2012 PX_{12}	—	June 16, 2007	Kitt Peak	Spacewatch	·	2.0 km	MPC · JPL
432985	2012 PL_{13}	—	September 29, 2008	Kitt Peak	Spacewatch	·	1.5 km	MPC · JPL
432986	2012 PU_{13}	—	October 10, 2007	Kitt Peak	Spacewatch	·	2.4 km	MPC · JPL
432987	2012 PA_{15}	—	December 21, 2005	Kitt Peak	Spacewatch	·	1.1 km	MPC · JPL
432988	2012 PW_{16}	—	September 29, 2003	Kitt Peak	Spacewatch	·	1.6 km	MPC · JPL
432989	2012 PH_{24}	—	September 23, 2008	Catalina	CSS	·	2.7 km	MPC · JPL
432990	2012 PC_{29}	—	November 17, 2009	Mount Lemmon	Mount Lemmon Survey	EUN	1.3 km	MPC · JPL
432991	2012 PA_{33}	—	August 13, 2007	XuYi	PMO NEO Survey Program	·	4.2 km	MPC · JPL
432992	2012 PO_{34}	—	April 30, 2004	Kitt Peak	Spacewatch	·	1.4 km	MPC · JPL
432993	2012 PQ_{34}	—	October 8, 2007	Catalina	CSS	·	3.0 km	MPC · JPL
432994	2012 PJ_{38}	—	October 25, 2008	Kitt Peak	Spacewatch	·	1.8 km	MPC · JPL
432995	2012 PN_{41}	—	September 29, 2003	Kitt Peak	Spacewatch	WIT	1.0 km	MPC · JPL
432996	2012 QW_{12}	—	April 13, 2011	Mount Lemmon	Mount Lemmon Survey	·	1.5 km	MPC · JPL
432997	2012 QR_{22}	—	September 19, 2007	Kitt Peak	Spacewatch	·	1.7 km	MPC · JPL
432998	2012 QQ_{23}	—	June 28, 1995	Kitt Peak	Spacewatch	EUN	1.3 km	MPC · JPL
432999	2012 QN_{24}	—	September 15, 2007	Kitt Peak	Spacewatch	·	1.6 km	MPC · JPL
433000	2012 QA_{28}	—	August 24, 2012	Kitt Peak	Spacewatch	·	1.6 km	MPC · JPL

back to top

== Meaning of names ==
As minor planet discoveries are confirmed, they are given a permanent number by the IAU's Minor Planet Center (MPC), and the discoverers can then submit names for them, following the IAU's naming conventions. The list below concerns those minor planets in the specified number-range that have received names, and explains the meanings of those names.

Official naming citations of newly named small Solar System bodies are approved and published in a bulletin by IAU's Working Group for Small Bodies Nomenclature (WGSBN). Before May 2021, citations were published in MPC's Minor Planet Circulars for many decades. Recent citations can also be found on the JPL Small-Body Database (SBDB). Until his death in 2016, German astronomer Lutz D. Schmadel compiled these citations into the Dictionary of Minor Planet Names (DMP) and regularly updated the collection.

Based on Paul Herget's The Names of the Minor Planets, Schmadel also researched the unclear origin of numerous asteroids, most of which had been named prior to World War II. This article incorporates text from this source, which is in the public domain: SBDB New namings may only be added to this list below after official publication as the preannouncement of names is condemned. The WGSBN publishes a comprehensive guideline for the naming rules of non-cometary small Solar System bodies.

Named minor planet	Provisional	This minor planet was named for...	Ref · Catalog
432101 Ngari	2009 AZ_{28}	Ngari (occasionally spelled as Ali), a prefecture in northwest Tibet.	JPL · 432101
432107 Reedspurling	2009 AY_{40}	Reed Spurling, American aerospace engineer and caver.	IAU · 432107
432361 Rakovski	2009 WR_{24}	Georgi Rakovski (1821–1867), a Bulgarian revolutionary and writer and an important figure of the Bulgarian National Revival and resistance against Ottoman rule	JPL · 432361
432971 Loving	2012 LJ_{10}	Mildred (1939–2008) and Richard Loving (1933–1975) married in spite of anti-miscegenation laws. They filed the lawsuit Loving v. Virginia that ultimately succeeded in striking the laws down following a United States Supreme Court ruling in 1967.	JPL · 432971
