= Barata (river) =

Location
- Country: Bulgaria

Physical characteristics
- Source
  - location: Danubian Plain
  - coordinates: 43°22′30″N 25°14′30.12″E
  - elevation: 134 m (440 ft)
- Mouth
  - location: Danube
  - coordinates: 43°37′33.96″N 25°20′21.12″E
  - elevation: 22 m (72 ft)
- Length: 39 km (24 mi)

Basin features
- Progression: Danube→ Black Sea

The Barata (Bulgarian: Барата) is a river in northern Bulgaria, a right tributary of the Danube. Its length is 39 km.

The river takes its source at an altitude of 134 m near the village of Chervena. It flows north through the Danubian Plain in a wide valley. Downstream of the village of Oresh the Barata enters the Svishtov–Belene Plain, where it is bifurcated in two large canals, from which numerous other branch out to the north, west and east. The left canal flow north and northwest and does not reach the Danube. The right canal flows into the Danube at an altitude of 22 m near the railway station of Svishtov.

The Barata flows entirely in Veliko Tarnovo Province. There are five settlements along its course, the villages of Chervena, Ovcha Mogila, Dragomirovo and Oresh, as well as the town of Svishtov, all of them in Svishtov Municipality. It waters are utilized for irrigation.

A 14 km stretch of the second class II-52 road Nikopol–Svishtov–Ruse runs along its right bank between Oresh and Svishtov. Along the river valley passes a section of railway line Levski–Belene–Svishtov served by the Bulgarian State Railways.
