= Mitov =

Mitov (Bulgarian: Митов) is a Bulgarian masculine surname, its feminine counterpart is Mitova. It may refer to:

- Anton Mitov (1862–1930), Bulgarian painter, art critic and art historian
- Daniel Mitov (born 1977), Bulgarian politician and Minister of Foreign Affairs
- David Mitov Nilsson (born 1991), Macedonian-Swedish football player
- Dobromir Mitov (born 1972), Bulgarian football coach and former defender
- Georgi Mitov (1875–1900), Bulgarian painter, brother of Anton
- Hristo Mitov (born 1985), Bulgarian football goalkeeper
- Nikolay Mitov (born 1972), Bulgarian football player
- Silviya Mitova (born 1976), Bulgarian Olympic artistic gymnast
- Veli Mitova, Bulgarian-South African philosopher
- Zorica Mitov (born 1988), Serbian basketball player
