= Kozlovets =

Bulgarian village

Kozlovets Козловец
- Village
- Location within Bulgaria
- Coordinates: 43°30′30″N 25°21′47″E
- Country: Bulgaria
- Province: Veliko Tarnovo
- Municipality: Svishtov

Government
  - Mayor: Boris Velev

Area
  - Total: 60,955 km^{2} (23,535 sq mi)
- Elevation: 174 m (571 ft)

Population (2024)
  - Total: 819
- Time zone: UTC+2 (EET)
  - Summer (DST): UTC+3 (EEST)
- Post code: 5290
- Area code: 06325

Kozlovets (Bulgarian: Козловец) is a village in Veliko Tarnovo Province, north-central Bulgaria.

== Geography ==
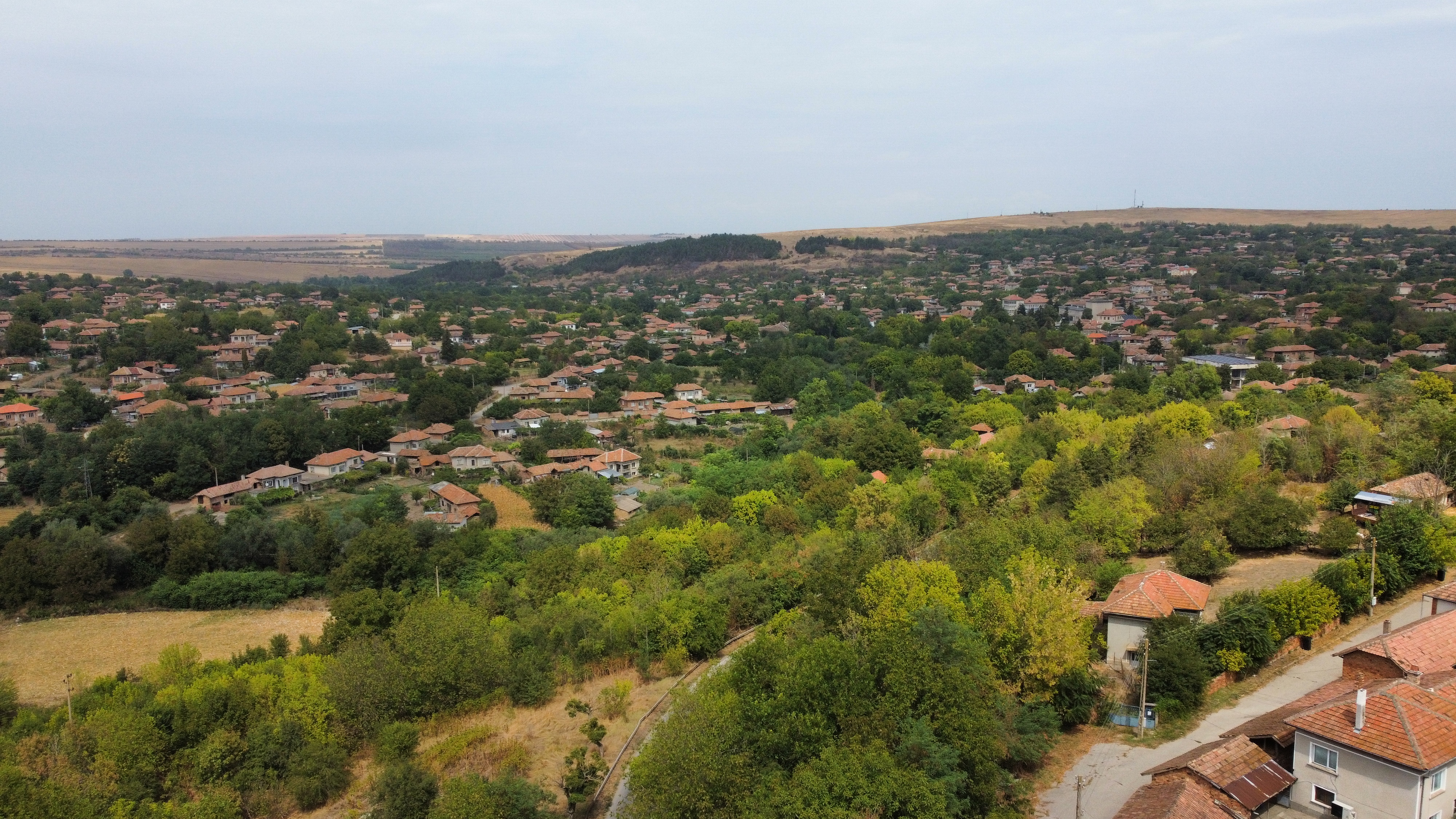
Kozlovets

Kozlovets is located in the central part of the Danubian Plain. The village is 16 km (9.9 mi) south from Svishtov, which sits on the right bank of the River Danube and the border with Romania.

The localities around the village include Savova bara, Sovata, Bashlachuka, Gidelika.

The population of the village has fallen significantly since the end of World War II. In 1946 the population was 4337, in 1985 it was 2492, by December 2024 it was down to 819 people.

== History ==
The village was first mentioned in Turkish documents from 1632 under the name Isliva. The church "St. Dimitar" was built in 1887. Educational work began in the village with the opening of the "Stambolov" school on November 15, 1892. A very well-preserved bronze statuette of Jupiter was discovered near the village.

== Sport ==
- The FC Kozlovets football team has won tournaments in Veliko Tarnovo Province - South in: 1974/1975, 1980/1981, 1981/1982, 1985/1986, 1986/1987, 2017/2018, 2018/2019, 2021/2022.
- FC Zemedelets-93 was established in the 1993. The club played football in Veliko Tarnovo`s Regional league. The team has won tournaments in Veliko Tarnovo Province - South in : 2017/2018, 2018/2019, 2021/2022.

== Economy ==
The local agriculture cooperative Zemedelec 93 was the leader in the Veliko Tarnovo region in 2010. It cultivates 9,000 acres of wheat, 6,000 acres of corn and sunflower, as well as 3,500 acres of rapeseed.

== Gallery ==
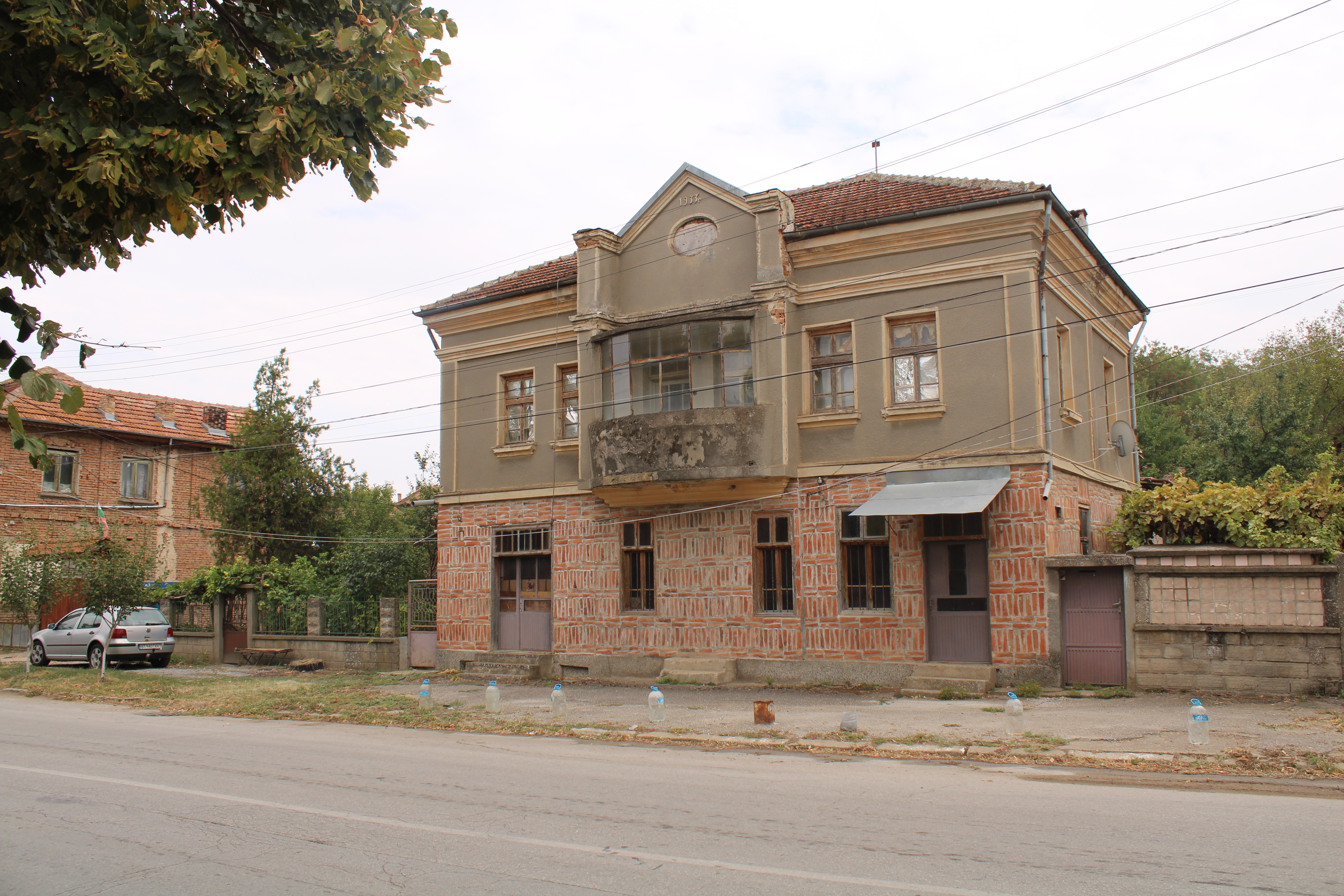
Old house in Kozlovets, Bulgaria

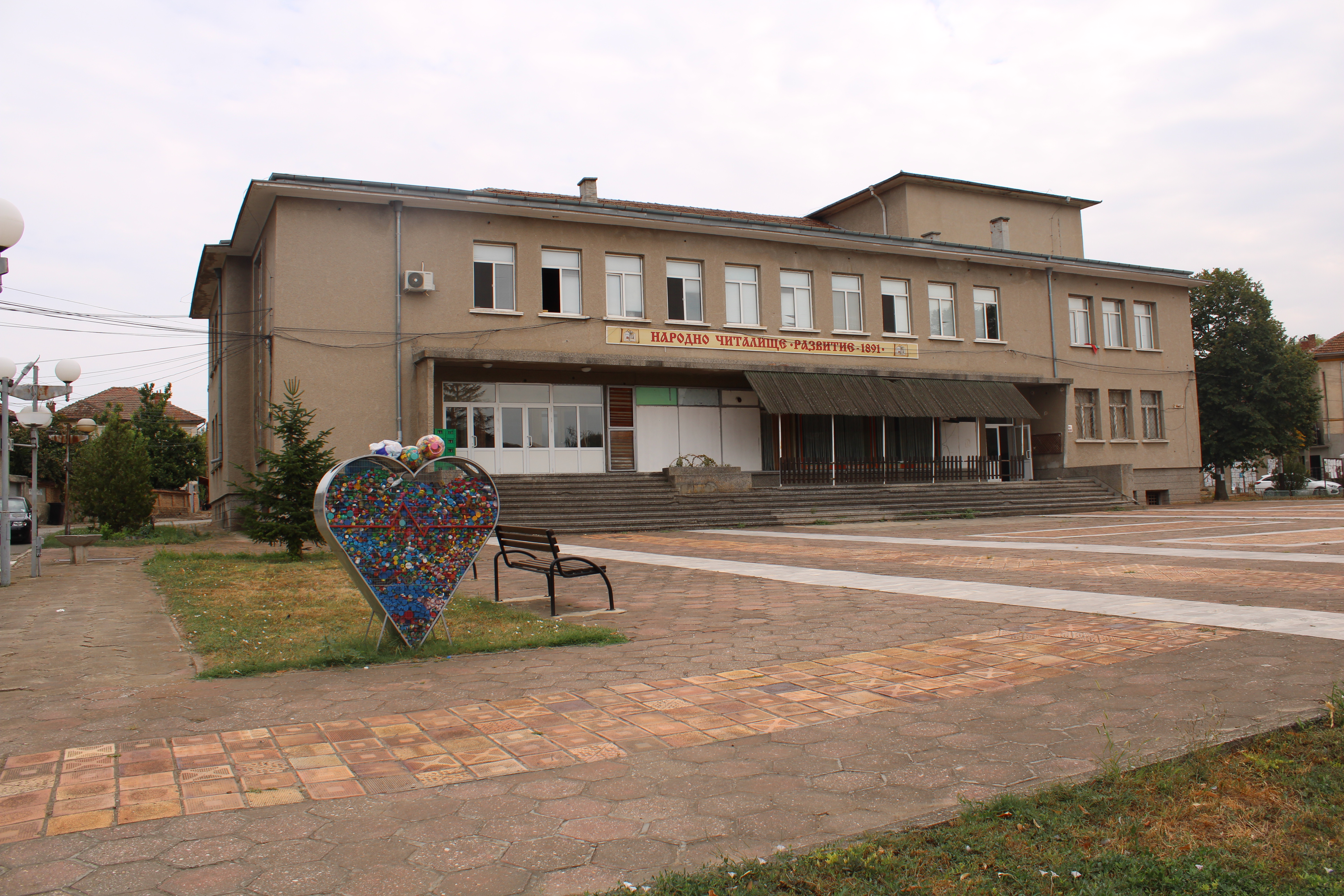
Culture center in Kozlovets

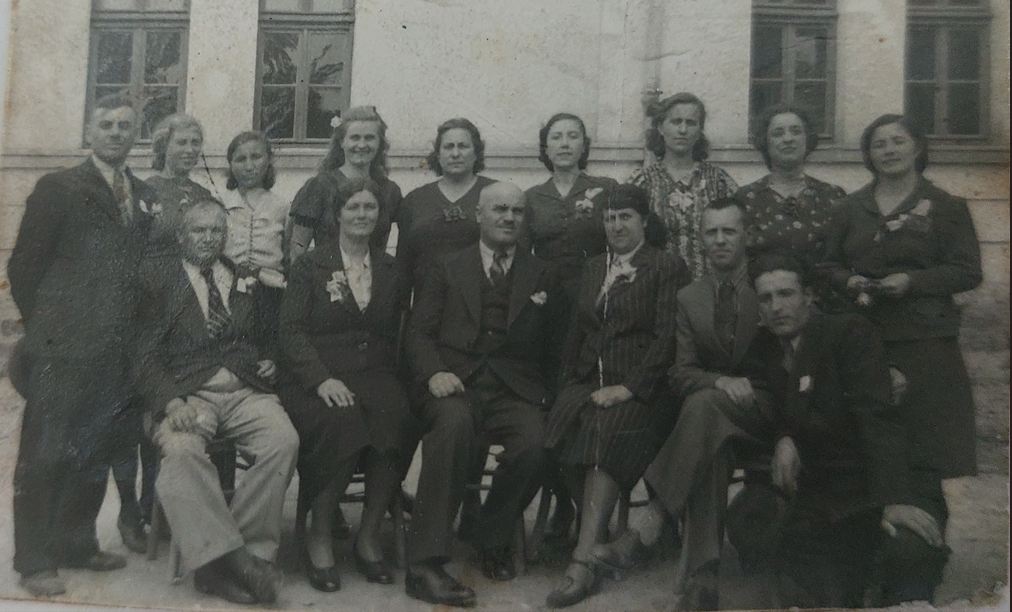
Teachers from Kozlovets

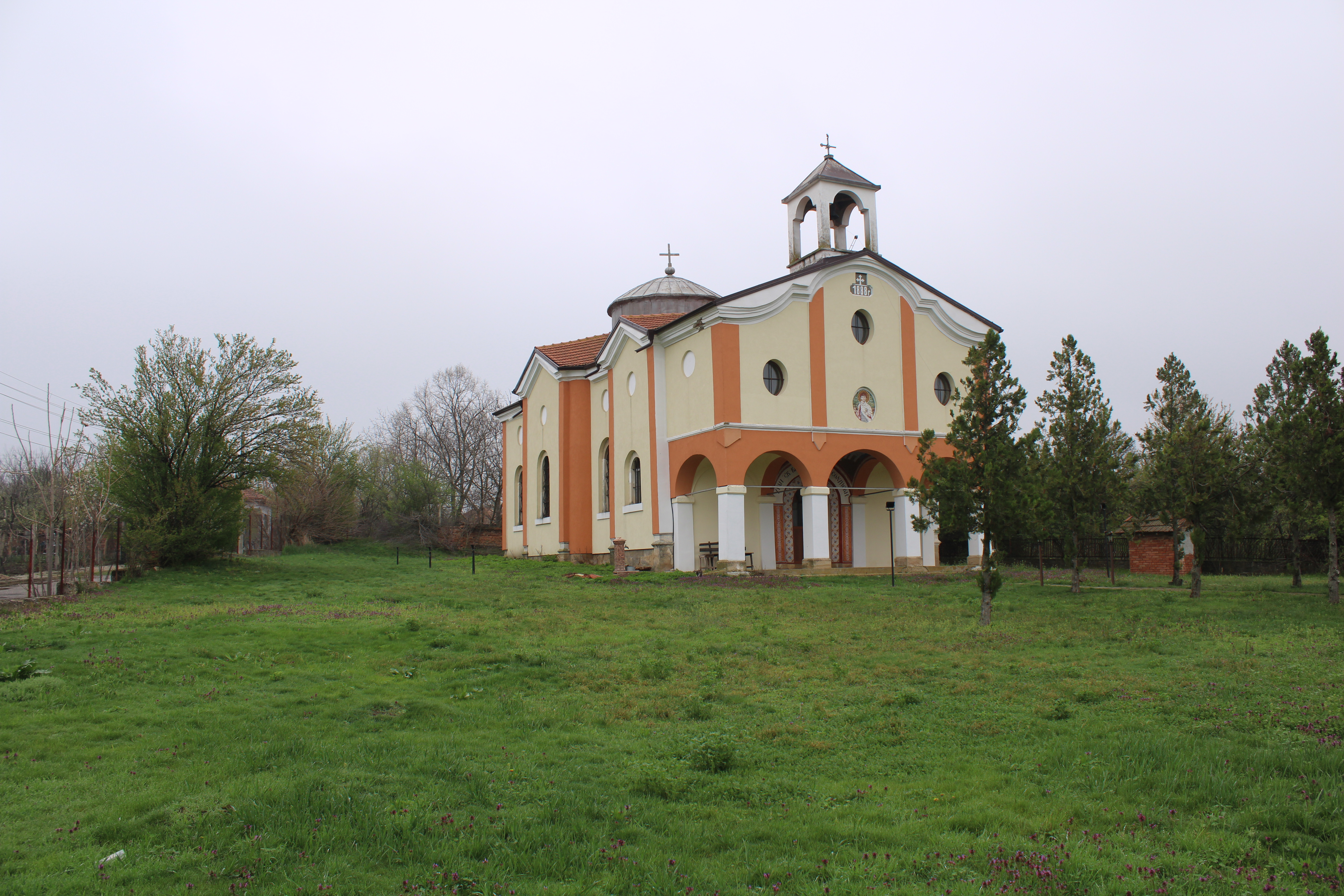
Church in Kozlovets

== Sources ==
- Иван Костов "Козловец"
- Карта на Електрификацията на Търновски окръг, дарена от Цоньо Герганов
- Любен Маринов "Българско Сливово" Издателство "ПИК" 1995 г.
