= Georgi Mitov =

Bulgarian painter

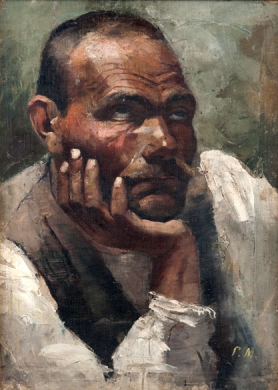
Male Head

Georgi Mitov (Bulgarian: Георги Митов; 14 September 1875, Stara Zagora – 20 August 1900, Plovdiv) was a Bulgarian painter.

== Biography ==
When he was only two, Ottoman troops burned his hometown and massacred over 14,000 people, forcing his family to flee to Svishtov. His childhood was marked by poverty and frequent illnesses. In 1889, he went to study in Plovdiv, then in Tarnovo. He later moved to Varna where he took lessons from Petko Klisurov and his own older brother Anton.

Shortly thereafter, he and a friend went to Florence, where they met up with other painters from their hometown region, proceeding to Turin and studying with Giacomo Grosso at the Accademia Albertina. While there, his paintings won several awards. In 1896, his mother became seriously ill and he returned to Bulgaria. He soon began painting landscapes in the vicinity of Kazanlak.

After only a few months, he went back to Turin. In 1897, he created a series of portraits and nudes, including the "Lucrezia Romana", which was the first popular Bulgarian painting in that genre. He graduated from the Academy with honors and was awarded a gold medal.

At the end of 1898, he returned home in ill health. After spending the summer in Kazanlak, he sought a healthier climate and took a position as a drawing teacher at the Aprilov National High School in Gabrovo. There, he introduced the practice of painting plaster models. It soon became clear, however, that he was suffering from tuberculosis. Despite this, he accepted a new teaching position in Plovdiv, but was virtually bedridden by the end of 1899. He died shortly after receiving notice that his portrait of Dragan Danailov had been accepted for the Paris Exhibition.

== Other selected works ==
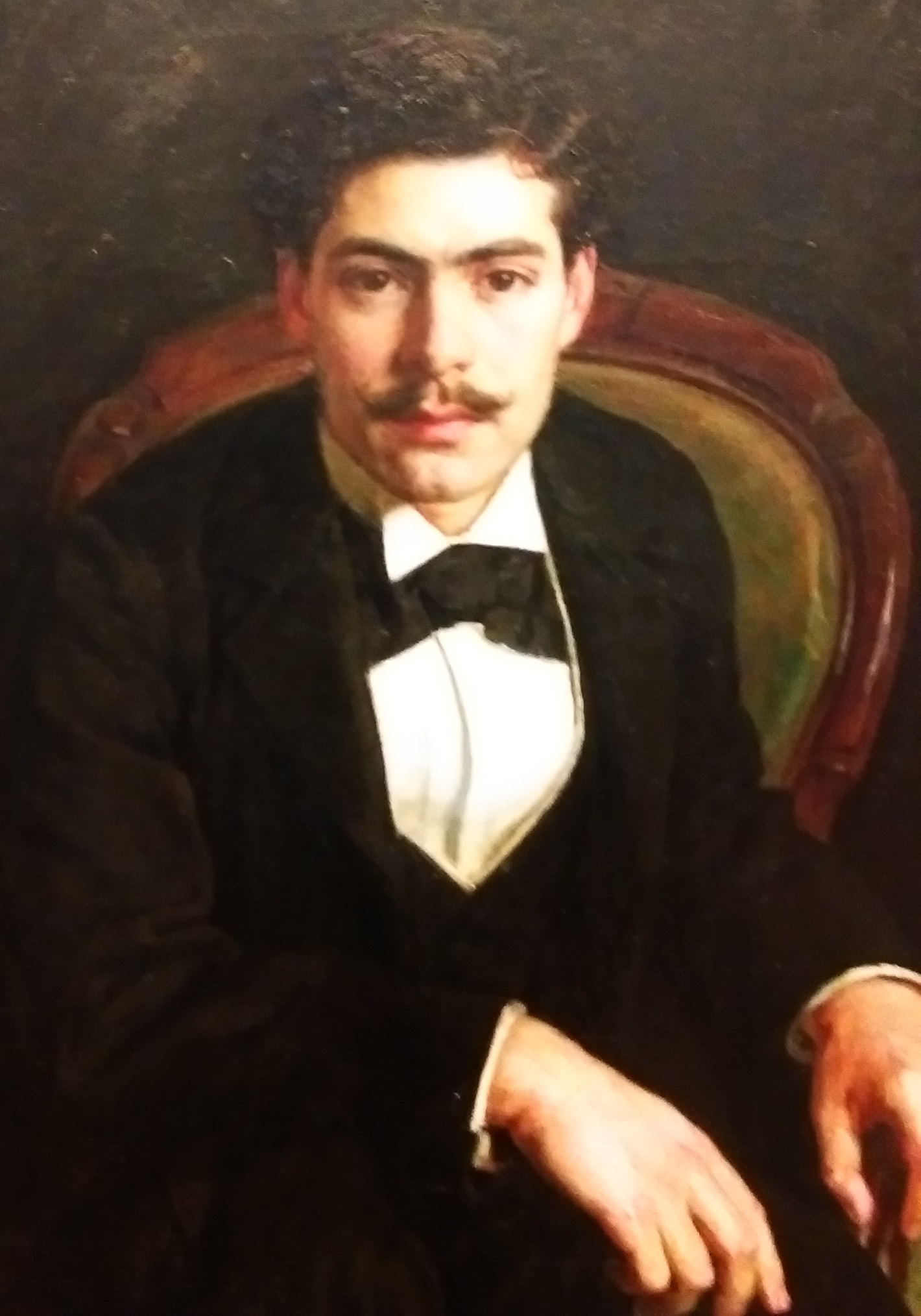
Portrait of
Dragan Danailov

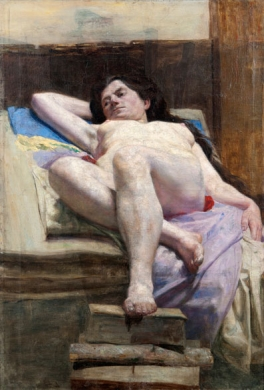
Nude Female Figure, Lying Down

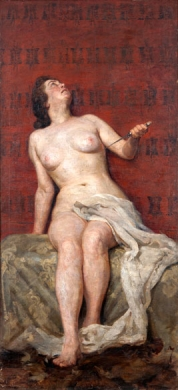
Lucrezia Romana

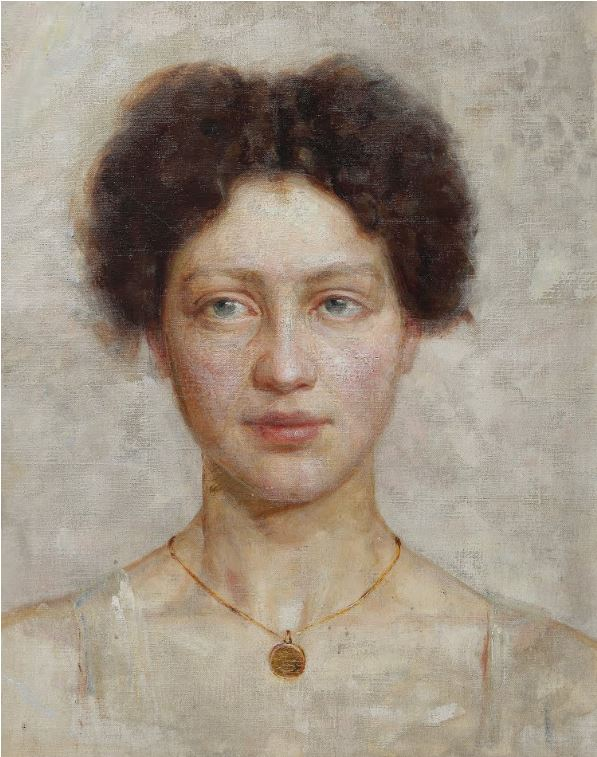
Portrait of an Italian Woman

== Sources ==
- Dimiter Genchev, "Без Митови няма арт-елит", (Without the Mitovs, no Art Elite), in Standart, 9 August 2013
- Bistra Rangelova, Българската живопис от 1878 до 1944 (Bulgarian painting), National Art Gallery (Bulgaria) 1980
- Marin Dobrev, Художниците на Стара Загора (The Artists of Stara Zagora), Дъга (2007) ISBN 954-93872-3-2
