= Hadzhidimitrovo (village) =

Hadzhidimitrovo Хаджидимитрово
- Village
- Location within Bulgaria
- Coordinates: 43°27′25″N 25°18′00″E
- Country: Bulgaria
- Province: Veliko Tarnovo
- Community: Svishtov

Government
  - Mayor: Gencho Genchev

Area
  - Total: 46,551 km^{2} (17,973 sq mi)
- Elevation: 720 m (2,360 ft)

Population (2010)
  - Total: 430
  - Density: 0.0092/km^{2} (0.024/sq mi)
- Time zone: UTC+2 (EET)
  - Summer (DST): UTC+3 (EEST)
- Post code: 5287
- Area code: 063203

Hadzhidimitrovo is a village in North Bulgaria in the Oblast Veliko Tarnovo.

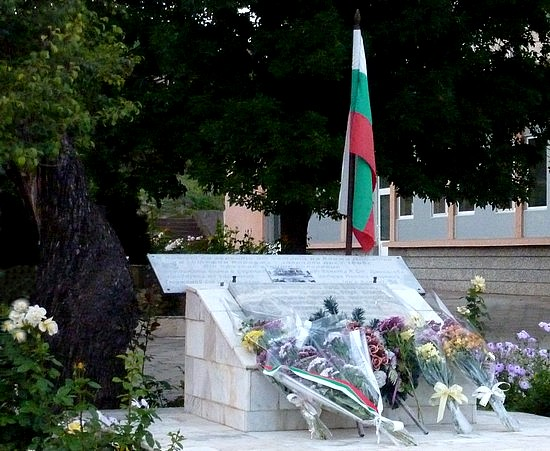
Hadzhidimitrovo monument

== Geography ==
The village is 18 km away from Svishtov. It is located to the hill Deli Asan.

=== Flora and fauna ===
In the area of the village the plant species Serratula bulgarica and sea pink bulgarica are occurring only in this area.

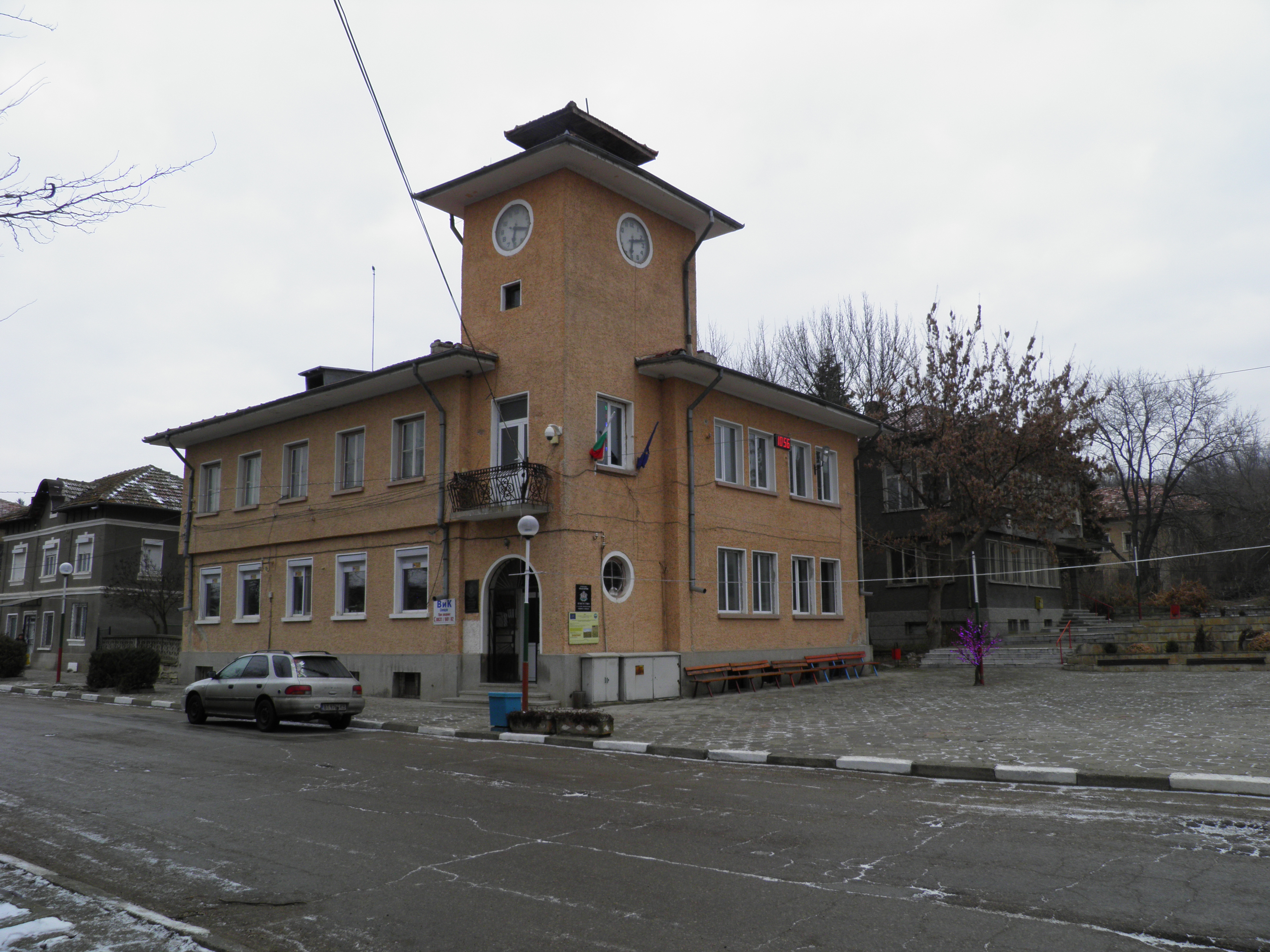
Town hall

== History ==
The village was established in the 16th century. The original name of the village was Syar-ir. Since the 16th century in the village developed beekeeping. The first monastery school was established in 1810 from pop Istat. The Orthodox Church Saint "Archangel Michael" was built in 1862.

In 1876 the detachment of Hadzhi Dimitar and Stefan Karadzha passed through the village. The warriors stopped and lit the Bulgarian flag in the Church. Due to this event the village was renamed from Syar-ir to Hadzhidimitrovo. In 1903 in Hadzhidimitrovo began to publish newspaper"Narodna volya"(People will). The first-agricultural credit cooperative "Nadezhda" was created in 1905. In the village in 1926 is based Heroic Company "Stefan Karadzha".

== Religion ==
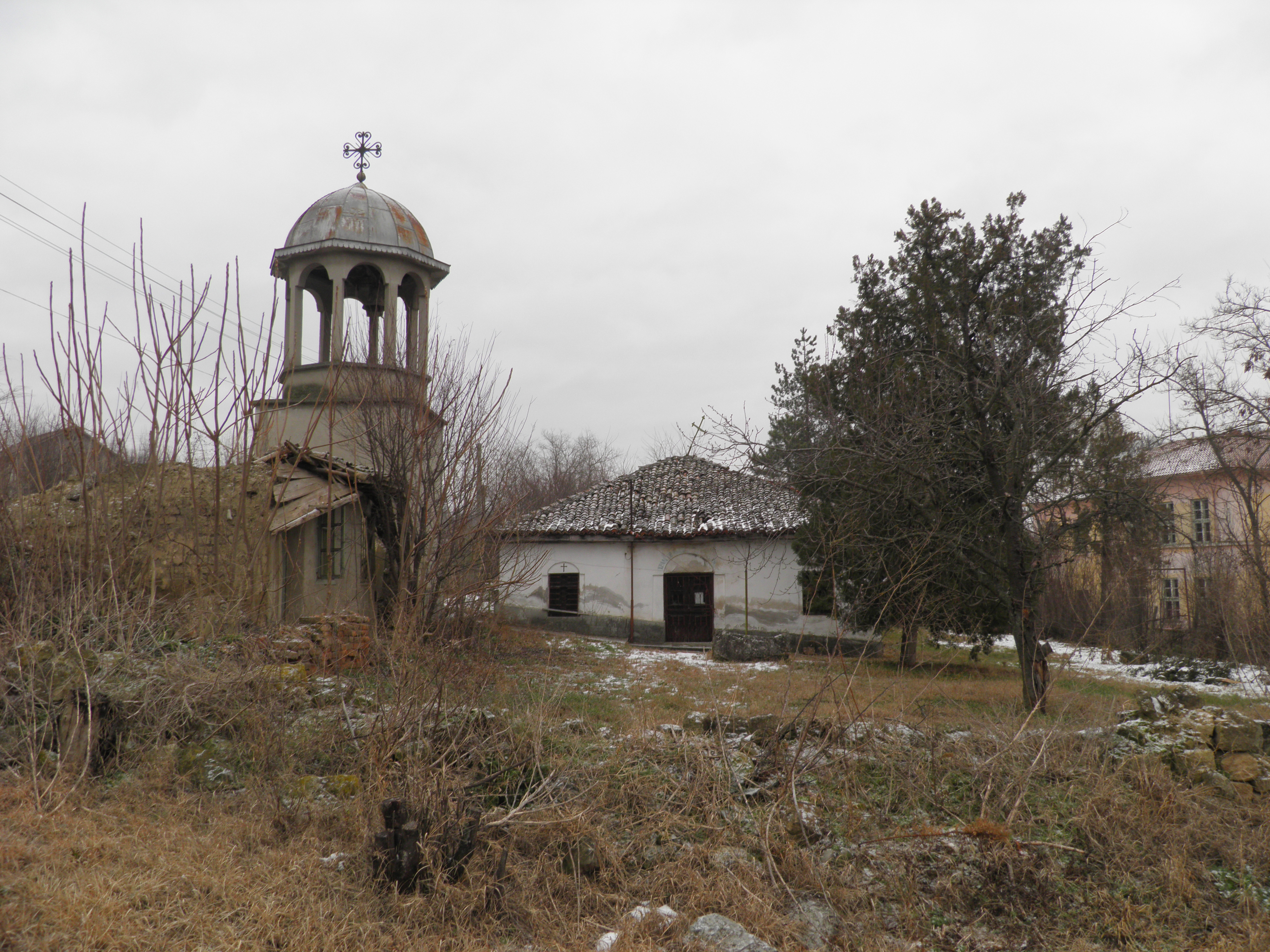
Orthodox Church "St. Archangel Michael "

Orthodox Church "St. Archangel Michael" were built in 1862. Ktitors (donors) and builders for the church were: Nicola Popnikolov Simeon Mitev, Liko Getsov Todor Radev and Mincho Kolev.The first monk in the church were priest Evstatuiy. Jere Ilarion Shishkov was a priest from the beginning of the century to 1957.

== Education ==
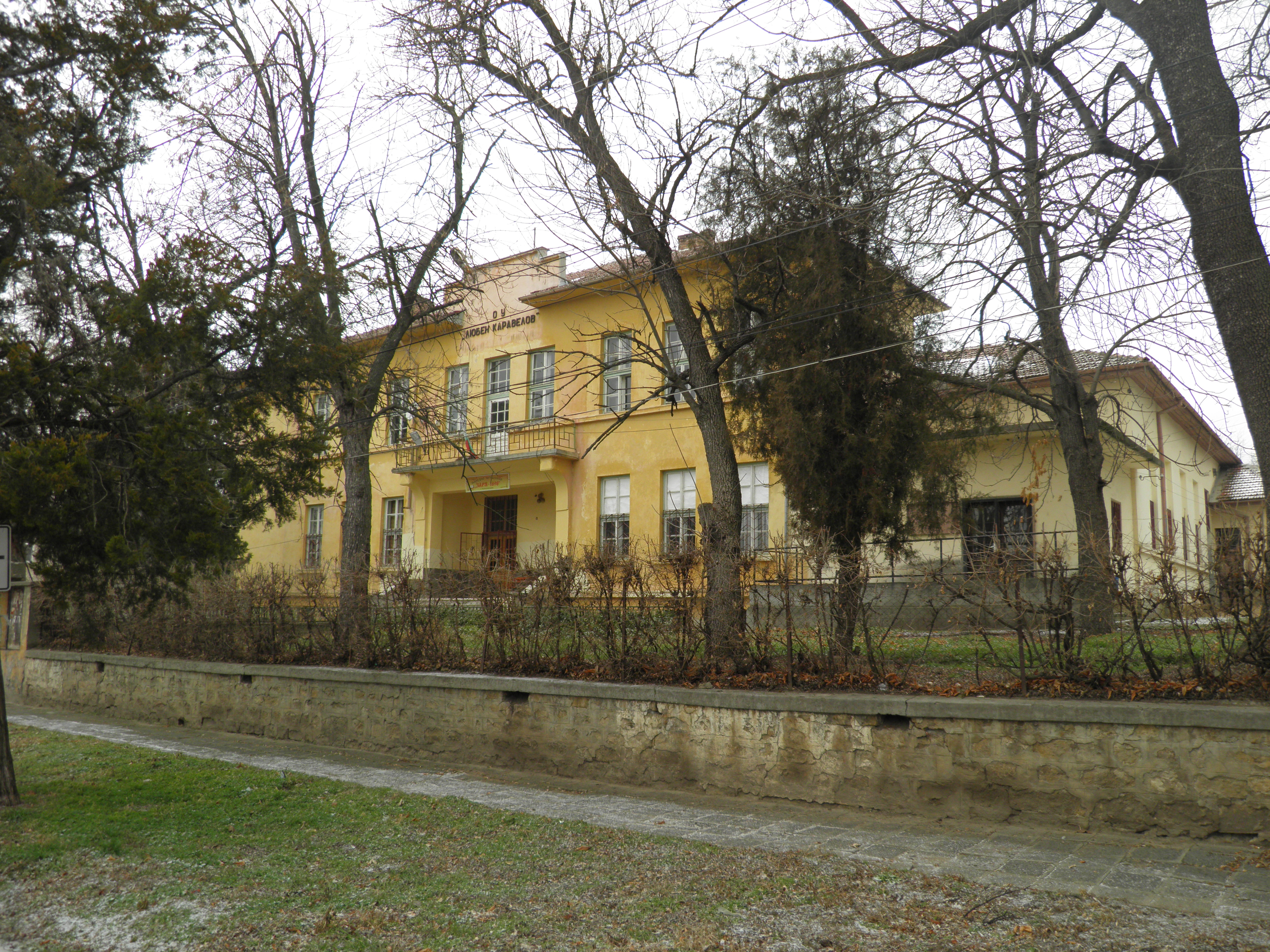

The first monastery school in the village were founded in 1810. Istat is the first teacher in the village. The school was built in 1929.
