= Cesare Ciani =

Italian painter (1854–1925)

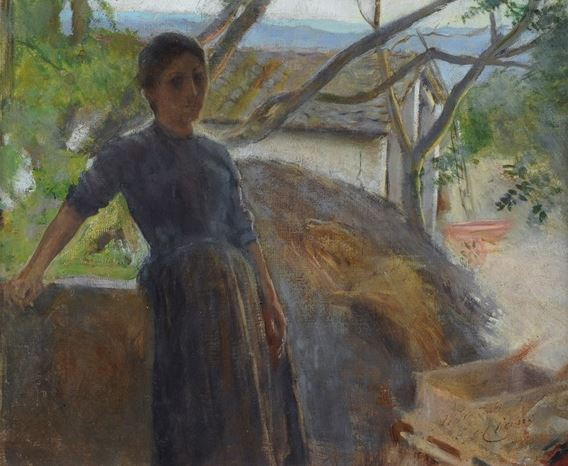
Peasant Woman (The Farmer's Wife)

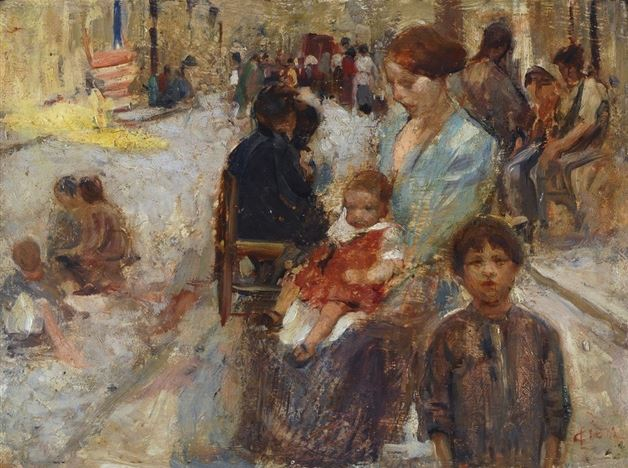
Street Scene, San Frediano

Cesare Ciani (28 February 1854 – 13 February 1925) was an Italian painter.

== Life and work ==
He iwas born in Florence. He initially studied at the Technical Institute, then served in the Army for three years. It wasn't until 1878, at the age of twenty-four, that he entered the Accademia di Belar Arti, where he studied painting with Giuseppe Ciaranfi and Giovanni Fattori. The latter was very influential in terms of Ciani's choice of subjects for his works; portraits and landscapes with figures.

In 1888, he presented his painting "The Widow" at the Circolo degli Artisti and, the following year, it received honorable mention at the Exposition Universelle in Paris. This was the beginning of his regular participation in art exhibitions and gallery shows.

By the turn of the century his works had taken on a more urban quality, reminiscent of Lovis Corinth, with a focus on workers. His landscapes also became brighter and his brushstrokes more fluid. In 1922, he participated in the "Primaverile Fiorentina" (Florentine Spring), presenting a series of paintings on rural and popular subjects, many of which depicted the old and crowded Florentine district of Borgo San Frediano; done in a Post-Macchiaioli style.

His paintings sold very well during his lifetime. Ciani died in 1925 in Florence. Two years after his death, the art critic Mario Tinti and the painter Llewelyn Lloyd organized a major retrospective, with over 180 of his works.

== Sources ==
- Jolanda Pelagatti, Renato Tassi, I Postmacchiaioli, Centro Editoriale Arte e Turismo, 1962, pp. 121–142
- Giampaolo Daddi, Una Raccolta privata di pittura toscana dell'Ottocento, Oggiorno 1984, pp. 49–50
