= Giuseppe Ciaranfi =

Italian painter (1838–1902)

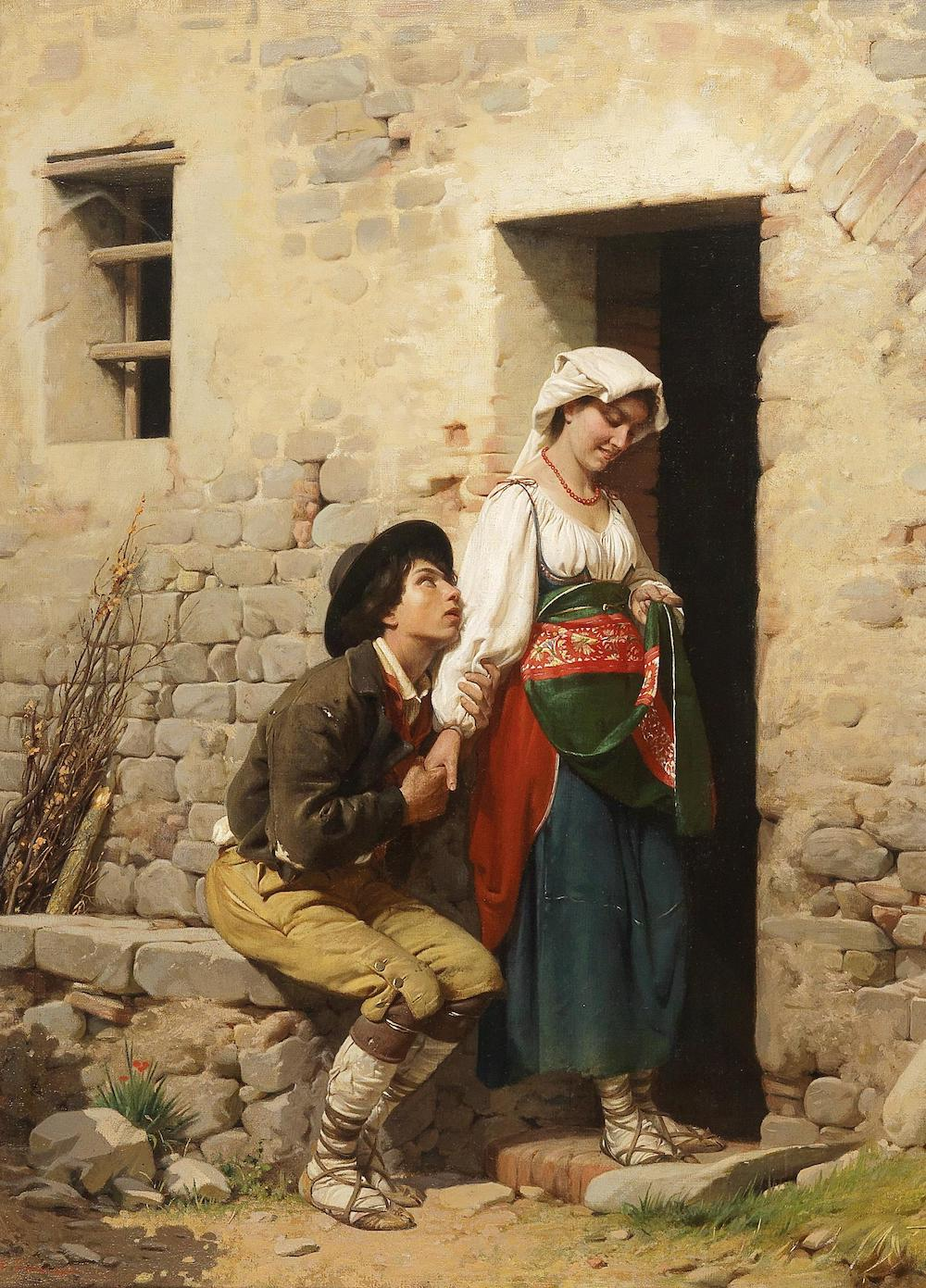
A Declaration of Love

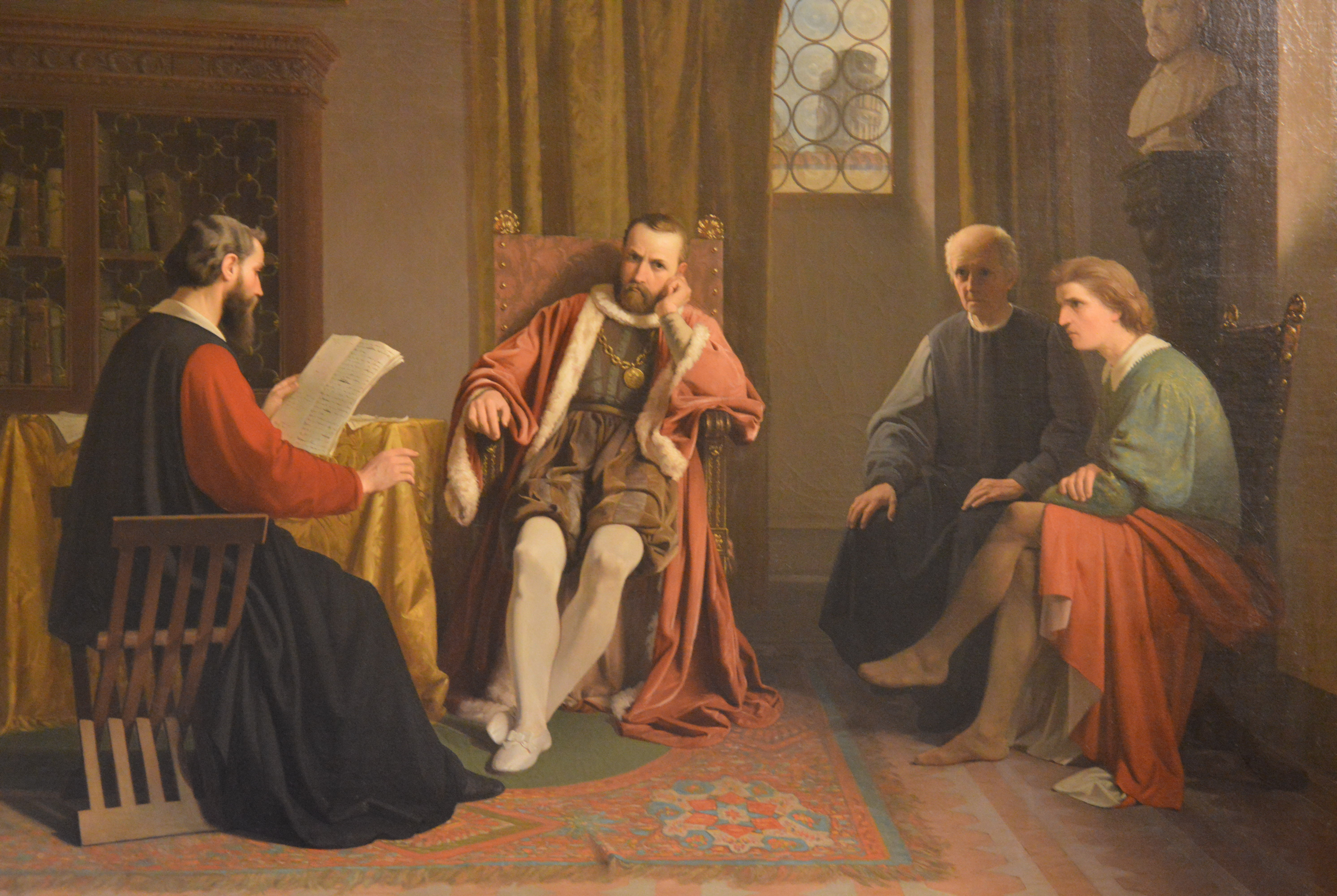
Benedetto Varchi Reads His Storia Fiorentina to Cosimo I

Giuseppe Ciaranfi (1838, Pistoia - 18 January 1902, Florence) was an Italian history and genre painter.

== Biography ==
He initially studied with Enrico Pollastrini in Florence. In 1859, he was admitted to the nude figure lessons at the Accademia di Belle Arti. Three years later, he made his debut with a work depicting Benedetto Varchi, discussing Florentine history with Cosimo I de' Medici, Grand Duke of Tuscany. Together with other painters and men of letters, he frequented the cultural salons held at the home of the architect Francesco Bartolini and his wife, the Irish-born poet Louisa Grace Bartolini, who was also an artist.

In 1866, King Victor Emmanuel II commissioned him to create a tableau showing King Victor Amadeus II of Sardinia helping the poor. In 1875, he presented a scene from the life of Saint Joseph in Bologna. In 1892, he created a popular portrait of Savonarola and, in 1901, he participated in the eighth International Art Exhibition at the Glaspalast in Munich.

From 1876, he occupied the Chair of Painting at the Accademia. His students there included Cesare Ciani, Alfredo Müller, Cesare Laurenti and Angiolo Tommasi, as well as the Bulgarian artists, Anton Mitov and Petko Klisurov.
