= Cesare Laurenti (painter) =

Italian painter

Cesare Laurenti (November 6, 1854 – 1936) was an Italian painter.

== Biography ==
Laurenti was born in Mesola, Ferrara. He moved to Padua at the age of 18 to work as an engraver under the guidance of the sculptor Luigi Ceccon. He was supported by the Count Leopoldo Ferri in this regard, and was able to meet the art critic Pietro Selvatica. In 1875, he married Annina Levi. In 1876, he moved to continue his training at the Accademia di Belli Arti in Florence. He arrived in Florence in 1876, and trained under Giuseppe Ciaranfi. He moved to Naples two years later and worked under Domenico Morelli. Having returned to Padua in 1881, he finally settled in Venice.

After early works of genre painting, he developed a personal approach aimed at expressing the range of human feelings through intense female figures. He painted in oil, pastels, and watercolors. In 1883, at a Rome exhibition, he displayed After the Journey (pastel); Trai fiori; and A priest. At the National Exposition of Venice, he displayed a pastel portrait; In Pescheria; and a painting titled Frons Animi Interpres. A paraphrase of Luigi Chirtani's comments notes: Women kneeling in pews, one likely young, a hiding face in praying hands, the other old, sits next with reckless and provocative expression.

The awards Laurenti won include the Prince Umberto Prize at the first Milan Triennale in 1891. The new century saw a change in style, as the artist began treating Symbolist themes and further developed the study of Renaissance art commenced during his Florentine period, now under the influence of Art Nouveau. He took part in the Venice Biennale on a regular basis from 1895 to 1909, with a solo show of his work in 1907. A highly respected decorator and architect, he designed the new fish market at the Rialto, inaugurated in 1908, and produced some of the sculptural elements himself.

Laurenti died in Venice in 1936.

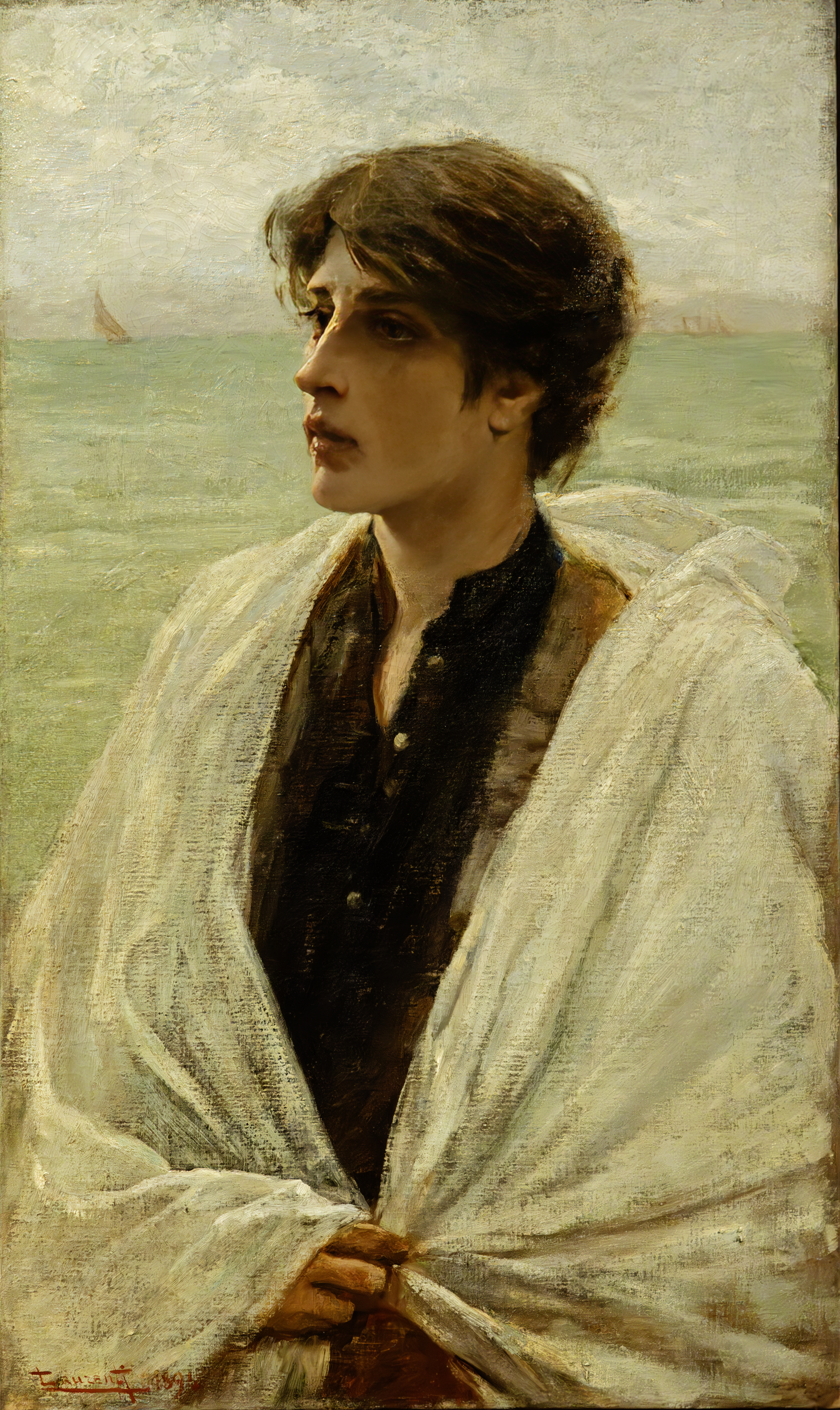
La chioggiotta, 1894

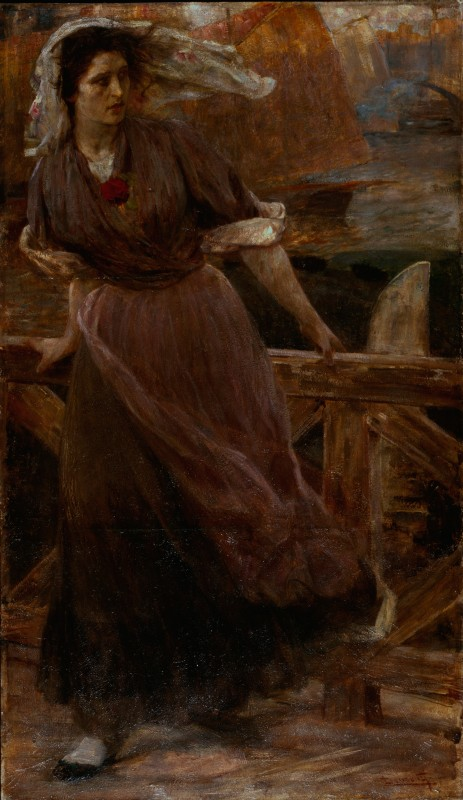
La meraviglia in attesa, 1891-1897 (Fondazione Cariplo)

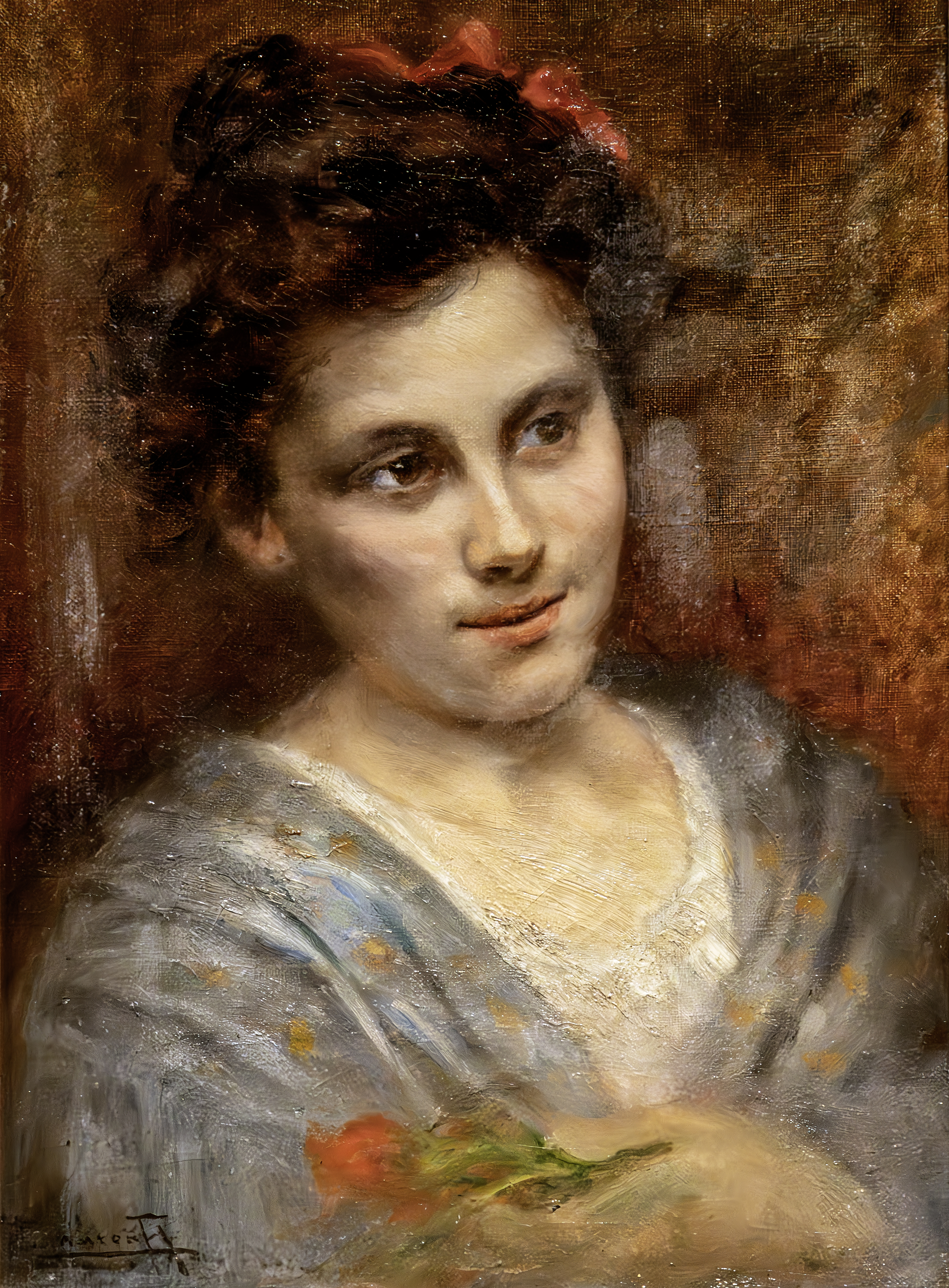
Ritratto di modella, ca 1900, Private collection

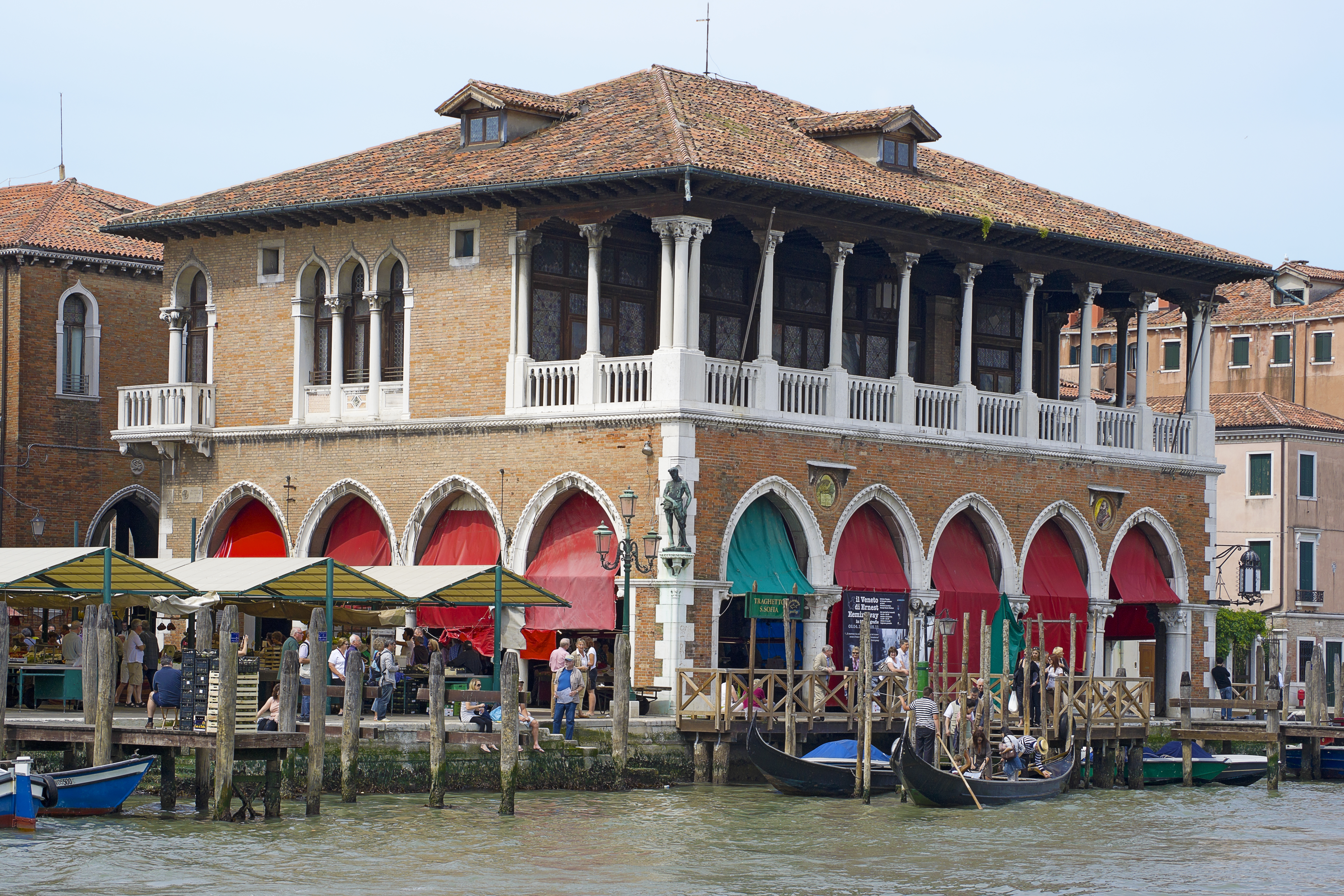
Pescaria (Gothic Revival, 1908)

== Other projects ==
Media related to Cesare Laurenti at Wikimedia Commons
