= Anton Mitov =

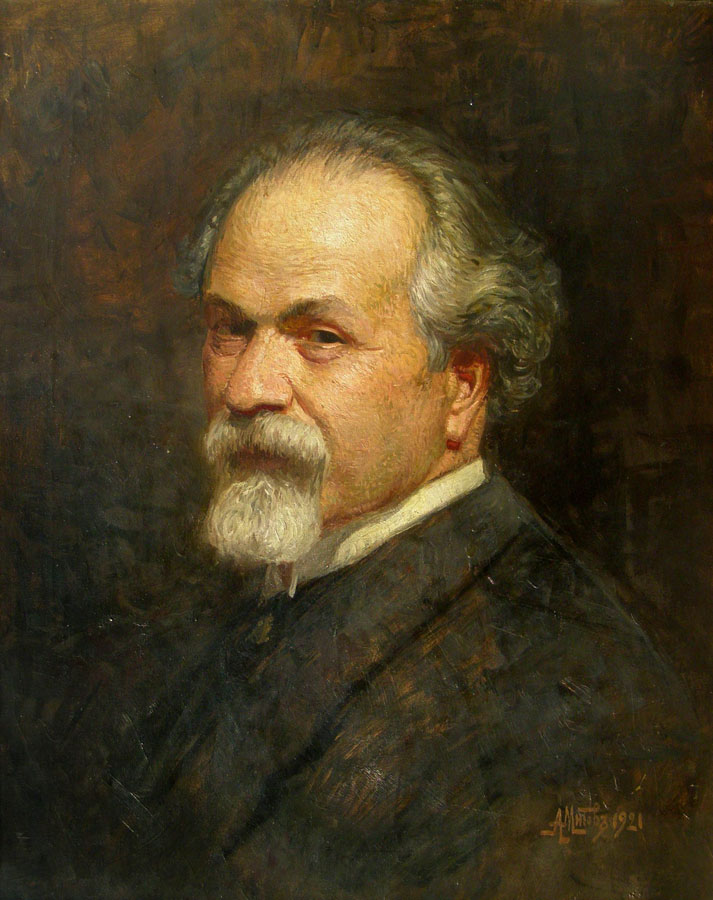
Self-portrait (1921)

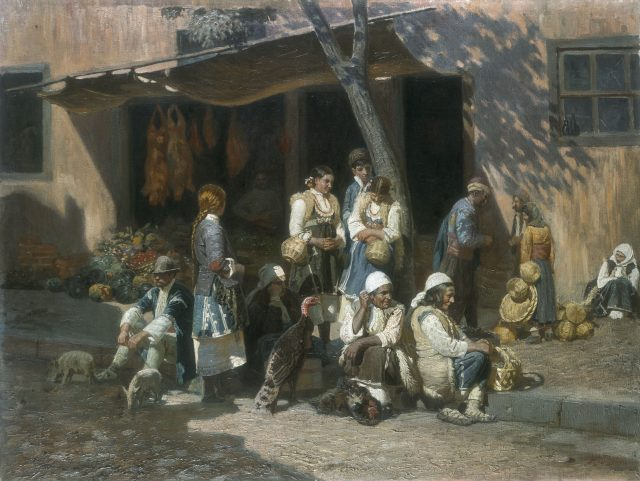
Peasants at the Market in Sofia (1903)

Anton Stefanov Mitov (Bulgarian: Антон Стефанов Митов; 1 April 1862, in Stara Zagora – 20 August 1930, in Sofia) was a Bulgarian painter, art critic, art historian, social activist and corresponding member of the Bulgarian Academy of Sciences.

== Biography ==
When he was fifteen, Ottoman troops burned his hometown and massacred over 14,000 people. His family fled to Svishtov, where they lived in poverty. He took a job as a clerk in Romania and remained there until Bulgaria was liberated in 1878, returning home determined to be an artist. In 1881, after working as a telegraph operator for two years, he saved enough money to enroll at the Accademia di Belle Arti di Firenze where he studied under the direction of Giuseppe Ciaranfi. Upon his return home, he worked as a journalist and a teacher in Stara Zagora, Plovdiv, Varna and Sofia.

In 1896, he was one of the co-founders of the National Academy of Art in Sofia, where he taught art history, drawing and perspective. He served two terms as its director, from 1912 to 1918, and from 1924 to 1927. In 1898, he was part of a team of artists that decorated the Alexander Nevsky Cathedral. One of the first Bulgarian painters to exhibit internationally, he played a decisive role in dispelling the image of his country as a cultural backwater.

He was also active in the nation's political and cultural life, making contributions to many newspapers such as Balkan Dawn, Evening Post and World as well as the magazine Art (usually under pseudonyms, such as "Tonino" and "Arnold"). He also lectured extensively and did book illustrations (those for Under the Yoke by Ivan Vazov are, perhaps, best known).

Among his works are the first seascapes painted in Bulgaria, although he specialized in genre art and portraits. A street in Plovdiv is named after him. His brother Georgi was also a well-known painter.

== Sources ==
- BgArt: Brief biography
- Антон Митов @ Facebook: Biography and paintings
- Art & Poetry Blog: Biography and paintings
