= Petko Klisurov =

Bulgarian artist and art teacher (1865–1933)

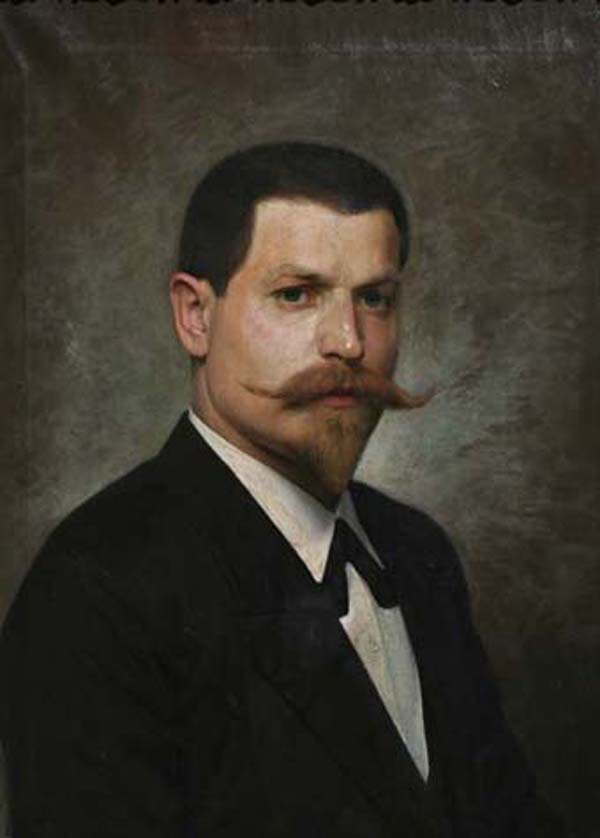
Self-portrait

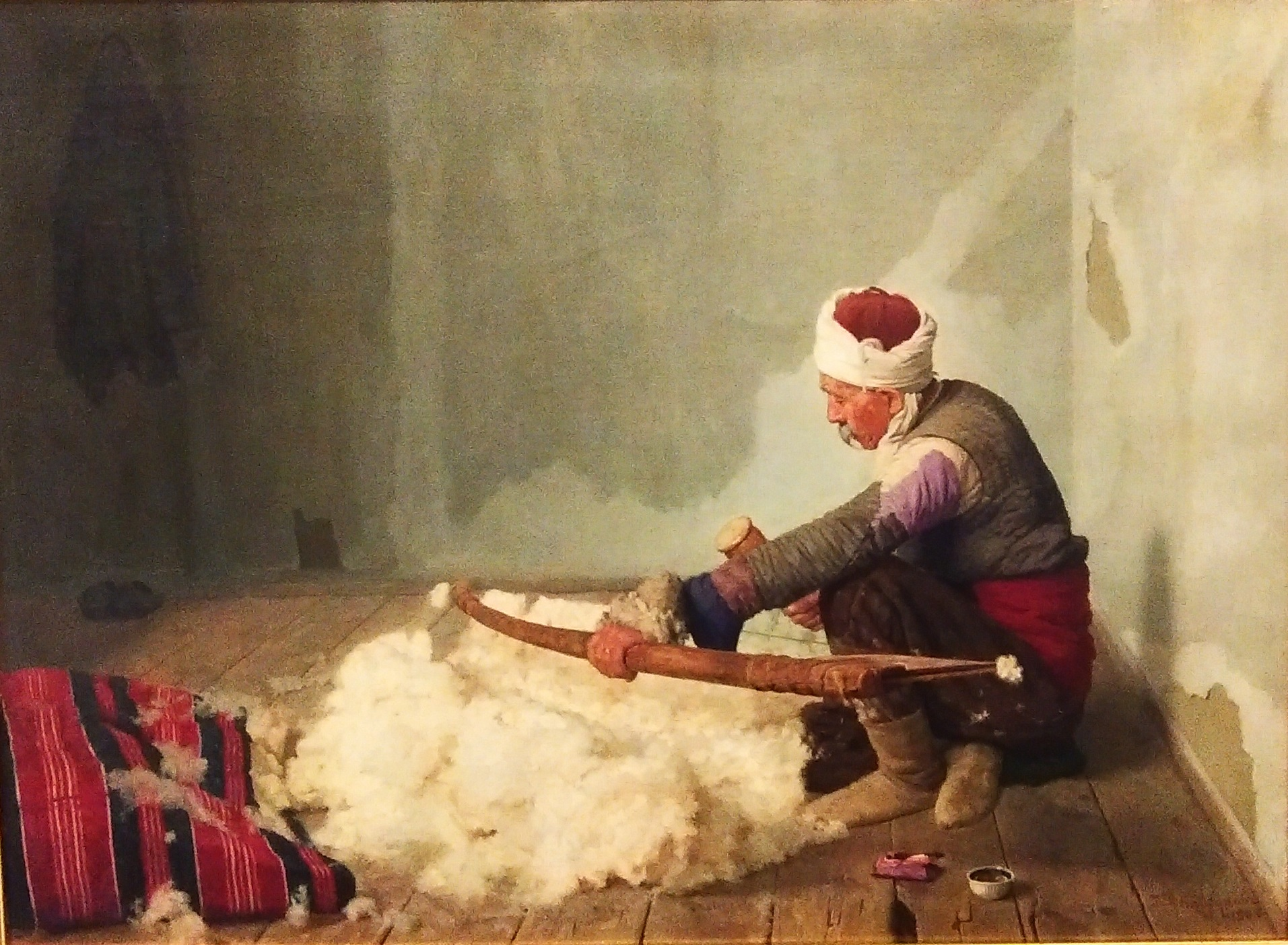
Wool Processing

Petko Dimitrov Klisurov, originally Kasarov (Bulgarian: Петко Димитров Клисуров, 29 June 1865, Kazanlak - 11 May 1933, Sofia) was a Bulgarian painter and art teacher.

== Biography ==
In 1802, his family fled from Klisura, to escape the roaming bands of robbers known as the Kurdjali. As a youth, he adopted the name "Klisurov" to reflect this heritage. He completed his secondary education in Plovdiv; becoming a teacher in the local villages, and in Stara Zagora.

In 1884, he was awarded a grant from the regional government of Rumelia, that enabled him to continue his studies in Italy. For the next three years, he lived in Florence and studied painting, with a focus on drawing from nature. In 1887, he began taking private lessons from Giuseppe Ciaranfi.

After returning to Bulgaria in 1888, he resumed his role as a teacher, in Kazanlak, Plovdiv, Varna and Sofia. Between 1899 and 1908, he was a part-time lecturer at the National Academy of Art. He was a full-time instructor there from 1911 to 1920. His students included many of the best known Bulgarian artists of the twentieth century; such as Vladimir Dimitrov, Georgi Mashev, Bencho Obreshkov and Dechko Uzunov.

In addition to oil painting, he also created decorative art. Much of his stained glass work at the Synodal Palace was damaged or destroyed during the Bombing of Sofia in World War II. A mosaic of Jesus at the Alexander Nevsky Cathedral is derived from one of his icon paintings.

In 1900, he received an award at the Exposition Universelle for his textile designs. He also participated in international exhibitions; including the Louisiana Purchase Exposition (1904), the Liège International (1905), and at the Royal Academy of Arts in London (1907). He was also awarded the Order of Saint Alexander and the Russian Order of Saint Stanislaus. After his retirement in 1920, he withdrew from public life.

Many of his works may be seen at the National Art Gallery. His son, Anastas, was a famous physician who died under mysterious circumstances.

== Sources ==
- Енциклопедия на изобразителните изкуства в България (Encyclopedia of Fine Arts in Bulgaria), Vol.1, Bulgarian Academy of Sciences, 1981 (Listing @ SVETAnaKNIGITE)
- Marin Dobrev, Художниците на Казанлък (The Artists of Kazanlak), Дъга Плюс, 2013 ISBN 978-954-9387-77-3
