= Veli Mitova =

South African philosopher

- Awards: Rhodes University Postgraduate Scholarship, Fellow of the Commonwealth Society, British Academy Newton Fellow

Education
- Education: Rhodes University (B.A 2000; M.A 2003); Cambridge University (Ph.D., 2007)
- Thesis: Doxastic accountability: why we accept epistemic norms and how to be responsible believers (2007)
- Doctoral advisor: Edward Craig, Jane Heal, Simon Blackburn

Philosophical work
- Era: 21st-century philosophy
- Region: Western philosophy
- School: Analytic
- Main interests: epistemology, moral epistemology, epistemic decolonisation

Veli Mitova is a South African philosopher, professor and director of the African Centre for Epistemology and Philosophy of Science (ACEPS) at the University of Johannesburg. She is known for her work on epistemic decolonisation and reasons for belief, in particular truthy psychologism.

== Books ==
- Believable Evidence, Veli Mitova, Cambridge University Press, 2017
- The Factive Turn in Epistemology, Veli Mitova (ed.), Cambridge University Press, 2018
