= Svishtov Municipality =

Svishtov Municipality Община Свищов
- Municipality
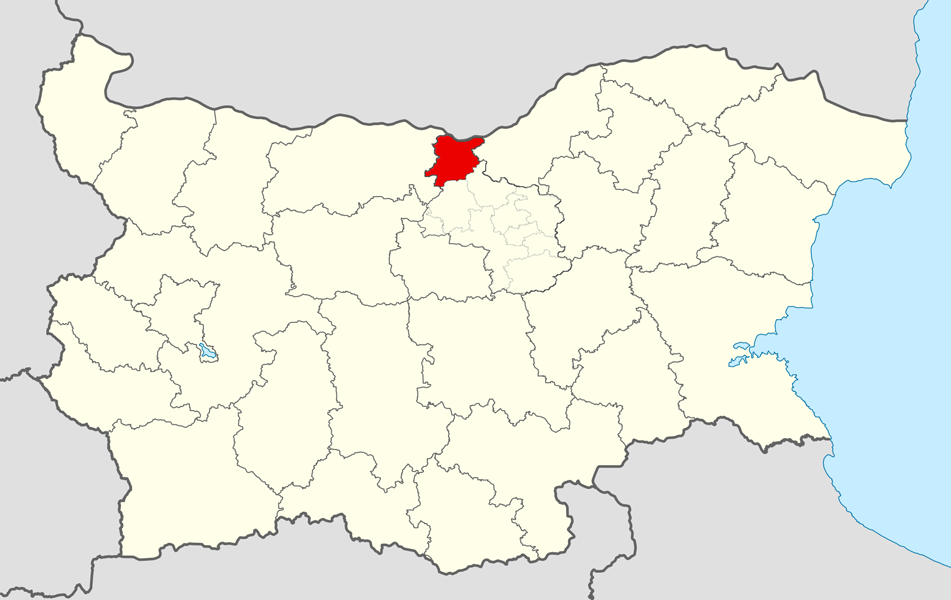
- Svishtov Municipality within Bulgaria and Veliko Tarnovo Province.
- Coordinates: 43°34′N 25°21′E
- Country: Bulgaria
- Province (Oblast): Veliko Tarnovo
- Admin. centre (Obshtinski tsentar): Svishtov

Area
  - Total: 625.5 km^{2} (241.5 sq mi)

Population (December 2009)
  - Total: 49,817
  - Density: 79.64/km^{2} (206.3/sq mi)
- Time zone: UTC+2 (EET)
  - Summer (DST): UTC+3 (EEST)

Svishtov Municipality (Bulgarian: Община Свищов) is a municipality (obshtina) in Veliko Tarnovo Province, Central-North Bulgaria, located in the Danubian Plain along the right bank of Danube river. It is named after its administrative centre - the town of Svishtov.

The municipality embraces a territory of 625.5 km^{2} (241.5 sq mi) with a population of 49,817 inhabitants, as of December 2009.

== Settlements ==
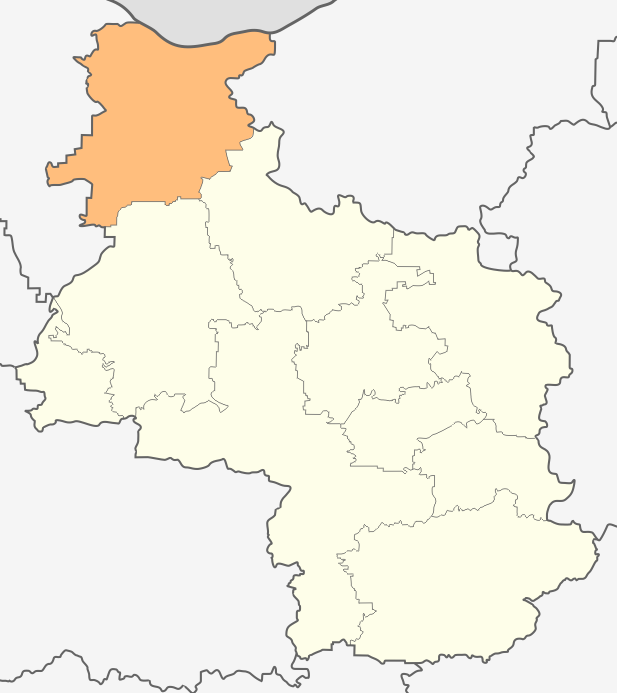
Svishtov Municipality within Veliko Tarnovo Province

Svishtov Municipality includes the following 16 places (towns are shown in bold):

| Town/Village | Cyrillic | Population (December 2009) |
|---|---|---|
| **Svishtov** | **Свищов** | 35,923 |
| Alekovo | Алеково | 688 |
| Aleksandrovo | Александрово | 289 |
| Balgarsko Slivovo | Българско Сливово | 1,390 |
| Chervena | Червена | 435 |
| Delyanovtsi | Деляновци | 167 |
| Dragomirovo | Драгомирово | 740 |
| Gorna Studena | Горна Студена | 550 |
| Hadzhidimitrovo | Хаджидимитрово | 831 |
| Kozlovets | Козловец | 1,492 |
| Morava | Морава | 1,200 |
| Ovcha Mogila | Овча могила | 1,721 |
| Oresh | Ореш | 1,779 |
| Sovata | Совата | 256 |
| Tsarevets | Царевец | 1,195 |
| Vardim | Вардим | 1,161 |
| Total | | 49,817 |

== Demography ==
The following table shows the change of the population during the last four decades.

Svishtov Municipality
| **Year** | 1975 | 1985 | 1992 | **2001** | 2005 | 2007 | 2009 | **2011** |
| **Population** | 56,264 | 52,710 | 50,177 | 47,664 | 49,255 | 49,114 | 49,817 | ... |
Sources: Census 2001, Census 2011, „pop-stat.mashke.org“,

=== Religion ===
According to the latest Bulgarian census of 2011, the religious composition, among those who answered the optional question on religious identification, was the following:

Religious composition of Svishtov Municipality
| Orthodox Christianity | 75.9% |
| Catholicism | 7.5% |
| Protestantism | 0.6% |
| Islam | 4.4% |
| No religion | 5.2% |
| Prefer not to answer, others and indefinable | 6.4% |

== See also ==
- Provinces of Bulgaria
- Municipalities of Bulgaria
- List of cities and towns in Bulgaria
