= Dragomirovo, Veliko Tarnovo Province =

Coordinates: 43°31′08″N 25°14′49″E

Dragomirovo (Bulgarian: Драгомирово) is a village in central northern Bulgaria, part of Svishtov Municipality, Veliko Tarnovo Province. As of January 2006, it has a population of 864 and the mayor is Hristo Yordanov of the National Movement Simeon II.

Dragomirovo was founded following the Liberation of Bulgaria in 1878 as part of the earliest wave of Roman Catholic Banat Bulgarian return from the Banat (in Austria-Hungary) to Bulgaria, and was settled by 141 households from Stár Bišnov and one from Brešća, as well as by another, culturally different group of Roman Catholic Bulgarians: "Bucharesters" from Popești-Leordeni and Cioplea in Wallachia, Romania.

Besides the Catholics, Dragomirovo also has a large and varied Bulgarian Orthodox population, which consists of former emigrants who had returned from Romania, as well as Bulgarian settlers from the Balkan Mountains and other inland regions, and Bulgarian refugees from Vardar Macedonia who arrived in 1922.

As a result, Dragomirovo has three neighbourhoods: the "Banatian", the "Bucharestian" (both Catholic) and the "Vlach" (of all Eastern Orthodox residents) neighbourhood. To further complicate the confessional structure of the village, a number of Protestant denominations also found supporters in Dragomirovo. In 1934, the village had 1,754 Eastern Orthodox residents and 1,204 Catholics.

== Gallery ==
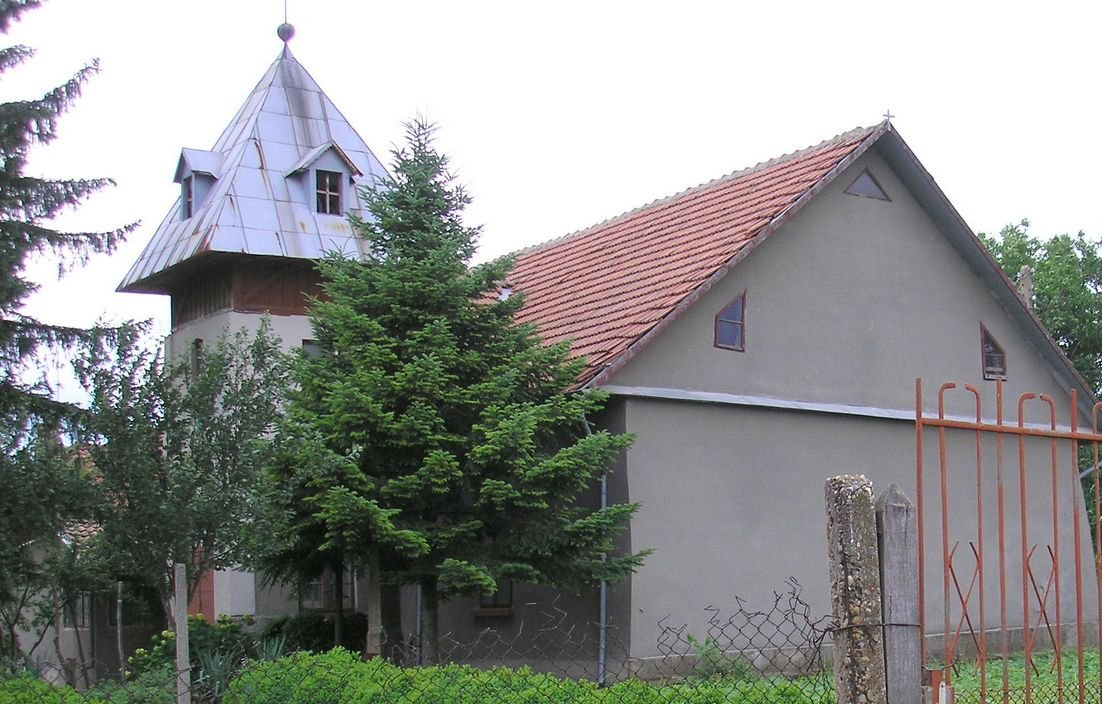
Banat Bulgarian Roman Catholic church

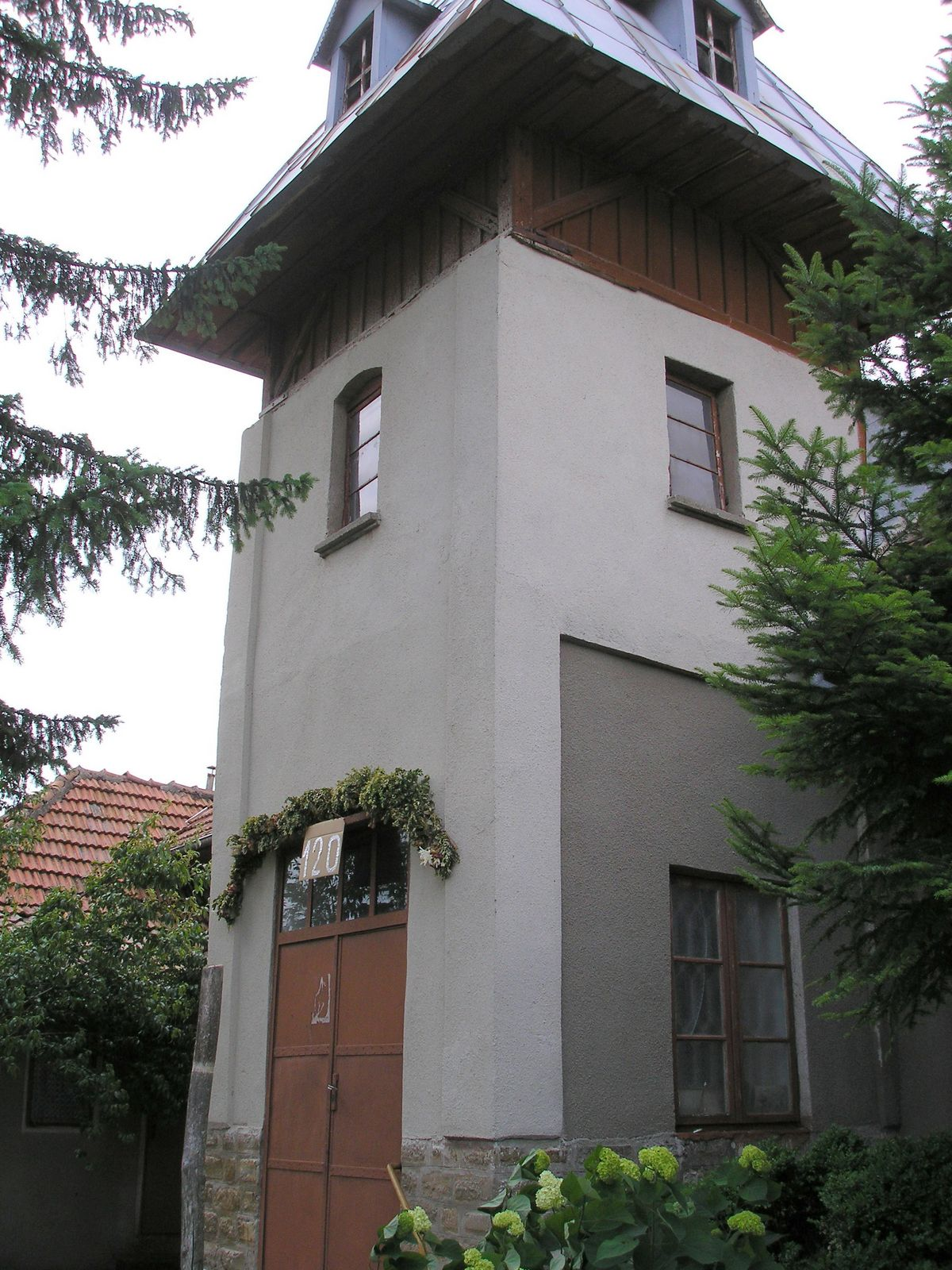
Banat Bulgarian Roman Catholic church tower

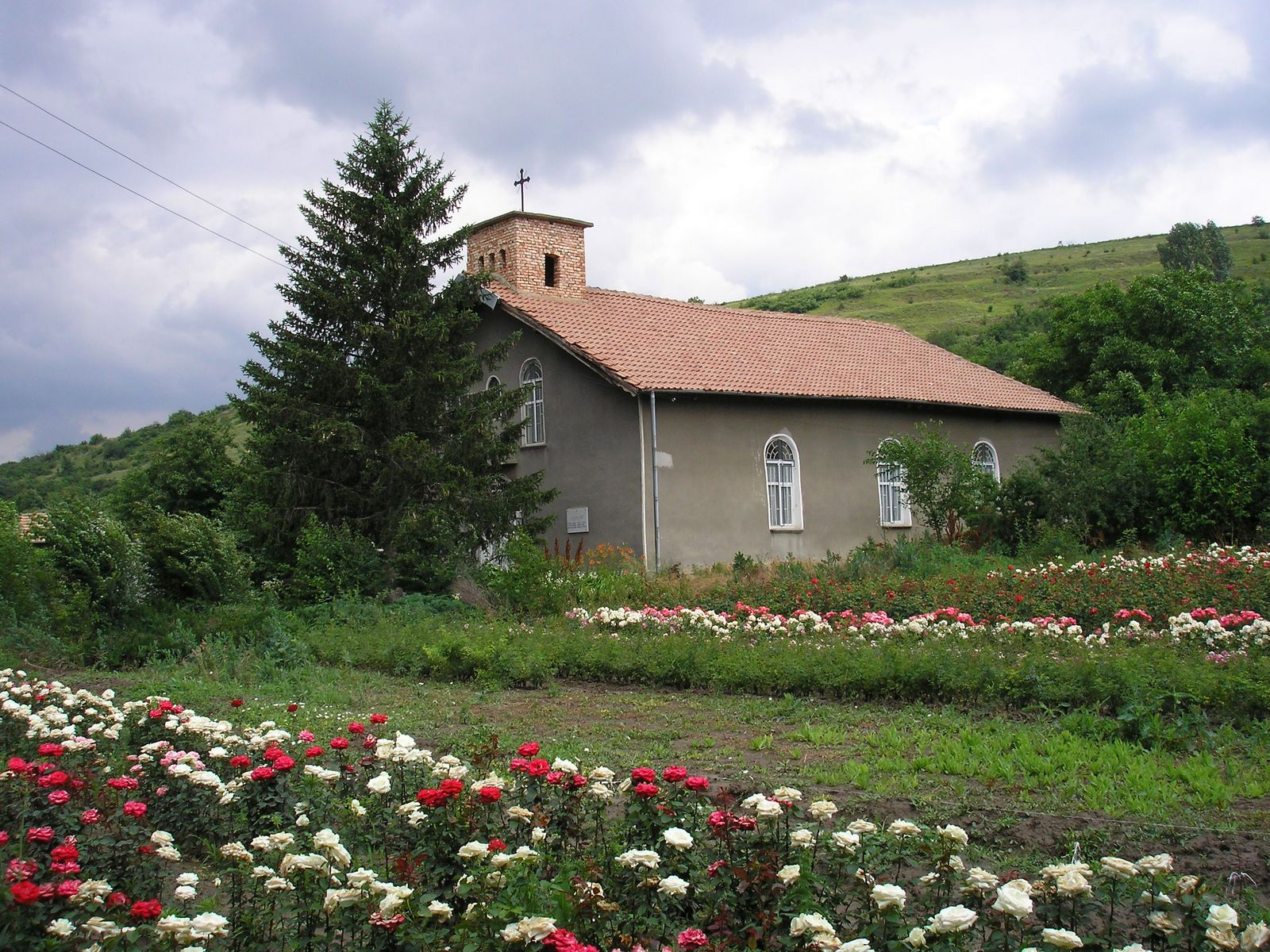
"Bucharestian" Roman Catholic church
