= Svishtov =

Svishtov Свищов
- Town
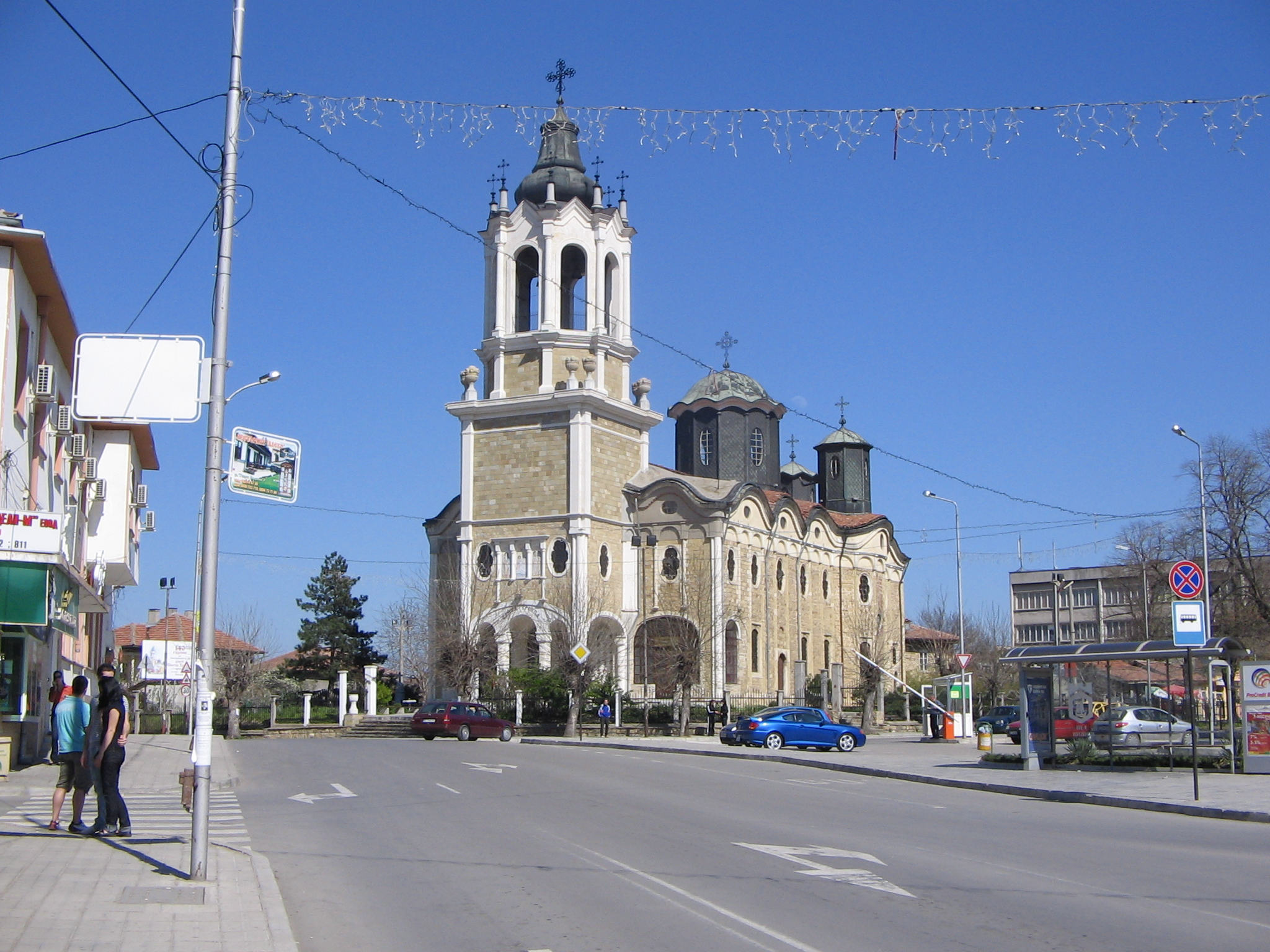
- Church of the Holy Trinity (1867) designed by Kolyo Ficheto

- Coat of arms

- Location of Svishtov
- Coordinates: 43°37′N 25°21′E
- Country: Bulgaria
- Province (Oblast): Veliko Tarnovo

Government
  - Mayor: Gencho Bozhinov Genchev

Area
  - Town: 110.721 km^{2} (42.750 sq mi)
- Elevation: 88 m (289 ft)

Population (2020)
  - Town: 26,093
  - Density: 235.66/km^{2} (610.37/sq mi)
  - Urban: 44,359
- Demonym: Svishtovian
- Time zone: UTC+2 (EET)
  - Summer (DST): UTC+3 (EEST)
- Postal Code: 5250
- Area code: 0631
- Website: svishtov.bg/index_en.php

Svishtov (Bulgarian: Свищов [sfiʃˈtɔf]) is a town in northern Bulgaria, located in Veliko Tarnovo Province on the right bank of the Danube river opposite the Romanian town of Zimnicea. It is the administrative centre of the homonymous Svishtov Municipality. The town is the second-largest in the province after the city of Veliko Tarnovo and before Gorna Oryahovitsa.

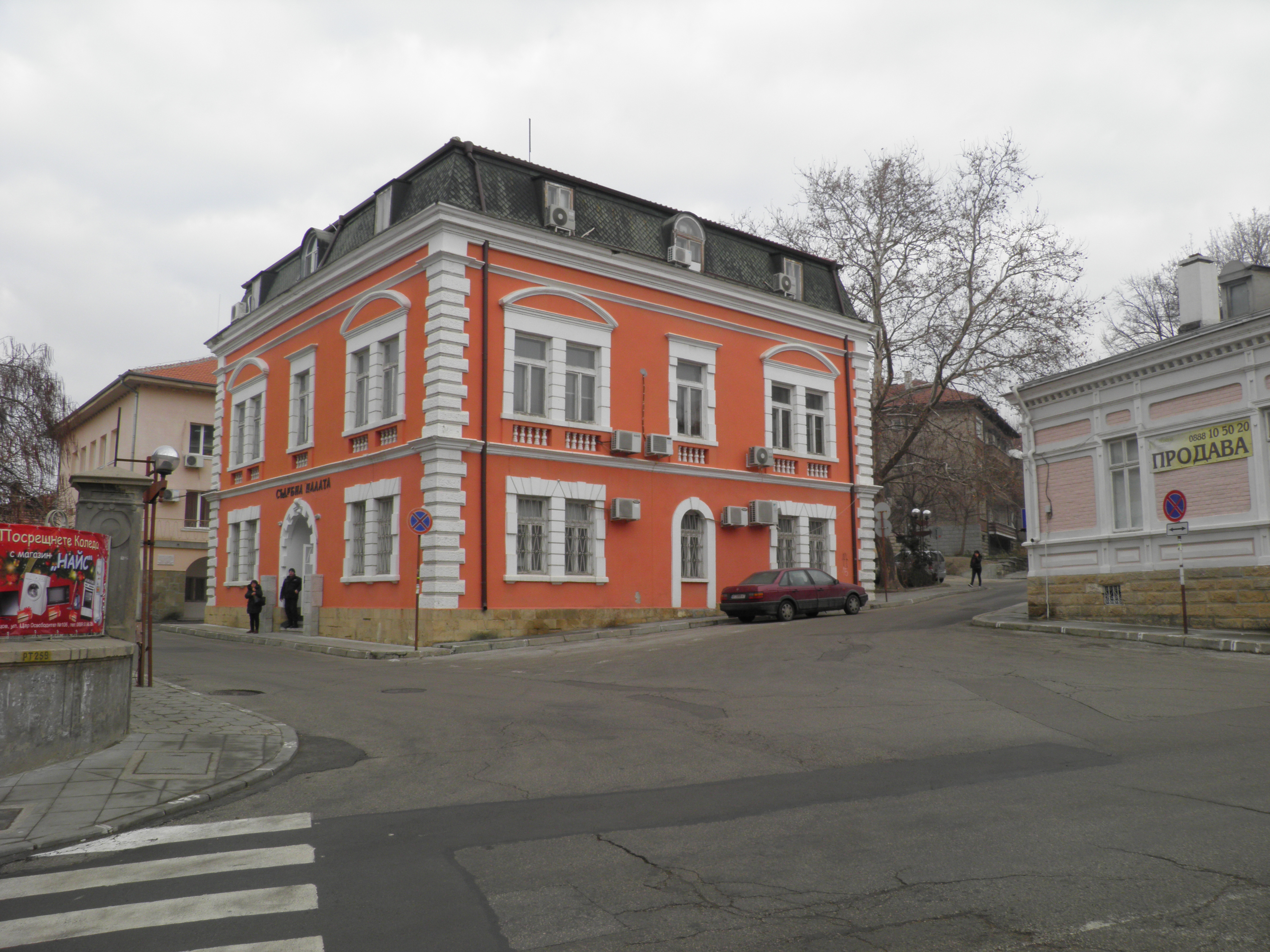
Court in Svishtov

== Name ==
The origins of the name Svishtov can be found in its old Bulgarian variation Sveshtniy (Свѣщний), deriving from the word svesht or svyasht (свѣщ), meaning "candle". This was due to the existence of a lighthouse in the city. The previous name Sistova was first mentioned in the peace treaty that ended the Austro-Turkish War in 1791, when Bulgaria was still under Ottoman rule. This name was chosen instead of the Turkish word Zigit. During the Ottoman rule of Bulgaria the town was also known as Ziștovi and in Romanian as Șiștova.

== Geography ==
Svishtov is situated in northern central Bulgaria on the right bank of the Danube river in its southernmost point, across from Zimnicea, Romania. The town lies 237 kilometres (147 miles) north-east of the capital Sofia, and 251 kilometres (156 miles) west of the major Black Sea port of Varna. Other important cities in the region are Pleven 80 kilometres (50 miles) away, and Ruse 90 kilometres (56 miles) away.

The port of Svishtov is the southernmost harbor on the Danube. It is served around the clock by the Svishtov-Zimnich ferry — a regular operation Ro-ro ferryboat across the Danube between Svishtov and Zimnicea. The ferry shortens the road path to and from Turkey to Central and Western Europe by 140 kilometres (87 miles) when compared to the traditional route over the Danube Bridge at Ruse-Giurgiu and allows a time gain of nearly four hours thus avoiding the traffic in and around the city of Bucharest.

== History ==
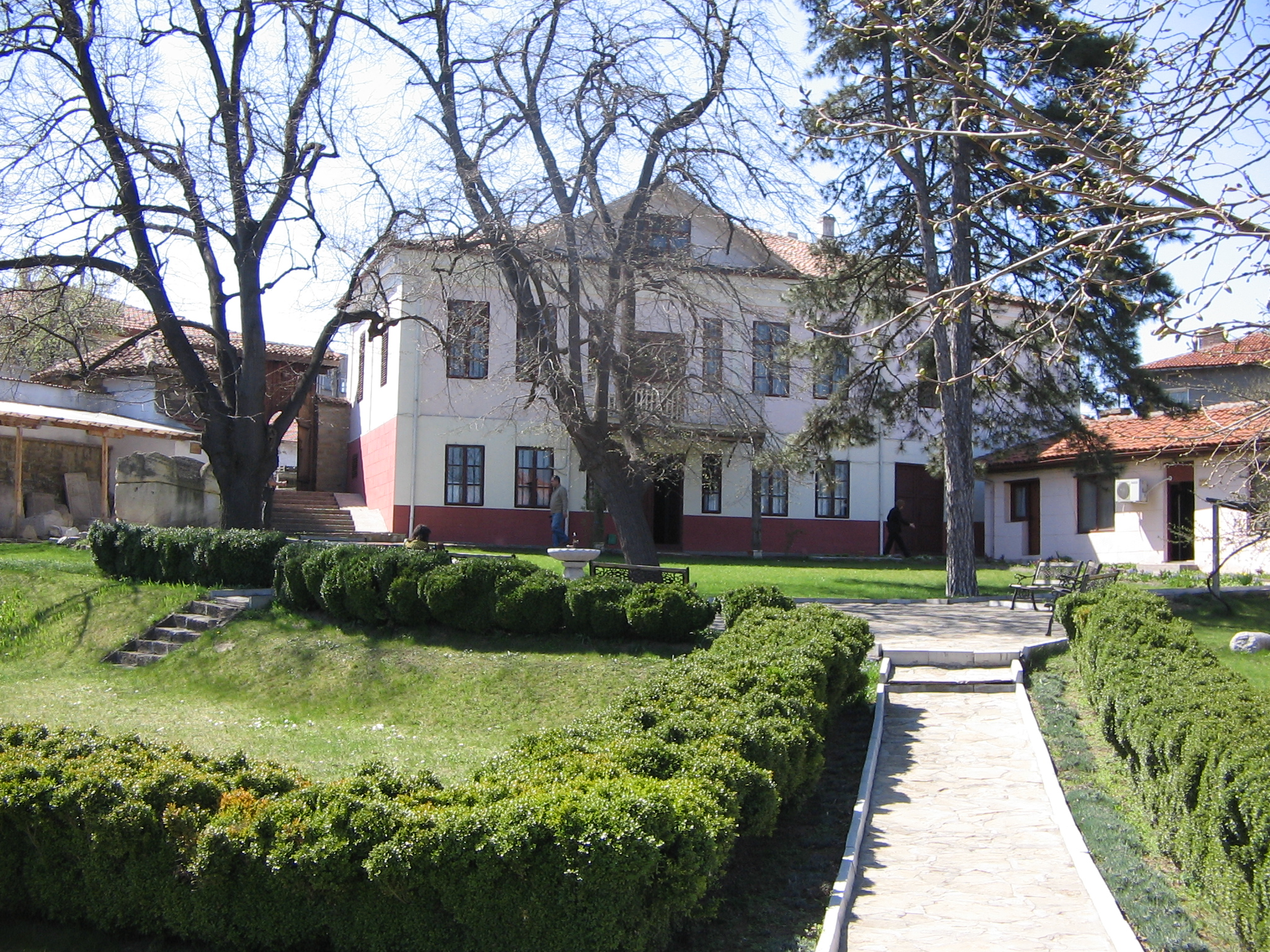
House-museum of Aleko Konstantinov

Svishtov is identified with the Roman colony Novae mentioned by Ptolemy. The emperor Vespasian sent the legion I Italica there 70 AD and Novae served as the legion's base for centuries. Novae served as a base of operations for Roman campaigns against Barbarian tribes including Trajan's Dacian Wars, and the last time during Maurice's Balkan campaigns. The legion was also responsible for bridge construction over the Danube.

The colony of Novae was the residence of St. Lupus of Novae.

For a short time the place was the main city for the Ostrogoths of Theodoric the Great. Theodoric occupied Singidunum in 471 and, after plundering Macedonia and Greece, settled in Novae (the modern Svishtov), on the lower Danube, in 483, where he remained till he transferred the sphere of his activities to Italy ten years later.

It was destroyed some time after 613, as shown by coin founds minted up to this date.

The Treaty of Sistova ended the last Austro-Turkish war (1787–91). Brokered by Great Britain, Prussia and the Netherlands,[1] it was signed in Sistova (modern Svishtov) in present-day Bulgaria on 4 August 1791.[2] The treaty was written in French and Turkish.[1]

During one of the Russo-Turkish Wars in 19th century, Svishtov has been burnt down to the ground during the retreat of the Russian Army. The city fortress has been destroyed and the population has been forced to leave the city and move across the river Danube. It was done by the order of General Nikolay Kamenskij and executed by General Guillaume Emmanuel Guignard de Saint-Priest. The event has taken place on September 27, 1810 (Sept 14, according to Julian Calendar). Account in regards of that event has been given by Dr. Dimitar Pavlovich in his book "The life of Dimitar Hadzhivasilev", published in 1906 and in the biography book of General Mikhail Semyonovich Vorontsov. A year later the restoration of the city has started with the efforts by few returned natives from Svishtov. The funding of the first street projects has been secured by donated profit, made from vineyard production. In few years the city was completely rebuilt and back to life as one of the main ports on Danube river. In 1829 half of the city was burned again during the next war between Russia and Ottoman Empire, by the order of General Dibich. Soon everything was restored. Svishtov became the home education and newly founded schools, sponsored by generous donors, citizens of Svishtov who built the first vocational school of trade and the University of Svishtov, Academy of Economics, first secular education school, etc.

Svishtov is known as the first town to be liberated during the Russo-Turkish War, 1877-78, since the largest part of the Imperial Russian Army forced the Danube nearby. In January 1878 a correspondent of The Times of London noted that, because of the war, "Sistova does not present its former animated appearance, although there is much more movement here than I expected, . . . with roast turkeys, chickens, and all other delicacies of the season on the bill of fare" of the "numerous restaurants in the town."

On 4 March 1977, Svishtov suffered major structural damage in the Vrancea earthquake, including the collapse of three apartment blocks in which over 100 people were killed.

Svishtov Cove in Livingston Island in the South Shetland Islands, Antarctica is named for the town of Svishtov.

== Religion ==
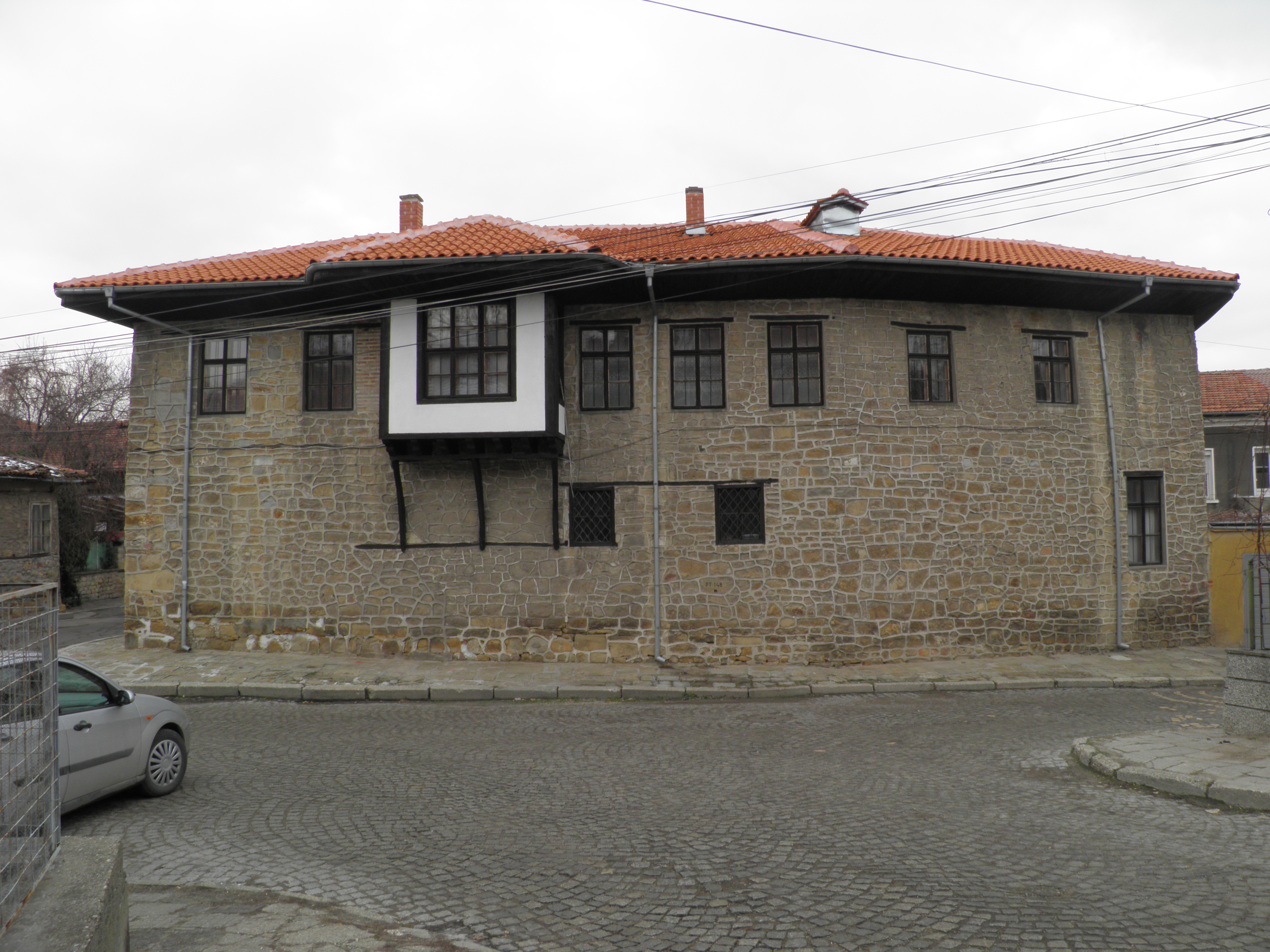
Еthnographic museum in Svishtov

The main religion in Svishtov is Eastern Orthodox Christianity. There is also a small group of Roman Catholics that have migrated from the surrounding villages of Oresh, Dragomirovo and the town of Belene, and small group of Muslims.

== Politics ==
The mayor of Svishtov Municipality is Gencho Bozhinov Genchev.

== Education ==
=== Higher education ===
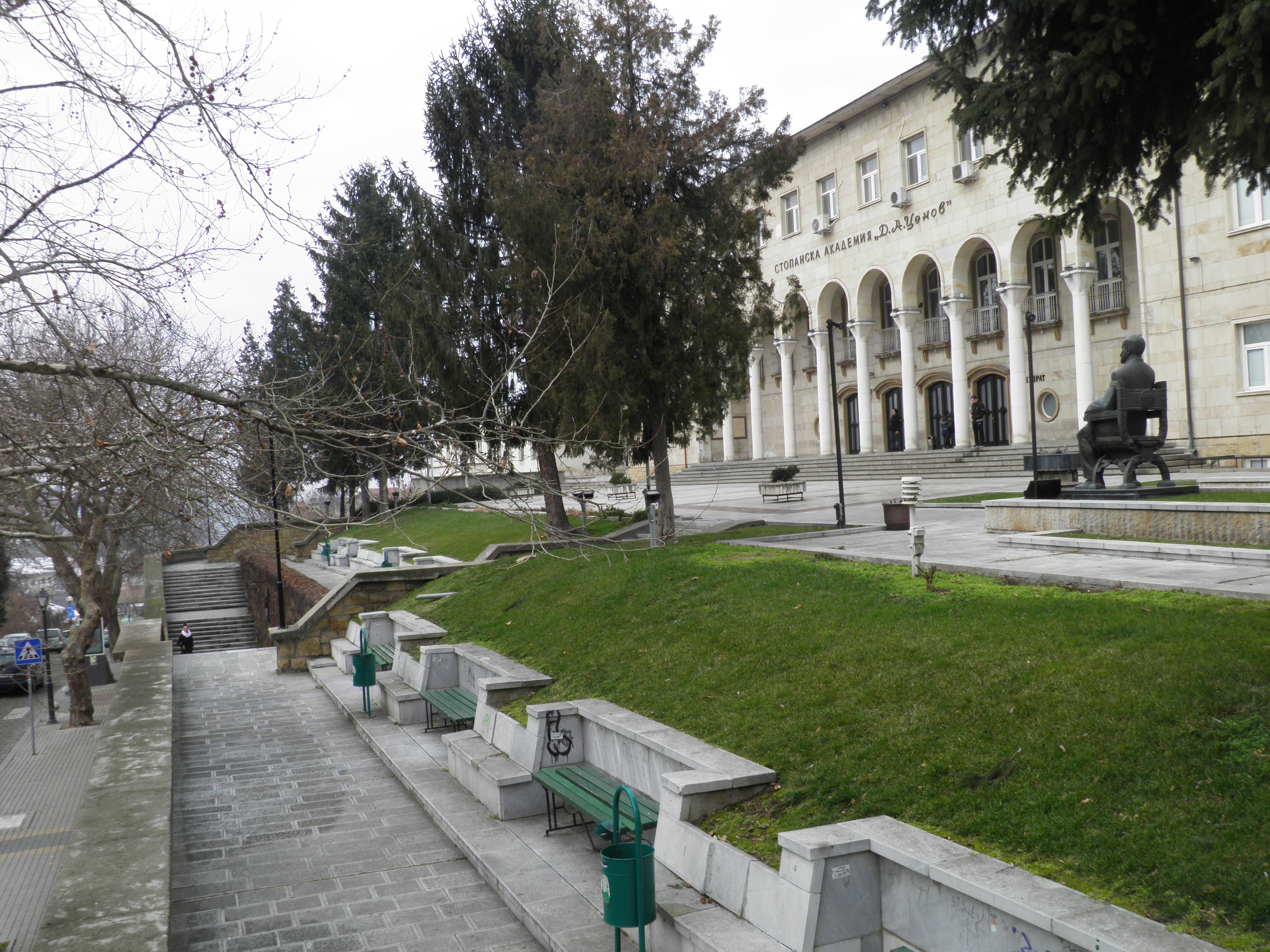
D. A. Tsenov Academy of Economics

The D. A. Tsenov Academy of Economics was established in 1936 with decree-law signed by Boris III. Since then Svishtov has become an academician town.

=== Professional education ===
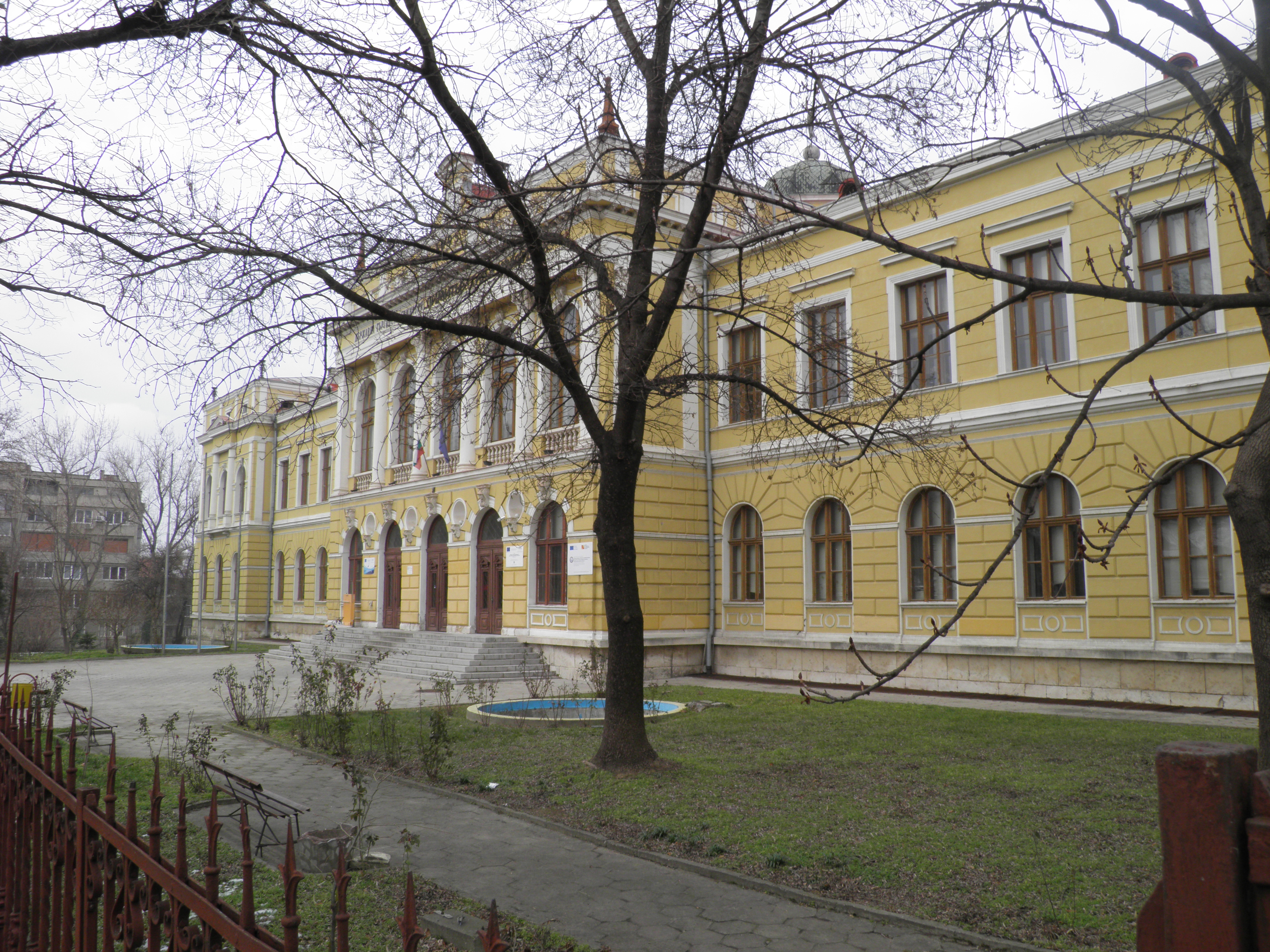
State commercial high school "Dimitar Hadjivasilev"

State commercial high school "Dimitar Hadjivasilev" is the first vocational school in Bulgaria. The first commercial school was established in 1883, with decision of the National Assembly.

== Transport ==
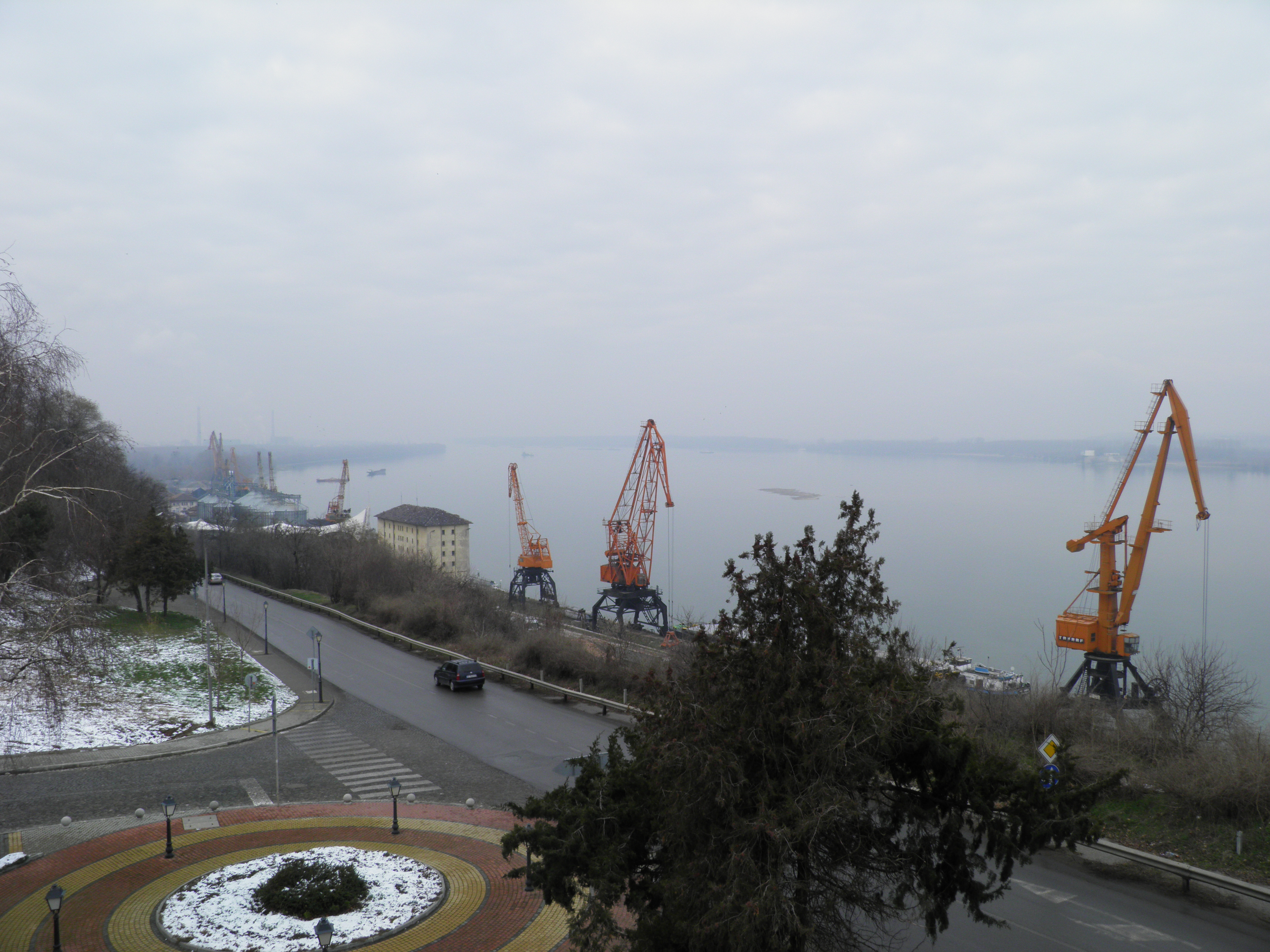
Port Svishtov

In the area of the town had a port since the 16th century. Port Svishtov was built in 1906.

== Economy ==
The main industries in the town of Svishtov include imports and exports via the harbor, electronics, chemical manufacturing, and wheat production. The town's University of Economics is also a major economic draw. Additionally, there are a large number of European tourists, particularly from Romania, who frequent Svishtov because of its relatively lower prices.

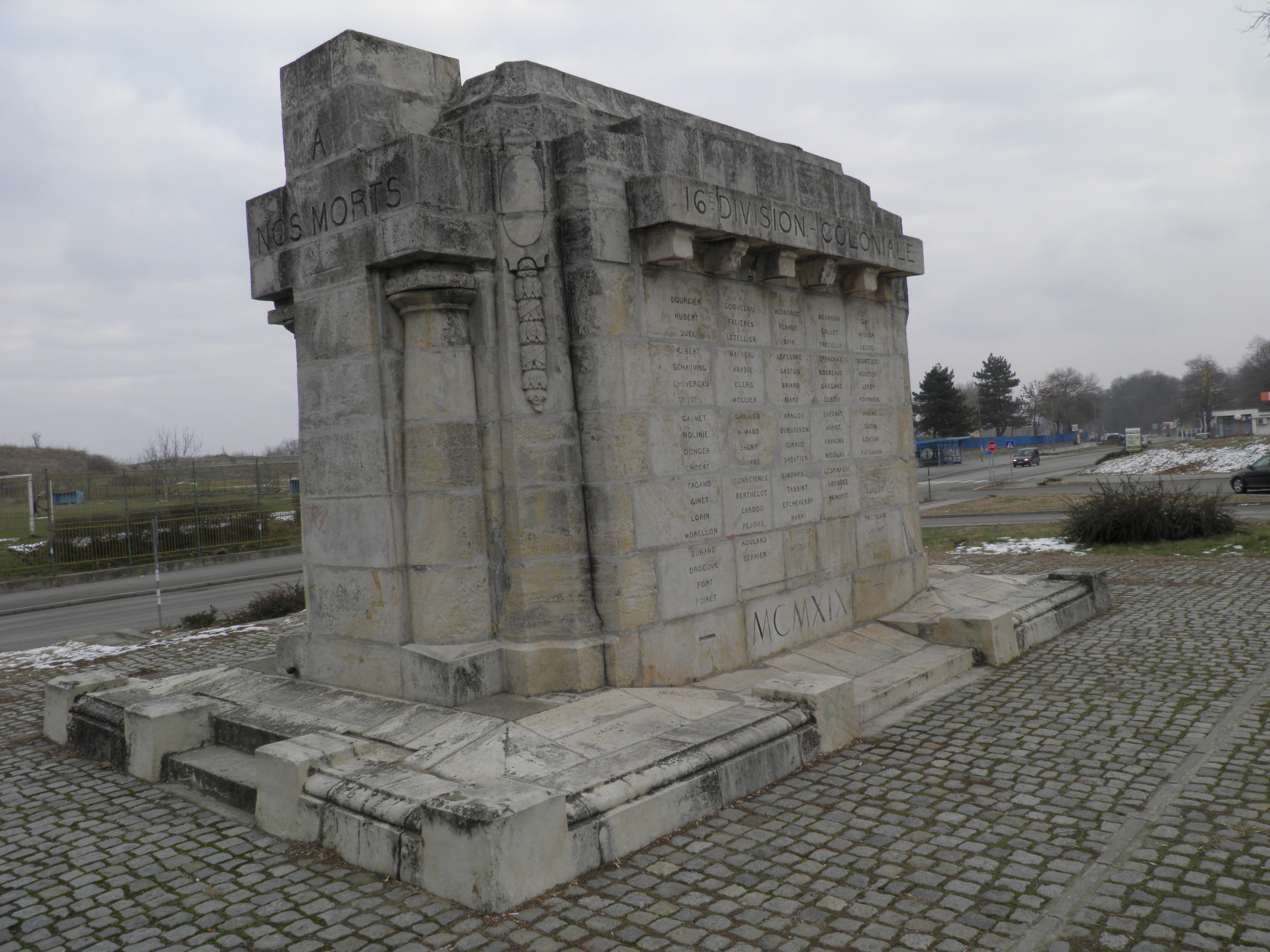
Monument to the fallen of the 16th colonial infantry division of the French army (1918)

== Landmarks and Interesting places ==
One of the many interesting places around Svishtov is the unique river valley (1 to 2 km (1 to 1 mi) away from the town) which hosts the monastery of Svishtov; a region called Pametnitsite / Паметниците (The Monuments) on the banks of the Danube and the park around the old fortress in the centre the town.

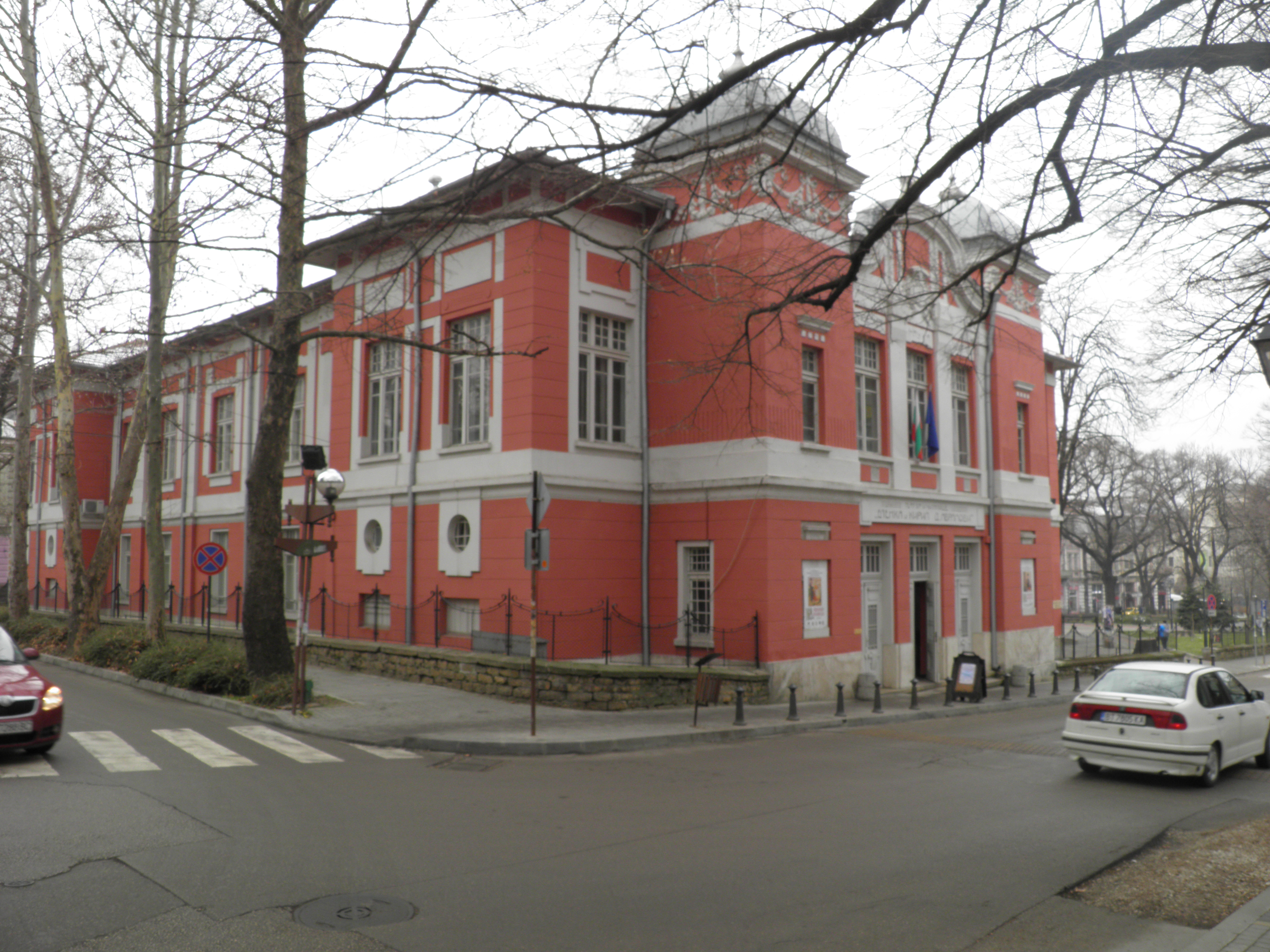
Community center "Elenka and Kiril D. Avramovi - 1856", first community center in Bulgaria

The House-museum of the Bulgarian novelist Aleko Konstantinov is one of the top 100 Tourist Sites of Bulgaria.

Another place of interest in town is the region called Мanastira / Манастира (The monastery) 5 kilometres (3 miles) south-east of the town. The name of this place comes from the monastery, that is there. Its name is "Shroud of the Holy Mother" (also known as "Virgin Mary’s Winding Sheet"). It has a church named "The Assumption of Virgin Mary" and 2 residential buildings.

=== Mineral water springs ===
"Toplata Voda" was originally drilled for petrol in the 1980s, but instead of petrol they found one of the famous sources of thermal water springs in North Bulgaria. The same source is feeding the balneo centers such as Pulski Trumbesh, Ovcha Mogila, well known from many years. The place is next to Persina, also see Persina's official website. The spring has a small pool and the water comes from it at 48 degrees Celsius. In the pool it is 44–45 degrees. The place is 5 kilometers west from the city.

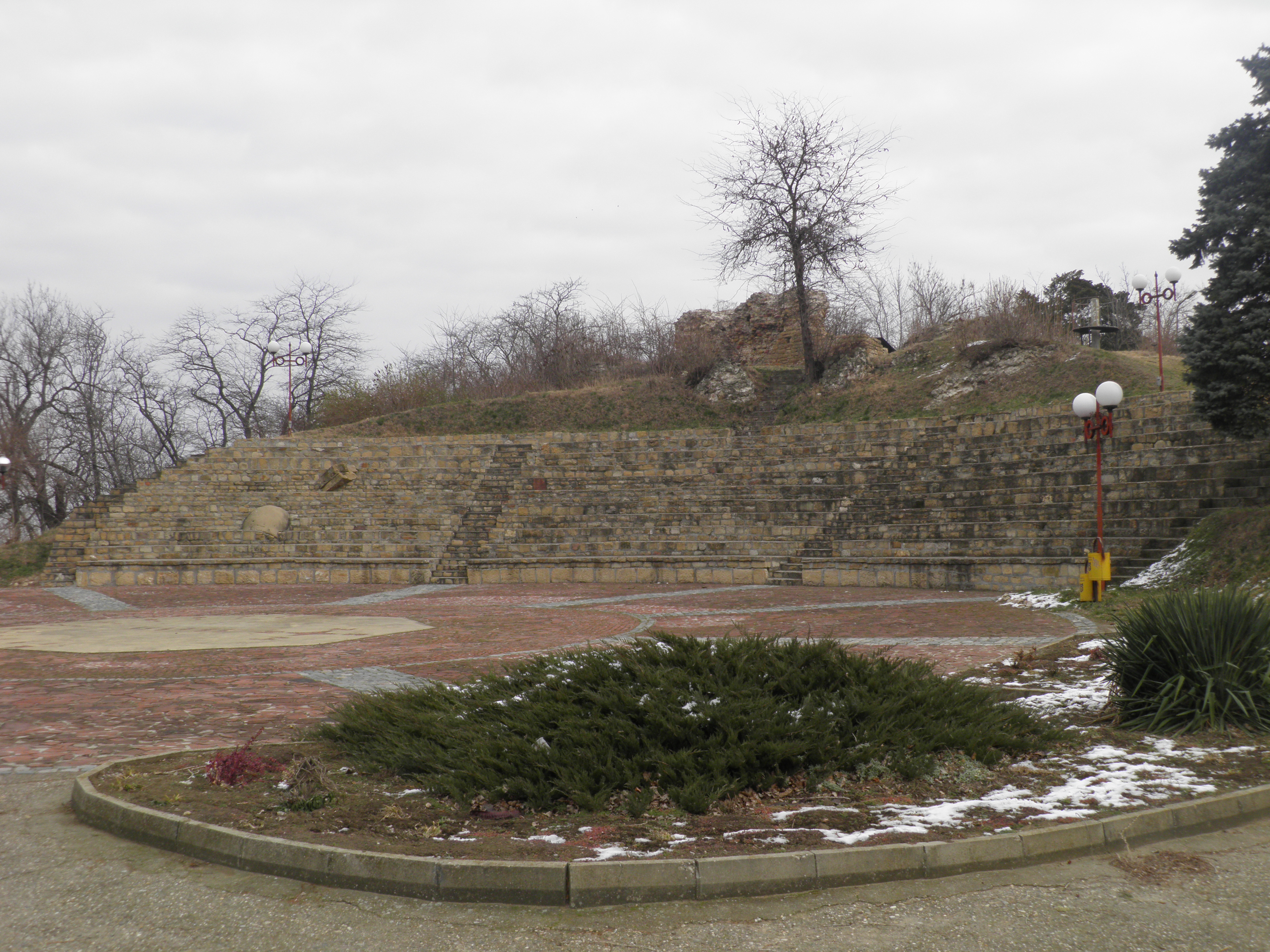
Sun clock in Svishtov

== Climate ==
Svishtov has a humid subtropical climate with considerable continental influences. The summer lasts five months, from May to September. Winters start in early December and last until March.

Climate data for Svishtov, Bulgaria (2000-2014)
Month	Jan	Feb	Mar	Apr	May	Jun	Jul	Aug	Sep	Oct	Nov	Dec	Year
Mean daily maximum °C (°F)	2.6 (36.7)	5.3 (41.5)	12.8 (55.0)	19.1 (66.4)	25.7 (78.3)	28.9 (84.0)	31.4 (88.5)	31.3 (88.3)	25.5 (77.9)	18.5 (65.3)	10.9 (51.6)	4.3 (39.7)	18.0 (64.4)
Daily mean °C (°F)	0.2 (32.4)	1.7 (35.1)	7.9 (46.2)	13.7 (56.7)	20.3 (68.5)	24.0 (75.2)	26.3 (79.3)	26.3 (79.3)	21.3 (70.3)	13.8 (56.8)	7.7 (45.9)	1.6 (34.9)	13.8 (56.8)
Mean daily minimum °C (°F)	−2.4 (27.7)	−1.9 (28.6)	3.0 (37.4)	8.3 (46.9)	14.2 (57.6)	18.0 (64.4)	20.1 (68.2)	20.2 (68.4)	16.1 (61.0)	9.1 (48.4)	4.4 (39.9)	−1.2 (29.8)	9.0 (48.2)
Source: Stringmeteo.com

== Literature ==
1. Stoyan Arshinkov - "Dear Motherland", Tsvetan Radoslavov Hadjidenkov, Sofia, BAS, 1985
2. V. Atseva, "Archive of Nikolai Pavlovich", 1852 - 1894, ed. BAS, 1980
3. Angel Balashev - Svishtov 60 and more years ago - Sofia 2007, Multiprint EOOD
4. Lachezar Georgiev - Twice hung on the gallows (Botev's Chetnik Sava Penev) - Sofia, 1992
5. Ivan Gunev - Emanuil Vaskidovich and his Slavic-Bulgarian secular school - ed. Patriotic Front, Sofia, 1987
6. Dr. Racho Kazanski - Sprouts for the new revival - under the ashes of spiritual ruin - Sofia
7. Georgi Karpachev - The House Museum, the Grand Duke, Vladimir Alexandrovich in the village of Gorna Studena - Sofia P. Glushkov printing house, 1907
8. Margarita Kovacheva - Dragan Tsankov - public figure, politician, diplomat, 1878 - Sofia, Science and Art, 1982
9. Yordan Nikolov - The first Bulgarian choir (local memories) - Svishtov, AD Panichkov, 1925
10. Julia Nikolova, Tsv. Again - Vasil Manchev, memories
11. Julia Nikolova - "Eat with dignity" - Svishtov in the XIX century and the first decade of the XX century - personalities, events, facts - ed. Ivray, 2006
12. Nikolai D. Pavlovich - Nikolai Pavlovich 1835 - 1894 - Sofia, Science and Art, 1955
13. Parvoleta Prokopova, Yanko Apostolov - Svishtov, Sofia Press 1977
14. Vasil Radkov - Nests of Conspiracy Sparks of Curiosity - Fifth Donevski, ed. Abagar V. Tarnovo, 2006
15. Radko Radkov - Svishtov - cultural and historical landmarks, ed. Abagar, V. Tarnovo, 2007
16. Dr. N. Sakarov - Commercial and economic importance of Svishtov - ed. Svishtov Friendship in Sofia, 1928
17. Dr. Maria Tosheva - History of Health Care in Svishtov - Svishtov Academic Publishing House "Tsenov", 2004
18. Doncho Tuzharov - Hearth of Science and Patriotism (50 years of VFSI "DA Tsenov", Svishtov) - Sofia, 1986
19. Georgi Hristov - "Svishtov in the past (86 - 1877)", ed. Svishtov, PA Slavkvov 1936
20. Hristo Tsekov - Dimitar Tsenovich - Sofia Bulgarika, 1997
21. Hristo Tsekov - The Confession of Botev's Chetnik Ivanitsa Danchev - Sofia Bulgarika, 1998
22. A series of "diaries and memories of Bulgarian history", ed. team - Peter Neykov (diplomat), memoirs, ed. Patriotic Front, Sofia 1990
23. Svishtov in the Renaissance - 1934 Phototype edition - 1994/6
24. Greetings from Svishtov, ed. Svishtov Municipality, 2007
25. Svishtov - pages from his Revival past and the Liberation of Bulgaria (125 years since the declaration of the Russo-Turkish War) - Svishtov, 2002
26. Dimitar Vassilev State Trade High School, Svishtov - Jubilee Collection 1884 - 1934, Svishtov, P.A. Slavkov, 1935
27. Archpriest Stefan Ganchev, contribution to its history - Svishtov, PA Slavkov, 1929. Phototype edition, republished by the Aleko Konstantinov Foundation, Svishtov, 1996.
28. Jubilee collection "100 years of the State Trade High School" D. Vassilev ”- 1884 - 1984, Svishtov, 1984
29. Jubilee collection of the Svishtov Chitalishte 1856 - 1931
30. Jubilee collection of the first Bulgarian community center - "Elenka and Kiril D. Avramovi in Svishtov, 1856 - 1956

=== Twin towns – Sister cities ===
Svishtov is twinned with:

- Dębica in Poland
- Veles in North Macedonia
