= Shmuel Ben David =

Bulgarian artist (1884–1927)

Shmuel Ben David שמעון בן דוד
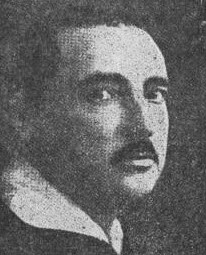
- Born: Shabat Menachem Davidov; 1884; Sofia, Bulgaria
- Died: 1927 (aged 42–43); Jerusalem, Mandatory Palestine
- Resting place: Mount of Olives Jewish Cemetery
- Education: National Academy of Fine Arts
- Style: Painting

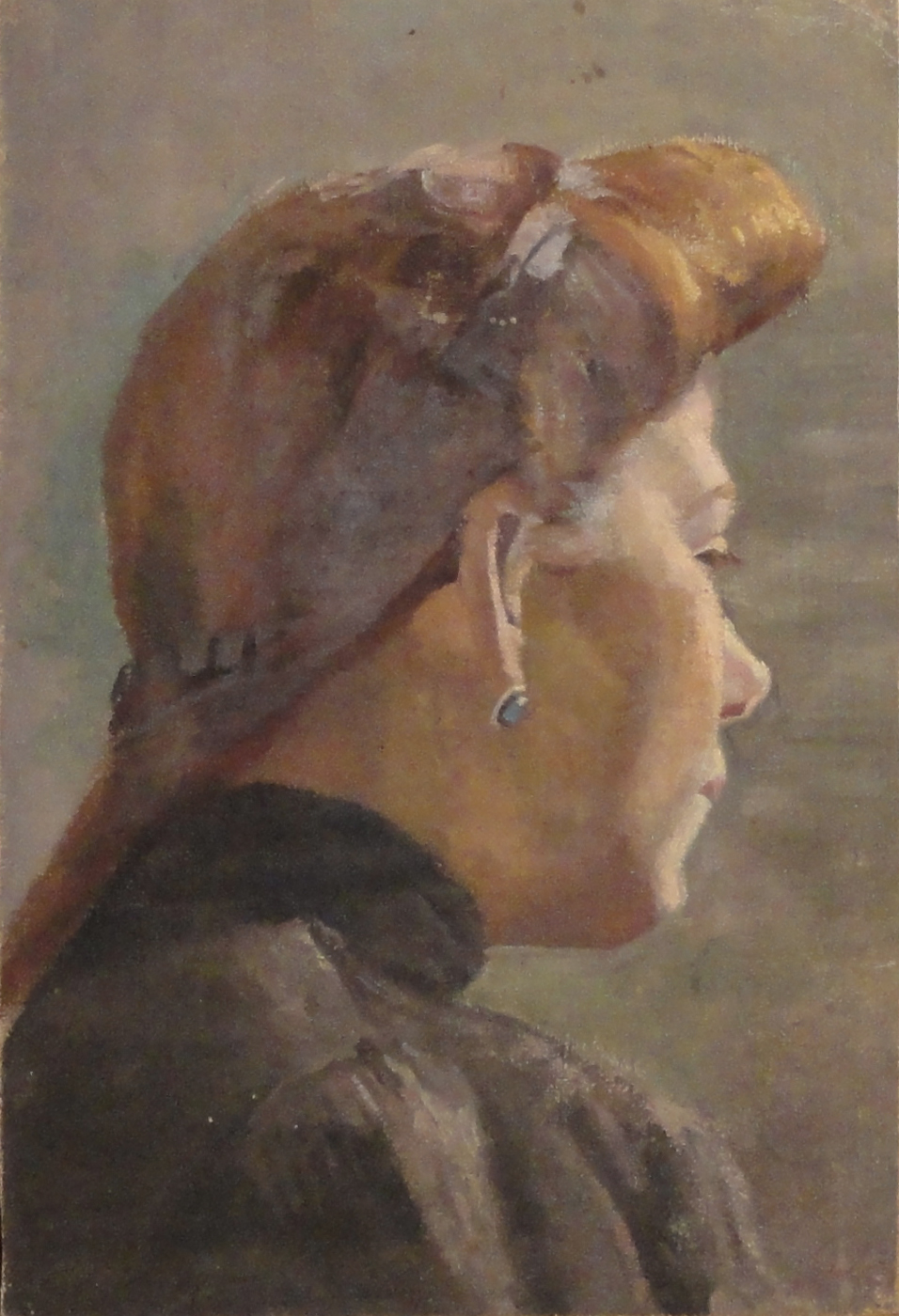
Portrait of a Woman by Shmuel Ben David.

Shmuel Ben David (Hebrew: שמעון בן דוד; 1884–1927), born in Sofia, Bulgaria, was an illustrator, painter, typographer and designer affiliated with the Bezalel school, an art movement that developed in Jerusalem in the early twentieth century.

== Biography ==
Shabat Menachem Davidov (later Shmuel Ben David) studied under Boris Schatz at the National Academy of Fine Arts in Sofia. In 1906, he immigrated to Palestine and enrolled at the Bezalel School of Arts and Crafts established by Schatz in Jerusalem. Ben David was the first Bezalel student to become a teacher there. He taught in the Tapestry Department and devoted much of his artistic endeavor to research and design of Hebrew typography; his preoccupation with the Hebrew alphabet brought forth an extensive lexicon of ornamentation.

In 1912, the artist traveled to Paris and continued his art studies at the Academie Julian and left a collection of sketch books. In 1920 Ben David was one of the founders of the Agudat Omanim Ivrit (Association of Hebrew Artists). He organized the Association's first exhibition and was its first chairman. Around 1923, Ben David produced a unique copy of an illuminated Scroll of Esther, made of parchment.

Ben David died in Jerusalem in 1927 and was buried in the Mount of Olives Cemetery.

== See also ==
- Visual arts in Israel
