= Nikolay Rainov =

Nikolai Rainov (Bulgarian: Николай Райнов) (1889–1954) was a Bulgarian writer, poet, artist and scholar. He was one of the most remarkable East European modernists.

Nikolai Rainov was born on January 1, 1889, in Kesarevo, Veliko Tarnovo Province, Bulgaria.

In 1908 Rainov graduated from Sofia Theological Seminary. He was offered a scholarship from the Bulgarian Orthodox Church to continue his studies in Theology in Russia or to study Philosophy in Germany. However, the offer was under the condition Rainov get ordained, which he refused. In 1911 he enrolled into Sofia University to study Philosophy. After serving as war correspondent during World War I in 1919 he graduated from the National Academy of Art in Sofia.

In 1919 Rainov started an extensive journey to the East. In particular, he visited Syria, Egypt, Palestine, Asia Minor and, according to some sources, India.

In 1922-1927 Rainov was Senior Librarian in Ivan Vazov National Library in Plovdiv. In the period from 1918, when he began his literary career, and 1928, he published a series of highly praised fragmented, sometimes controversial poetical texts, most notably: Bogomil Legends (Bogomilski Legendi), The Eyes of Arabia (Ochite na Arabia), The Book of Mysteries (Kniga na Zagadkite), Between the Desert and Life (Mejdu Pustiniata i Jivota), The City (Gradat), The Ship of the Immortals (Korabat na bezsmartnite). After 1924-1925 he dedicated himself mostly to folklore and aesthetic writings, including more than 30 volumes of fairy-tales from all over the world, 9 volumes of history of Bulgarian literature and 12 volumes of history of art.
