= Vera Nedkova =

Bulgarian modernist painter (1906–1996)

- Born: 16 November 1906; Skopje, Ottoman Empire
- Died: 7 July 1996 (aged 89); Sofia, Bulgaria
- Education: National Academy of Art; Vienna Academy of Fine Arts
- Known for: Painting

Vera Nedkova (Bulgarian: Вера Недкова) (16 November 1906 – 7 July 1996) was a Bulgarian modernist painter. A graduate of the Vienna Academy of Fine Arts, she is known as "the grande dame of Bulgarian painting."

Born in Skopje to Bulgarian diplomat Todor Nedkov and musician Rayna Sarmadjieva, Vera and her family immigrated to Sofia after Skopje fell under Serbian control during the Balkan Wars.

In 1923, Nedkova enrolled at the National Academy of Art, where she studied painting under renowned professor Nikola Marinov. In 1924, when her father was stationed in Austria, she transferred to the Vienna Academy of Fine Arts to continue her studies in painting under Karl Sterrer and later restoration under Robert Maurer, graduating in 1930. While in Austria, she befriended composer Richard Strauss and author Robert Musil, with whom she kept an active correspondence.

Nedkova relocated to Florence in 1931, where she studied the art of Giotto, Masaccio, and Piero della Francesca, before returning to Bulgaria in 1934, where she would remain until her death in 1996.

From 1946 to 1961, Nedkova worked at the National Archaeological Museum as a restorer and conservator.
