= Stefan Kanchev =

Bulgarian graphic artist

- Born: Stefan Kirov Kanchev; August 6, 1915; Kalofer, Kingdom of Bulgaria
- Died: August 22, 2001 (aged 86)
- Known for: Graphic art
- Awards: Order of Cyril and Methodius 1st class 1956

Stefan Kirov Kanchev (Bulgarian: Стефан Киров Кънчев [ˈstɛfɐn ˈkirof ˈkɤntʃɛf]; 6 August 1915 – 22 August 2001) was a Bulgarian graphic artist best known for his logo design work. Referred to as the "father of Bulgarian graphic design" and the "master of the trademark", Kanchev authored around 1,600 logos, including logos for the National Palace of Culture, National Art Gallery, National Opera and Ballet, Bulgarian National Television, Union of Bulgarian Artists, TZUM, International Fair Plovdiv, and Petrol AD.

== Early life ==
Kanchev was born 6 August 1915 in Kalofer, a town in the sub-Balkan valleys of south central Bulgaria (then the Kingdom of Bulgaria). The son of an icon painter, he enrolled at the National Academy of Art in the capital Sofia when he was 25, where he studied mural painting in 1940–1945 under Dechko Uzunov.

== Career ==
After leaving the National Academy of Art shortly before graduation, Kanchev took part in exhibitions and biennales in Bulgaria and abroad over the next 22 years, including Belgrade, Budapest, Berlin, Moscow, Warsaw, Brno, Ljubljana and New York City. During this time, individual exhibitions of his work were organized in Sofia, Moscow, Prague, Berlin, Warsaw and Budapest, among other cities.

In 1967 when he was 52, Kanchev participated in an AIGA (American Institute of Graphic Arts) international exhibition in which he presented 23 of his logos, including his Petrol AD trademark. Fifteen years later, in 1982, Japanese magazine Idea ran a 16-page feature on Kanchev and his work. At the age of 79 in 1994 he was named among the world's top ten trademark artists along with Paul Rand and Saul Bass. Kanchev died on 22 August 2001. In June 2009, the premier Sofia Design Week featured an exhibition dedicated to Kanchev's logos.

== Themes and styles ==
Kanchev's work spanned most varieties of applied art, though he was most productive in his trademark and logo work and as a designer of book covers, posters, greetings cards, print advertisements, stamps, product labels and packaging. As a designer, Kanchev was often inspired by traditional Bulgarian art and folklore.

== Reception ==
According to the Bulgarian Academy of Sciences Encyclopedia of Fine Arts in Bulgaria, Kanchev's work "was distinguished by rich imagination, even and clear composition, successful relation between type and image, clean shapes [and] original artistic ideas that entirely fulfill the content of the work". In the words of artist and critic Ivan Nenov, "[Kanchev's] trademarks are entirely new, modern without being merely fashionable... Each of these trademarks can be magnified to a monumental size or reduced to a miniature, and it will not lose neither its readability nor its graceful beauty." For his efforts, Kanchev has received state decorations of Bulgaria, including the Order of Cyril and Methodius 1st class (in 1956, 1963 and 1969), Red Flag of Labour (1965), and People's Republic of Bulgaria 2nd class (1975).
