= Krassimir Terziev =

Bulgarian artist

- Born: December 8, 1969 (age 56); Tolbouchin, Bulgaria
- Occupation: Visual artist
- Website: terziev.info

Krassimir Terziev (Bulgarian: Красимир Терзиев; born 1969) is a Bulgarian visual artist, living and working in Sofia. He works with a broad range of media including video, photography, installation and drawing.

== Education ==
Terziev was born in Dobritch, Bulgaria. He received a Ph.D. in cultural anthropology at Sofia University (2012), and is teaching in the Digital Arts MA Programme at the National Academy of Art Sofia (Bulgarian: Национална художествена академия; abbreviated НХА, NAA), where he received an MA in painting in 1997.

== Exhibitions ==
His solo exhibitions include: Background Action, Würtembergischer Kunstverein Stuttgart, 2008, Sofia City Gallery, 2007; Making Movies, Galleria Noua, Bucharest, 2007; Remote Resemblances, Goethe-Institut Sofia, 2005; Excuse Me, Which City Is This?, Institute of Contemporary Art - Sofia, 2004; On The BG Track, Belgrade Cultural Centre, 2003; Everything Seems Alright, The Kitchen, New York, 1999. His work has been exhibited in group exhibitions, including: Actors&Extras, Argos Centre for Art and Media, Brussels, 2009, The Projection Project, MuHKA, Antwerp, 2007, Műcsarnok Kunsthalle Budapest, 2007; Cinema like never before, Generali Foundation, Vienna, 2006, Akademie der Künste, Berlin, 2007; New Video, New Europe, TATE Modern London, 2004, Stedelijk Museum, Amsterdam, 2005, Renaissance Society, Chicago, 2004, The Kitchen, NY, 2005.

== Books ==
- Terziev, Krassimir. Between the Past That is About to Happen and the Future That has Already Been. Sofia: Iztok-Zapad, 2015 (ISBN 978-619-152-726-7).
- Terziev, Krassimir. Recomposition. Author, Media and Artwork in the Age of Digital Reproduction. Sofia: Iztok-Zapad & ICA-Sofia, 2012, (ISBN 9786191521319).
- Terziev, Krassimir. Extra Work: Taking the figure of the extra in cinema as a metaphor. Stuttgart: merz&solitude, Reihe Projektiv, 2008, ISBN 978-3-937158-35-8
- A Gaze for the Pale City, Visual Seminar, 2, Sofia: Revolver, 2004, ISBN 3-86588-028-2.
