= Angelika Schatz =

European-trained Israeli artist

- Father: Boris Schatz
- Awards: Grand Prix; 1932

Angelika Schatz (Hebrew: אנג'ליקה שץ; 1897 – May 1975) was an Israeli artist.

== Biography ==
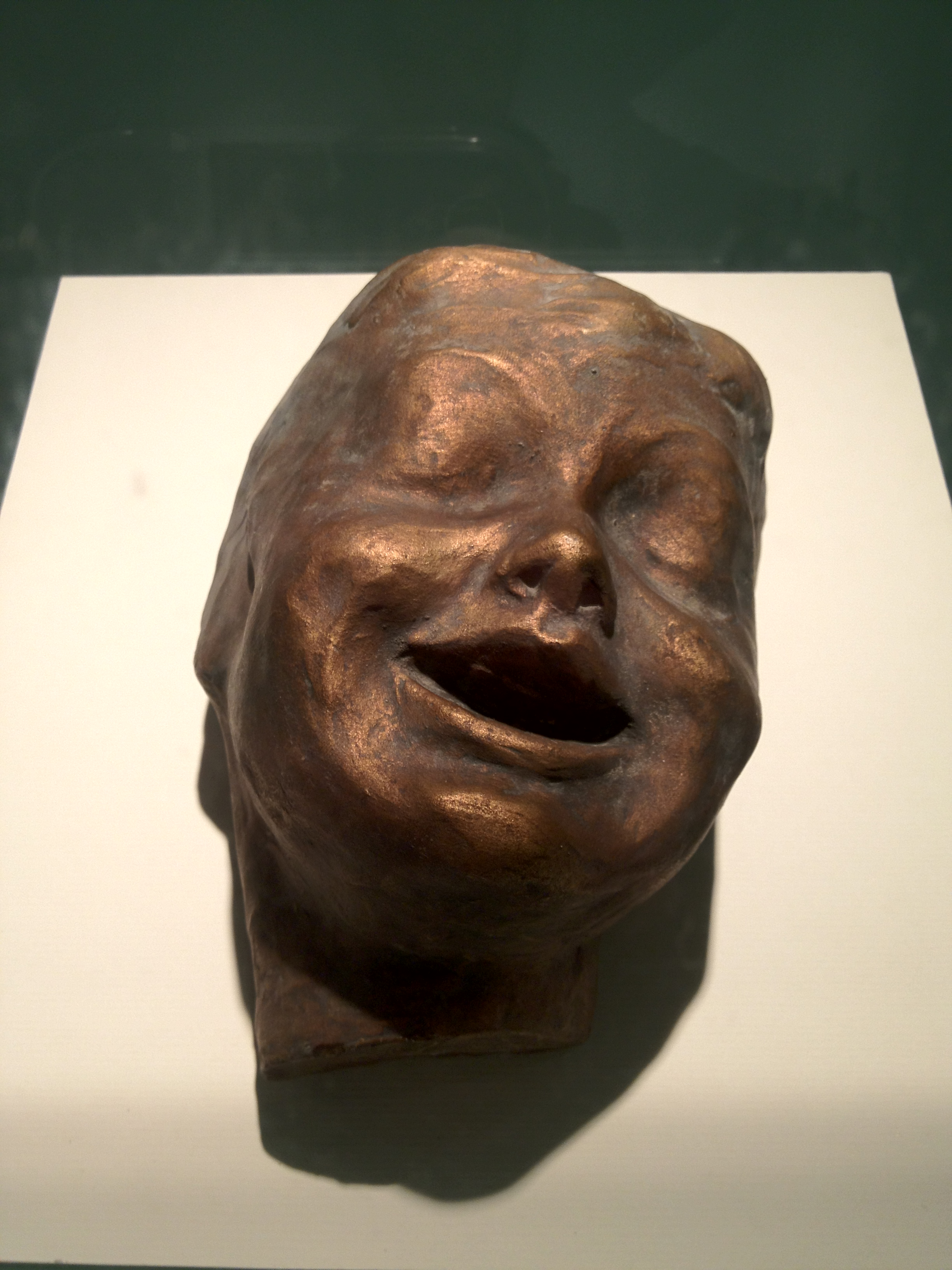
sculpture of Angelika Schatz' face by Boris Schatz

Angelika Schatz was the daughter of Boris Schatz, a well-known Israeli artist, and Zhenia Zhermovsky, his first wife, she was born in Sofia, Bulgaria. When she was six, her mother left her father to go to Paris with Andrej Nikolow, one of her father's students, and took her daughter with her. Schatz went on to study art at an academy in Germany.

In 1919, Schatz married Robert Meerson. The couple lived in Hamburg, later moving to Paris. In 1923, they moved to Berlin; they had their only child, a son, there. In 1925, the couple moved to Prague, where they stayed for ten years. She spent some time in Paris in 1928. Around 1940, Schatz and her husband divorced. During World War II, both Schatz and her son were interned for a time in labor camps. In January 1948, she went to Israel with her son. Schatz married Dan Schneider in 1951. She joined the Association of Painters and Sculptors in Tel Aviv and continued to paint but was not otherwise well-connected with the local art scene. She died in Tel Aviv at the age of 78 and was buried in Kiryat Shaul Cemetery.

== Art career ==
In 1932, she won a gold medal at the Grand Prix, an art show in Paris. Schatz also had exhibitions in Bulgaria and Czechoslovakia. The family later moved to Sofia, where Schatz was part of a group of female artists and also published articles as an art critic.

== See also ==
- Visual arts in Israel
