= Stefan Valev =

Stefan Nikolov Valev (Bulgarian: Стефан Николов Вълев [ˈstɛfɐn ˈnikolof ˈvɤlɛf]; 10 April 1935 – 3 March 2009) was a Bulgarian graphic, industrial designer and illustrator, one of the founders of the Bulgarian industrial design.

He was born in Radnevo, a town next to Stara Zagora in the southern Bulgaria (then the Kingdom of Bulgaria). His father Nicolas Valev was a pharmacist who emigrated in 1946 to Switzerland for political reasons. The rest of the family was not allowed to leave Bulgaria and was politically repressed by the communist dictature. In 1956 Stephane was sent to one of the communist concentration camps Belene located on the Persin Island, Danube river, where he has spent 14 months. He then enrolled at the National Academy of Art in the capital Sofia, and after being twice expelled from there as politically incompatible with the communist political dogma, he was finally allowed to finish his studies of mural painting under Georgi Bogdanov.

After completing his obligatory military service Stephane Valev worked for several years as free-lance illustrator and graphic artist until he has joined the Central Institute for Industrial Esthetic (in Bulgarian Централен Институт за Промишлена Естетика, ЦИПЕ) in Sofia. There he worked as a graphic artist, art director and industrial designer among a group of young and talented artists, designers and engineers. In 1965 he was promoted to head of the "Visual information and industrial graphic" department, later renamed to "Information" department and he held this position till 1990. Creator of various installations and decorative elements in the National Palace of Culture and The Funeral House in Sofia, hundreds of logos, illustrations, posters, industrial design etc. He was also the designer of the first Bulgarian car called Moto-coupé (Bulgarian: Мото-купе) and other products of the daily life. He has many publications in the bulletin "Design" of the CIIE (Central Institute for Industrial Esthetic), in the magazine "Industrial design and decorative art" (Bulgarian: "Промишлена естетика и декоративно изкуство") etc. He has rebuilt the graphic identity of the State Agency for the Bulgarians Abroad and its magazine "Echo".

His professionalism has helped him to be selected as member of several State commissions, and he was chairman of the State commission of the Design (Bulgarian: Ведомствена комисия по дизайн). He was awarded with the State award "Golden hands" (Bulgarian: Награда "Златни ръце") and other insignias of honour.

In 2008 he publishes a contemporary poetry book called "The altar of destruction" (Bulgarian: Олтара на опустошението) (ISBN 978-954-427-778-9), illustrated by himself.
