= Lyuben Zidarov =

Bulgarian illustrator and painter (1923–2023)

- Любен Зидаров
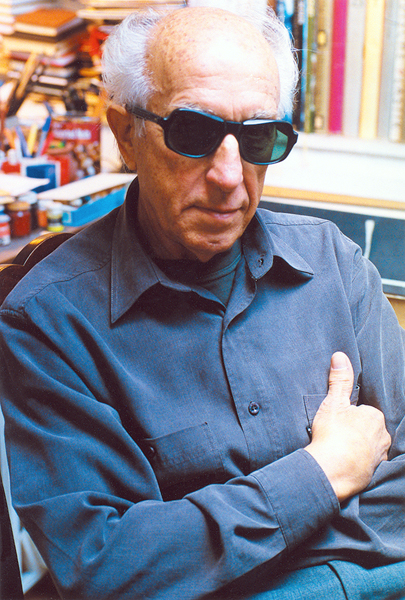
- Zidarov in 2010
- Born: Lyuben Hristov Zidarov; 23 December 1923; Veliko Tarnovo, Kingdom of Bulgaria
- Died: 3 January 2023 (aged 99); Bulgaria
- Other name: Luben Zidarov
- Occupation: Illustrator

Lyuben Hristov Zidarov (Bulgarian: Любен Христов Зидаров; 23 December 1923 – 3 January 2023) was a Bulgarian illustrator and painter.

== Life and career ==
Born in Veliko Tarnovo, Zidarov got a passion for drawing since his school years, and in the late 1930s he created some of the first Bulgarian comic strips. He studied painting at the National Academy of Art in Sofia, graduating in 1948. In 1950 he started his activity as an illustrator, collaborating with the children publications Septemvriiche and Slaveyche. He then specialized in illustrating books, including novels by Mark Twain, Robert Louis Stevenson, Jules Verne, Oscar Wilde, Alexandre Dumas and collections of Hans Christian Andersen's fairy tales.

During his career Zidarov illustrated over 200 books and was the recipient of numerous awards and accolades, notably the Golden Age Medal from the Bulgarian Ministry of Culture, the Order of Saints Cyril and Methodius (first grade) and the title of People's Artist of Bulgary. Among his last high-profile assignments were the cover art illustrations of the Bulgarian 20th Anniversary edition of the Harry Potter book series in 2019. He died on 3 January 2023, at the age of 99.
