= Bezalel school =

Art movement in Palestine

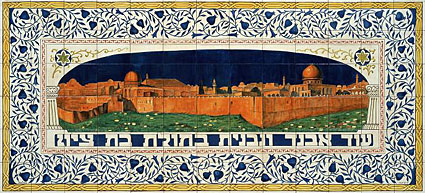
Bezalel school ceramic tile, 1920s

The Bezalel academy was founded as an art movement in Palestine in the late Ottoman empire and British Mandate periods. The name Bezalel was chosen from the Bible, he was a master craftsman, specifically the chief artisan of the Tabernacle, a portable sanctuary built during the Israelites' journey through the desert. The school originally named for the Bezalel Art School, predecessor of the Bezalel Academy of Art and Design, it has been described as "a fusion of oriental art and Art Nouveau." Boris Schatz, the father of Israeli art, founded the Bezalel academy of art, design and architecture in 1906 in Jerusalem. He aimed to establish an institution that combined education and craftsmanship, merging Eastern and Western cultures, a place to work and study.

== History ==
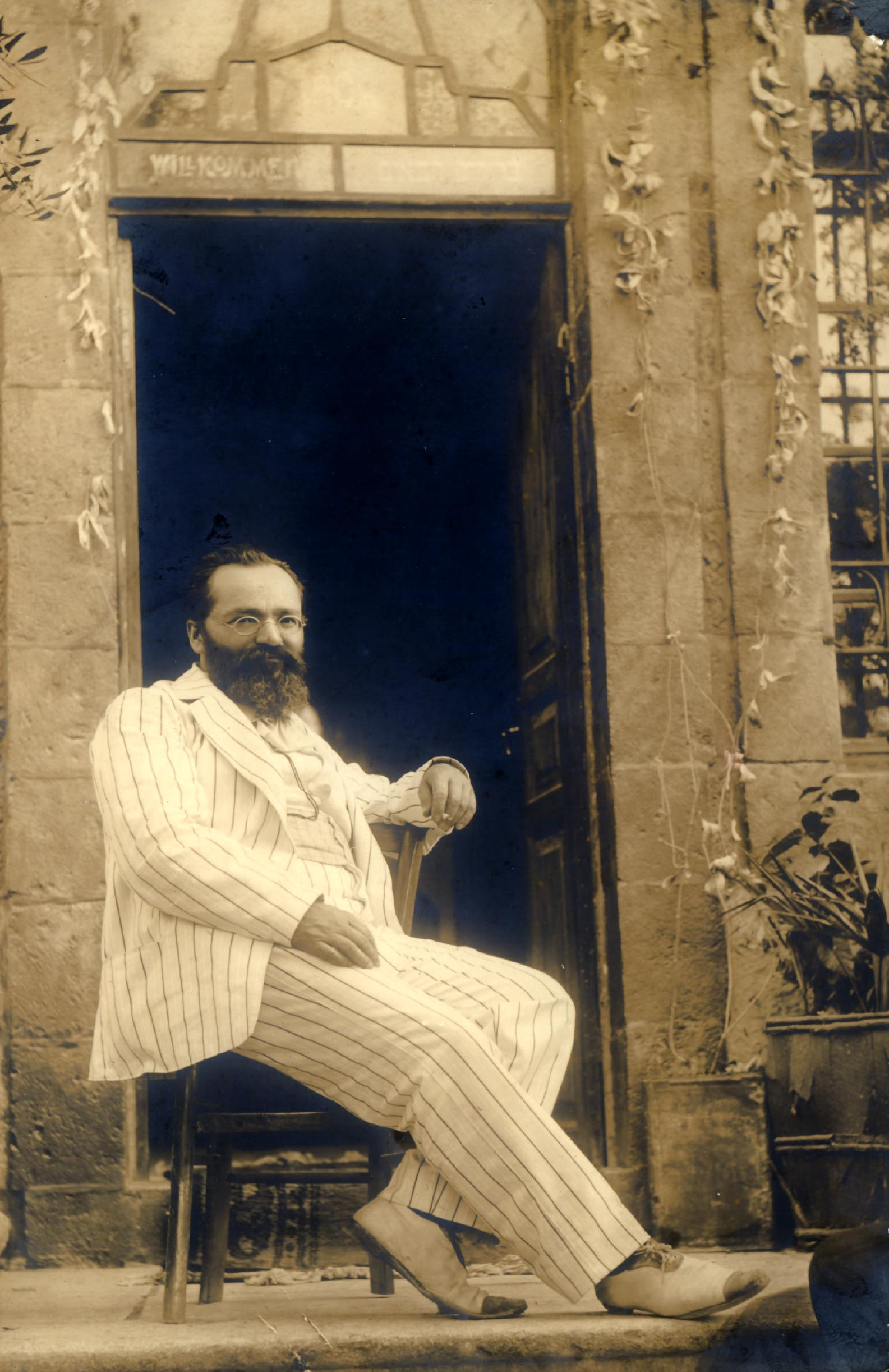
Boris Schatz

Although Jewish art in Mandatory Palestine has a history that reaches back to at least the mid-19th century, the commonly held view when the Bezalel Art School was founded generally dismissed earlier works as being of little value. One author wrote that "every historical survey of contemporary Israeli art must begin with Boris Schatz and with the establishment of the Bezalel School." Another commented that "Schatz was first among the pioneers who attempted to create a Jewish Art, indeed a Palestinian Art". Yona Fischer has said that Bezalel is not the beginning of Jewish art and craft in Israel but that it is, considered within the historical context of Zionism, a movement that "divides past and future" of an emerging Israel "searching its own definition".

== Style and themes ==
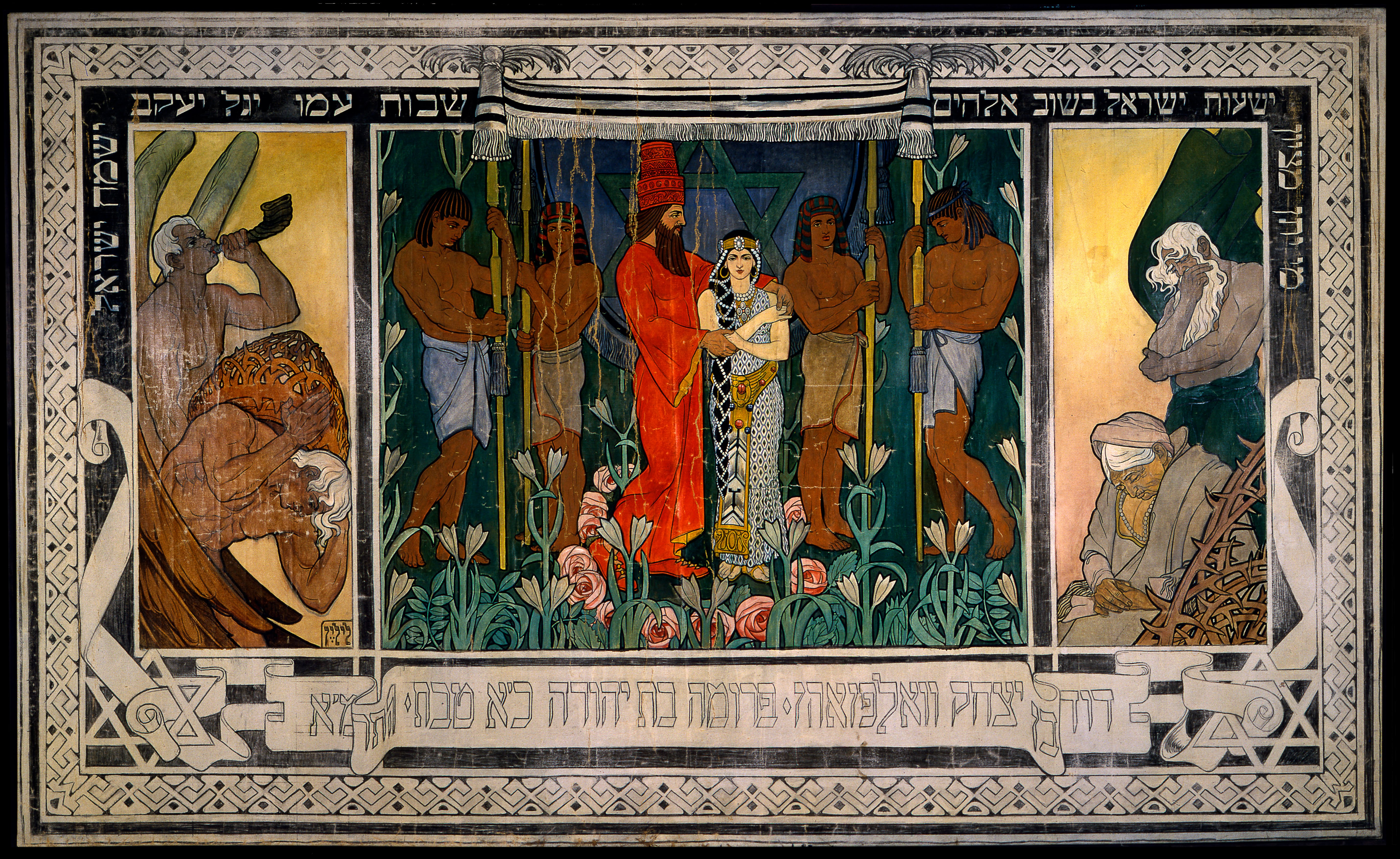
An Allegorical Wedding: Sketch for a carpet (Triptych from right to left): Exile, Marriage, Redemption, 1906, by Ephraim Moses Lilien

The Bezalel school artists blended varied strands of surroundings, tradition and innovation in paintings and craft objects that invoked biblical themes, Islamic design and European traditions in their effort to carve out a distinctive style of Jewish art for the new nation planned in the ancient Jewish homeland. The works of art created by the group contributed significantly to the creation of a distinctive Israeli national culture.

The founder of the school was Boris Schatz, who left his position as head of the Royal Academy of Arts in Sofia, Bulgaria, to make aliyah in 1906 and established an academy for Jewish arts in Jerusalem. The artists were Zionist immigrants from Europe and the Middle East, with all the psychological and social upheaval that this implies. The movement developed a distinctive style combining Biblical and Zionist subjects with Art Nouveau, symbolism and traditional Persian and Syrian artistry.

The Bezalel School produced decorative art objects in a wide range of materials: silver, leather, wood, brass and fabric. While the artists and designers were European-trained, the craftsmen who executed the works were often members of the Yemenite Jewish community, which had a long tradition of craftsmanship in precious metals, and began to make aliyah about 1880. In Yemen, filigree jewelry making was a respected profession among the Jews, with cultural as well as religious applications. Yemenite Jewish silversmiths worked primarily with silver, creating pieces by hand using traditional methods. Yemenite immigrants wearing colorful traditional costumes were also frequent subjects of Bezalel School artists.

Leading members of the school were Boris Schatz, E. M. Lilien, Ya'akov Stark, Meir Gur-Aryeh, Ze'ev Raban, Jacob Eisenberg, Jacob Steinhardt, Shmuel Ben David, and Hermann Struck.

The artists produced not only paintings and etchings, but also objects sold as Judaica and souvenirs. In 1915, The New York Times praised the “Exquisite examples of filigree work, copper inlay, carving in ivory and in wood,” in a touring exhibit.

In the metalwork Moorish patterns predominated, and the damascene work, in particular, showed both artistic feeling and skill in execution.

== See also ==
- Visual arts in Israel
