= Ephraim Moses Lilien =

Jewish artist and member of Bezalel school movement (1874–1925)

Ephraim Moses Lilien אפרים משה ליליין
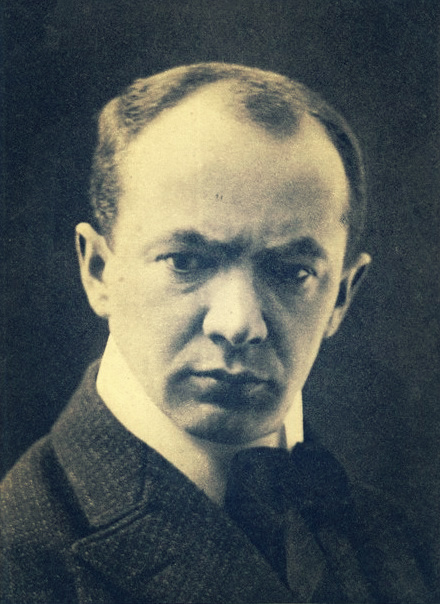
- Born: Maurycy Lilien; 23 May 1874; Drohobycz, Galicia, Austro-Hungarian Empire (modern Drohobych, Ukraine)
- Died: 18 July 1925 (age 51); Badenweiler, Republic of Baden, Weimar Republic
- Education: Academy of Arts in Kraków; Academy of Fine Arts Vienna
- Known for: Illustrator and print-maker
- Movement: Bezalel school

Maurycy "Ephraim Moses" Lilien (Polish: [mawˈrɨt͡sɨ ˈliljɛn]; Hebrew: אפרים משה ליליין; 23 May 1874 – 18 July 1925) was a Polish-Jewish Art Nouveau illustrator and printmaker particularly noted for his art on Jewish themes and his influence on the Bezalel school art movement. He is sometimes called the "first Zionist artist."

== Biography ==
Maurycy Lilien was born in 1874 in Drohobycz, Galicia, then in the Austro-Hungarian Empire. In 1889–1893, Lilien learned painting and graphic techniques at the Academy of Arts in Kraków. He studied under Polish painter Jan Matejko from 1890 to 1892.

As a member of the Early Zionist Movement, Lilien traveled to Ottoman Palestine several times between 1906 and 1918, but did not settle.

Lilien attended the Fifth Zionist Congress, held in Basel, as a member of the Democratic Fraction — a group formed in opposition to the Religious Zionist, General Zionist, and Revisionist Zionist factions through its support for developing a secular national culture. In 1905, at the Seventh Zionist Congress, in Basel, he, along with Boris Schatz, became a member of a committee formed to help establish the Bezalel Art School. As part of that work he accompanied Schatz to Jerusalem to gather inspiration.

== Art career ==
Lilien was one of the two artists to accompany Boris Schatz to what is now Israel in 1906 for the purpose of establishing Bezalel Academy of Arts and Design, and taught the school's first class in 1906. Although his stay in the country was short-lived, he left his indelible stamp on the creation of an Eretz Israel style, placing biblical subjects in the Zionist context and oriental settings, conceived in an idealized Western design. In the first two decades of the century, Lilien's work served as a model for the Bezalel group.

Lilien is known for his famous photographic portrait of Theodor Herzl. He often used Herzl as a model, considering his features a perfect representation of the "New Jew." In 1896, he received an award for photography from the avant-garde magazine Jugend. Lilien illustrated several books. In 1923, an exhibition of his work opened in New York.

Lilien's illustrated books include Juda (1900), Biblically themed poetry by Lilien's Christian friend, Börries Freiherr von Münchhausen, and Lieder des Ghetto (Songs of the Ghetto) (1903), Yiddish poems by Morris Rosenfeld translated into German.

Lilien died in Badenweiler, Germany in 1925. A street in the Nayot neighborhood of Jerusalem is named for him.

== Gallery ==
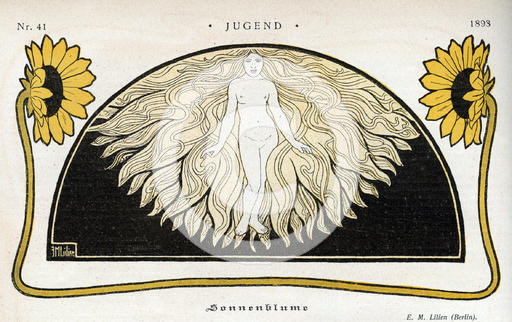
"Sunflower" (Sonnenblume), Jugend, Berlin, 1893

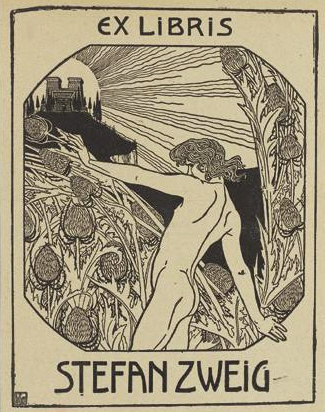
Ex libris Stefan Zweig c. 1900

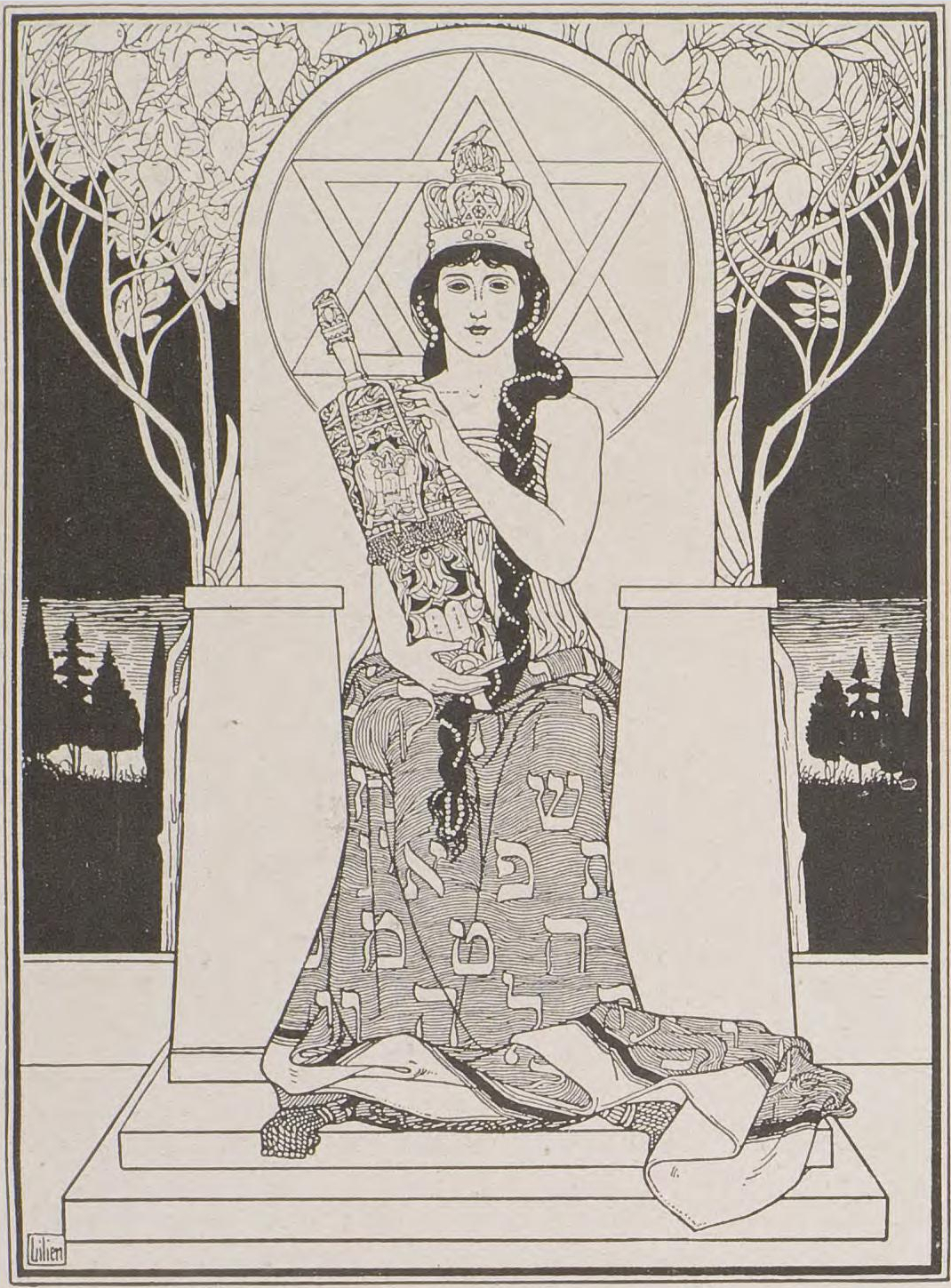
"The Queen of Sabbath", from Juda, Berlin, 1900-1

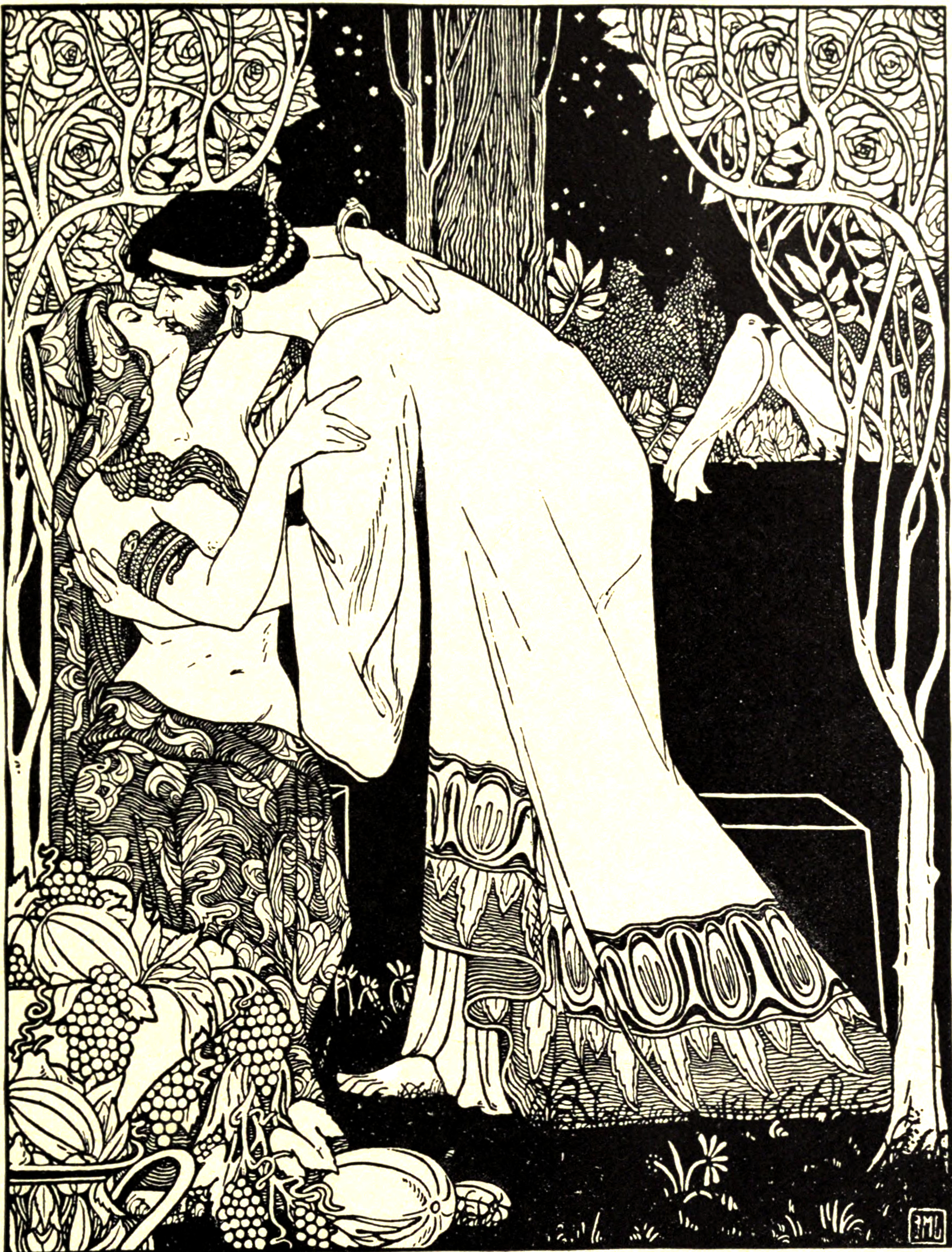
"The Silent Song" from Juda, 1900–1.

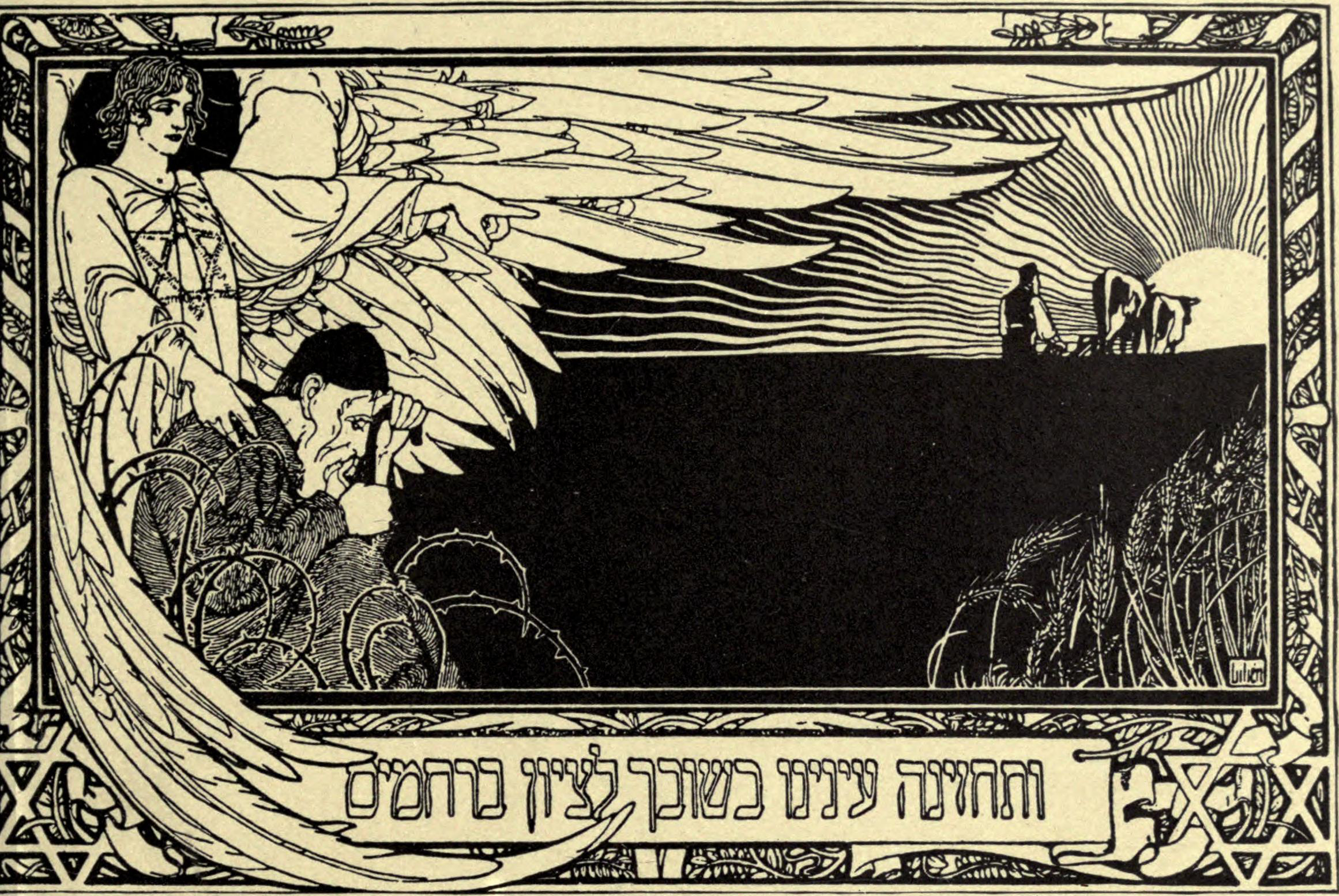
May our eyes behold your return in mercy to Zion, Fifth Zionist Congress souvenir, Basel, 1901.

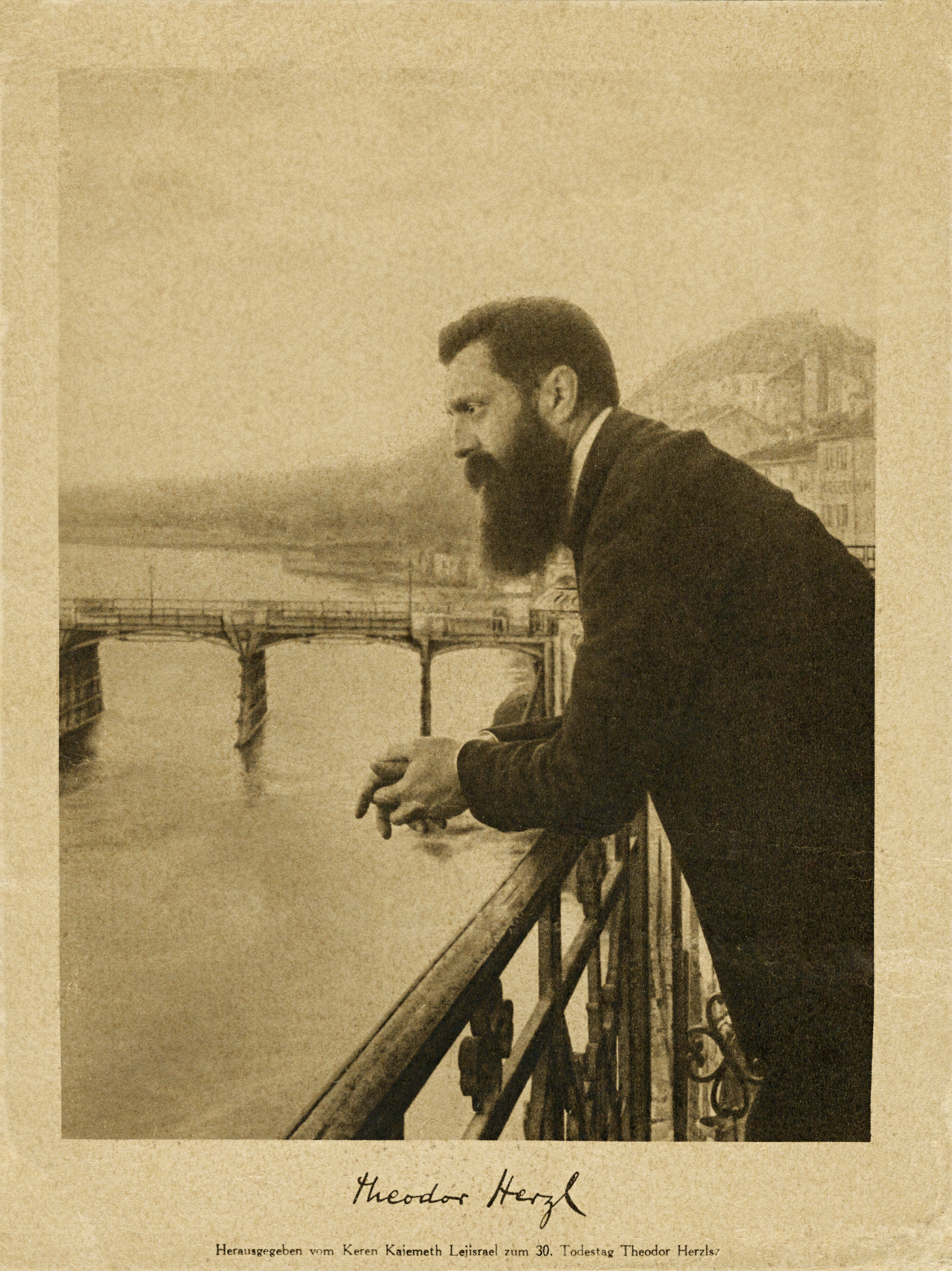
Theodor Herzl in Basel, 1901

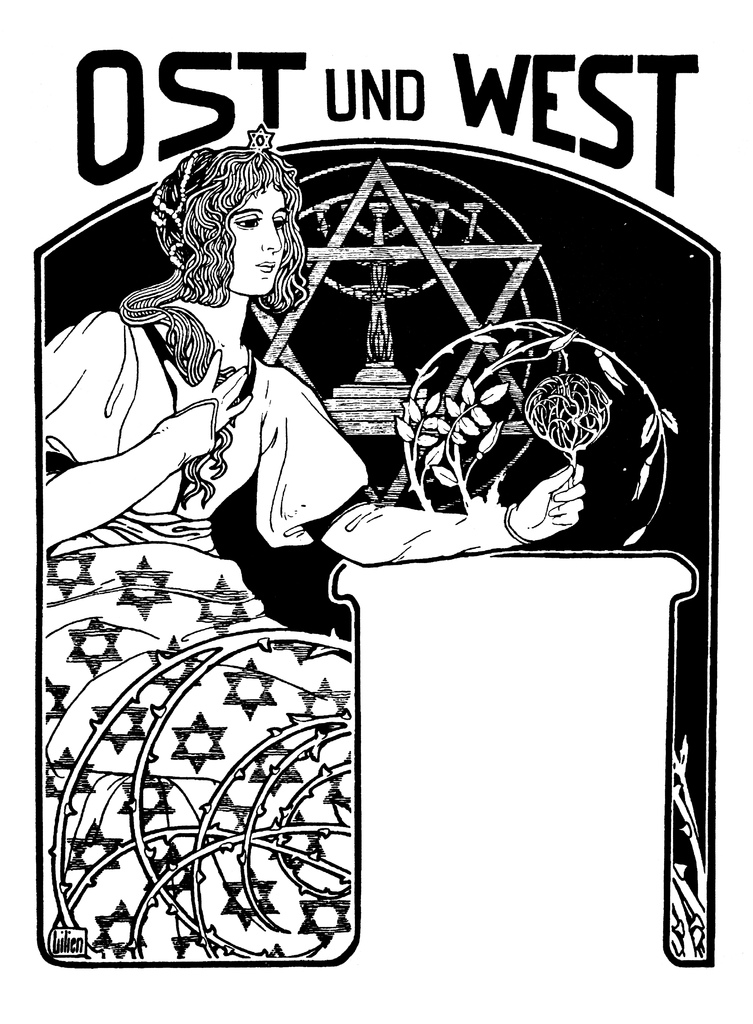
Ost und West, 1903

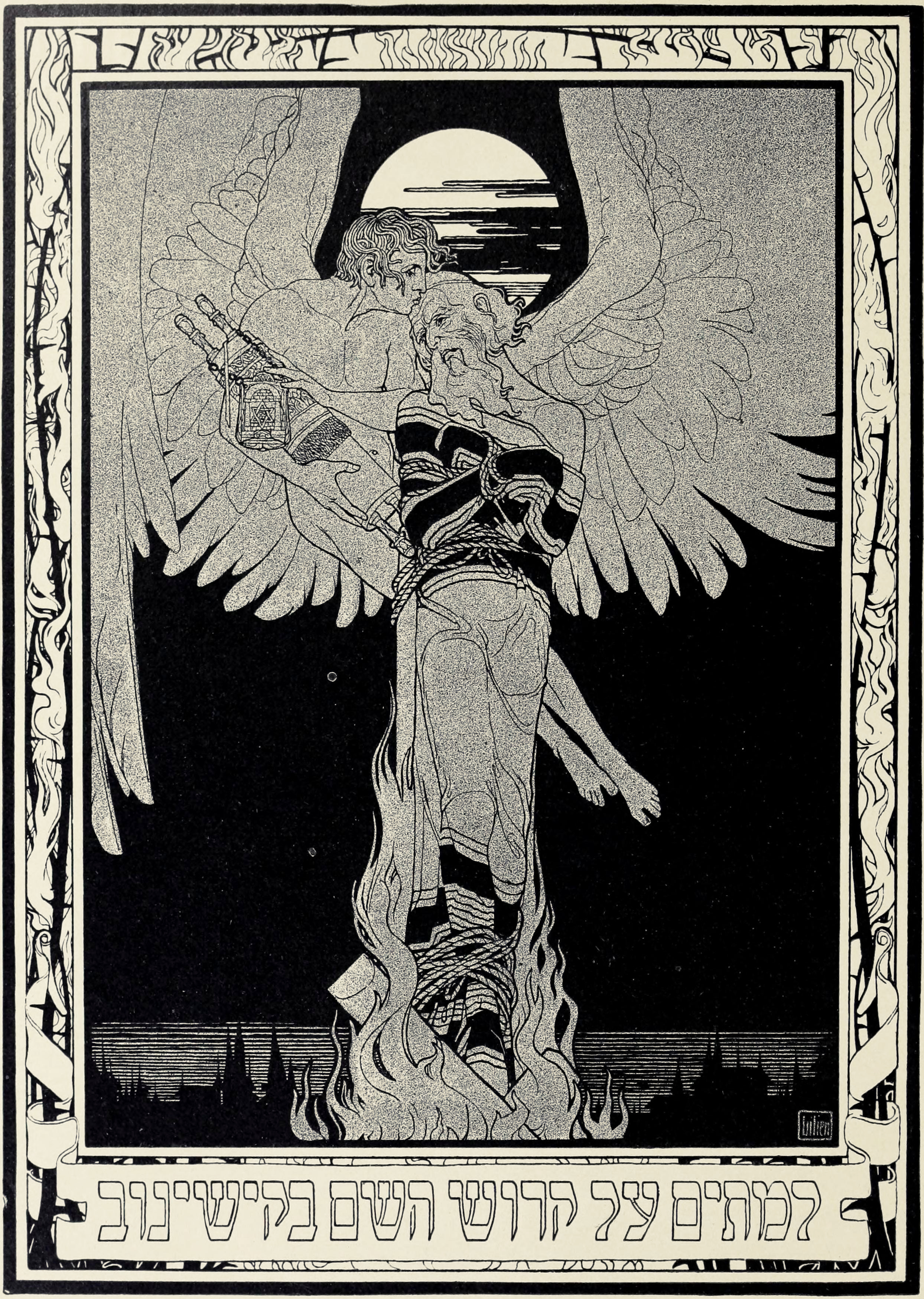
Homage to the victims of the first Chișinău pogrom, 1903.

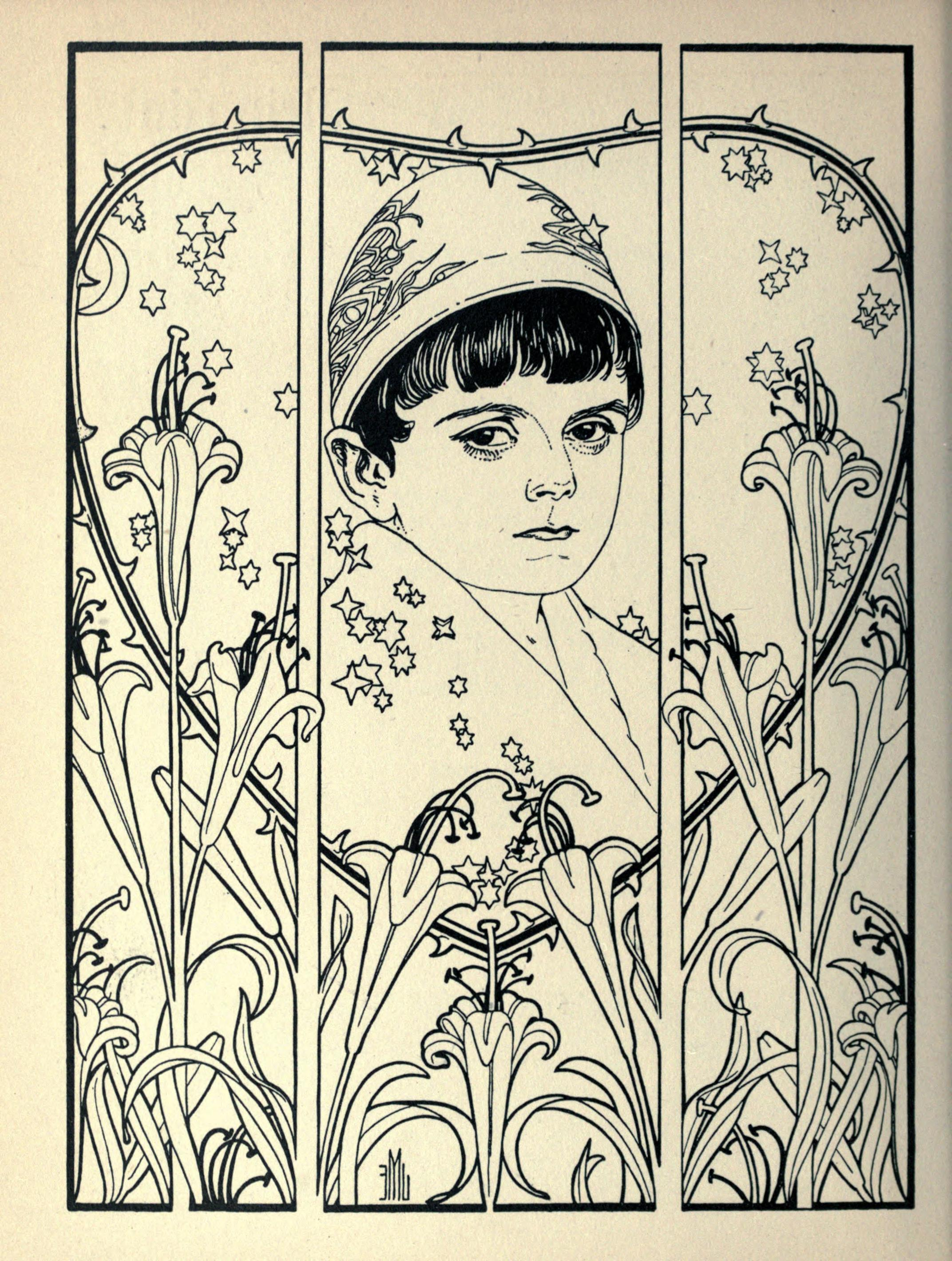
Jewish child from Lieder des Ghetto, 1903

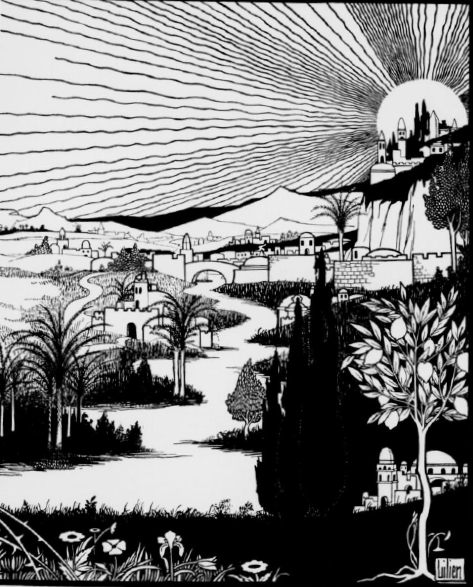
"Zion", Lieder des Ghetto, 1903

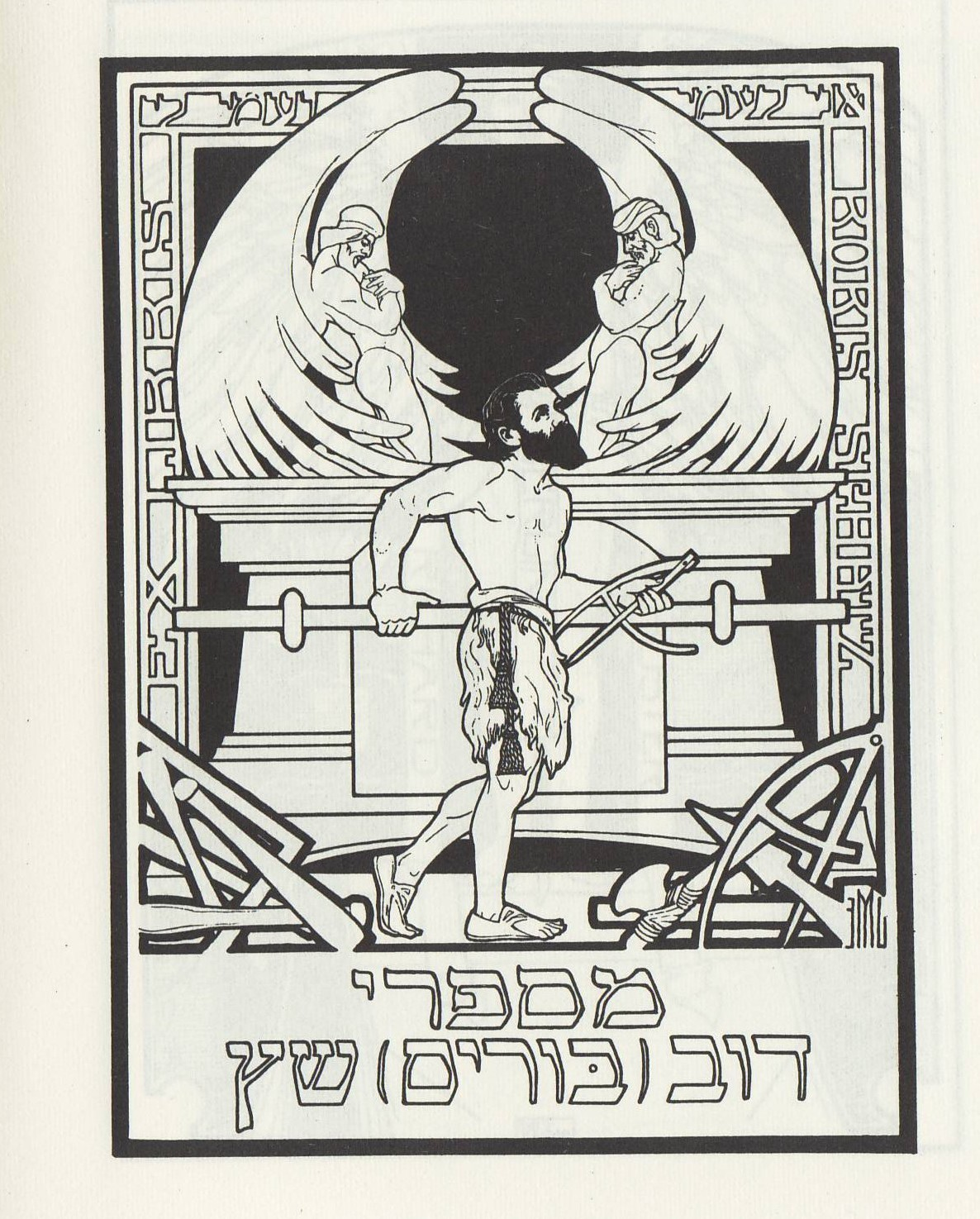
Ex libris Boris Schatz, 1905

Emblem of the Bezalel Academy of Arts and Design, Jerusalem, 1906

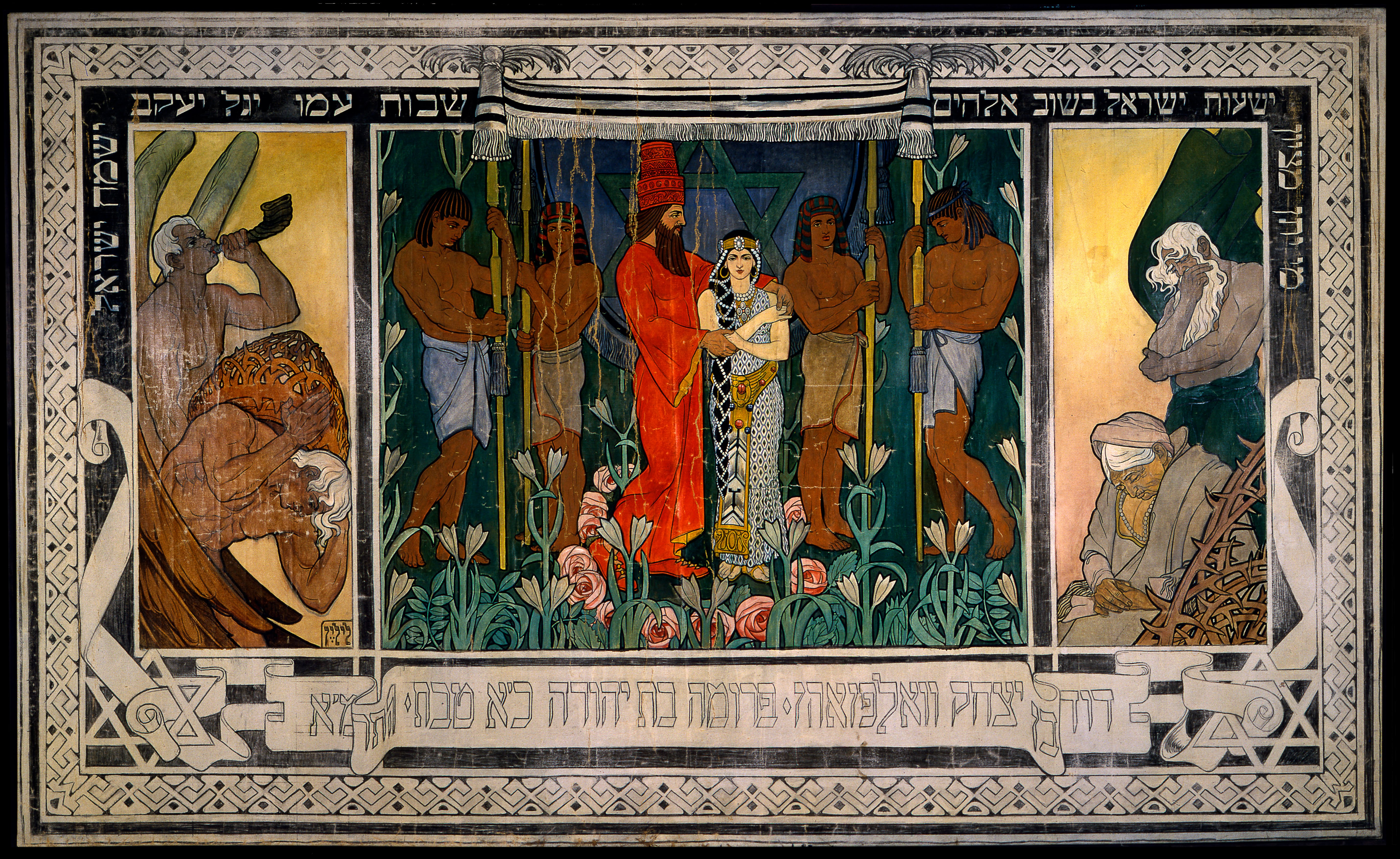
An Allegorical Wedding: Sketch for a carpet Triptych (from right to left): Exile, Marriage, Redemption, 1906

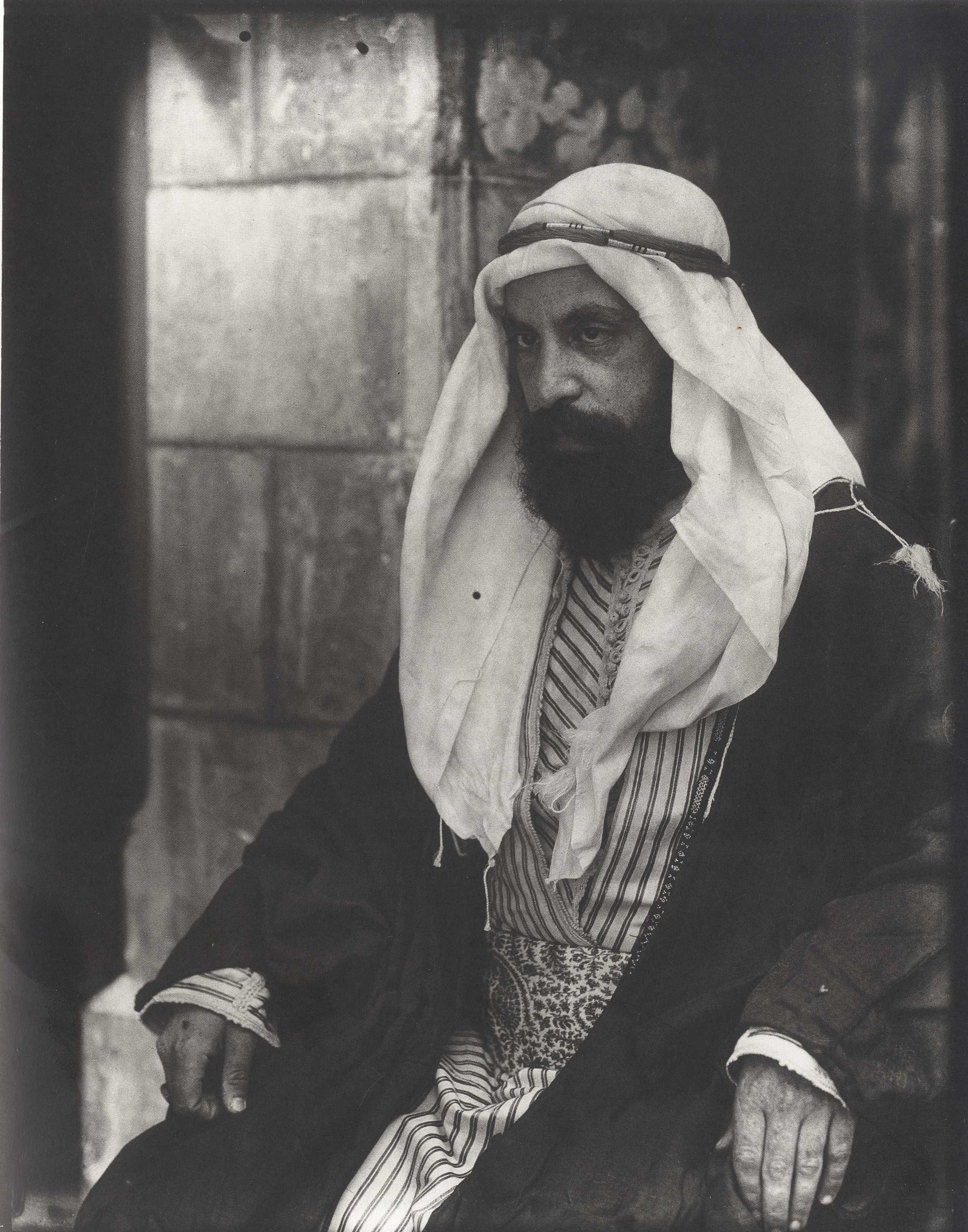
Theodor Herzl dressed as an Arab, 1906

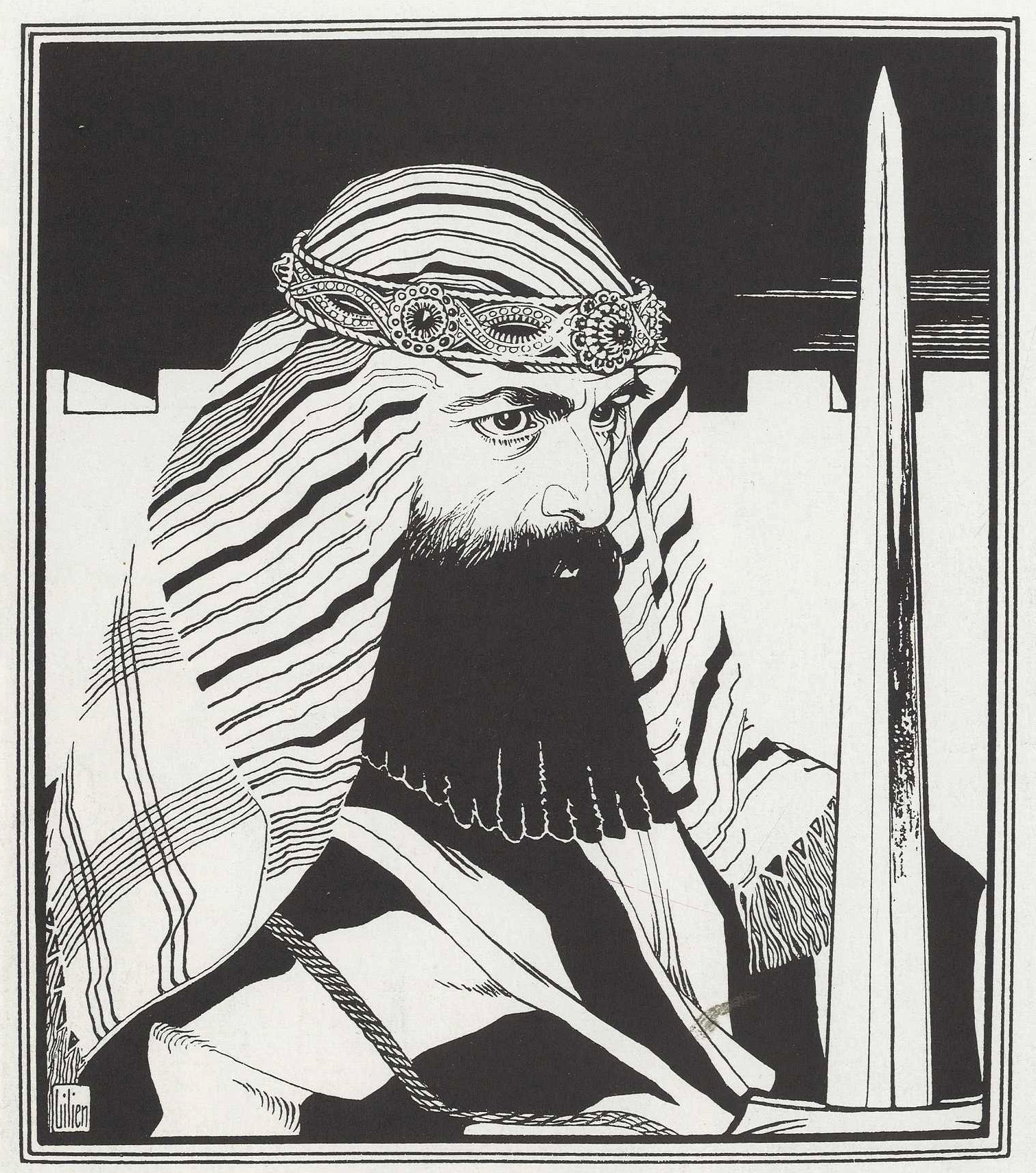
Joshua, 1908

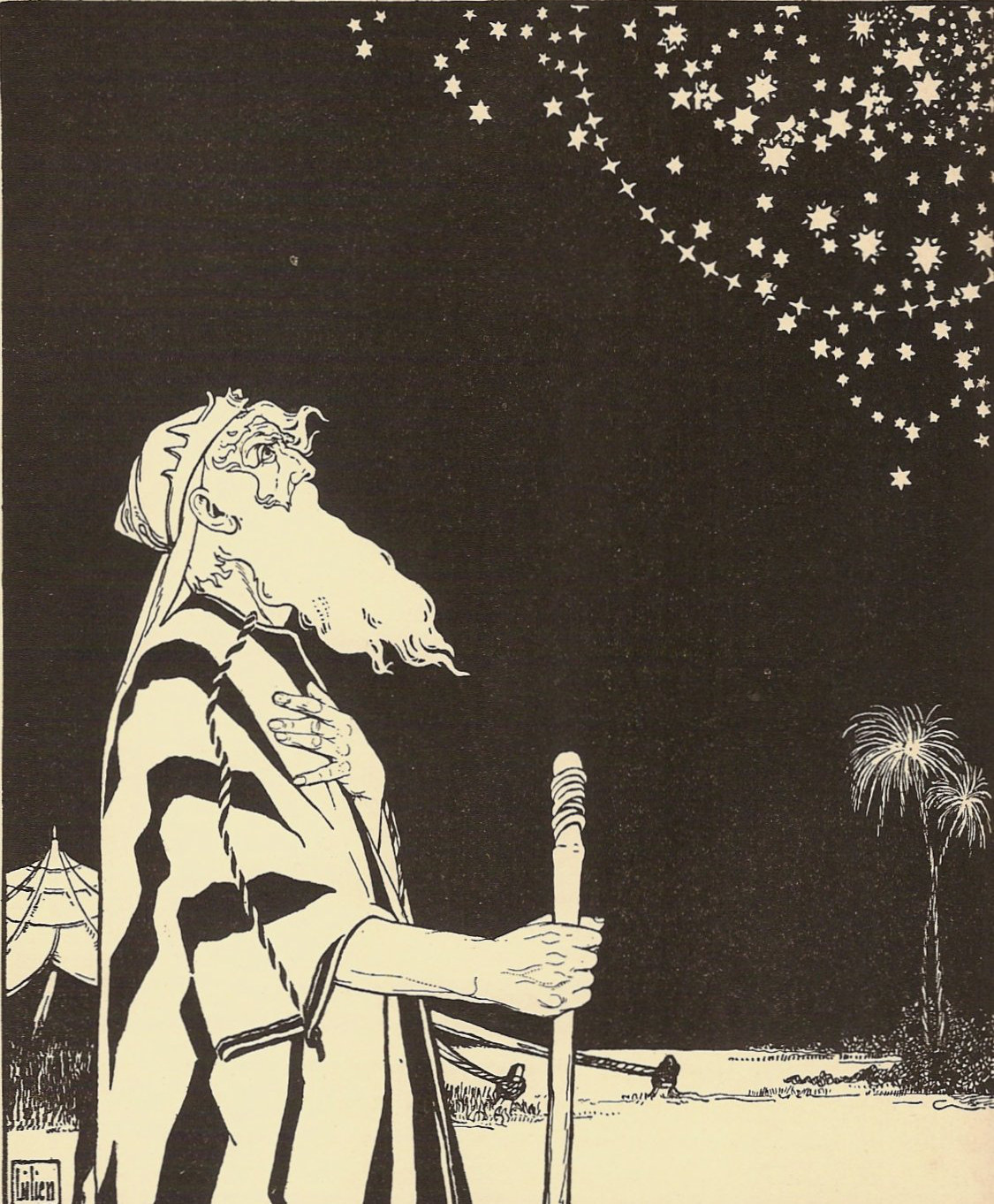
Abraham, 1908

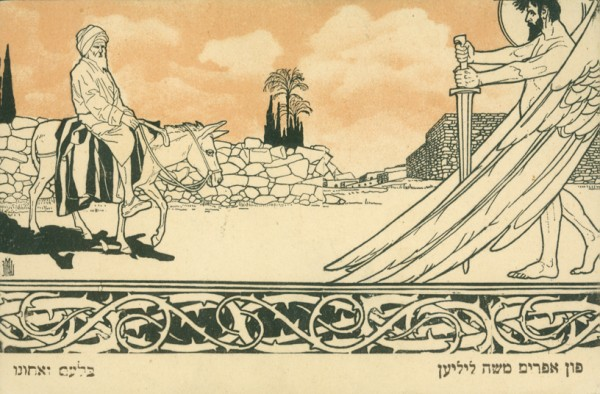
Balaam, [1908]

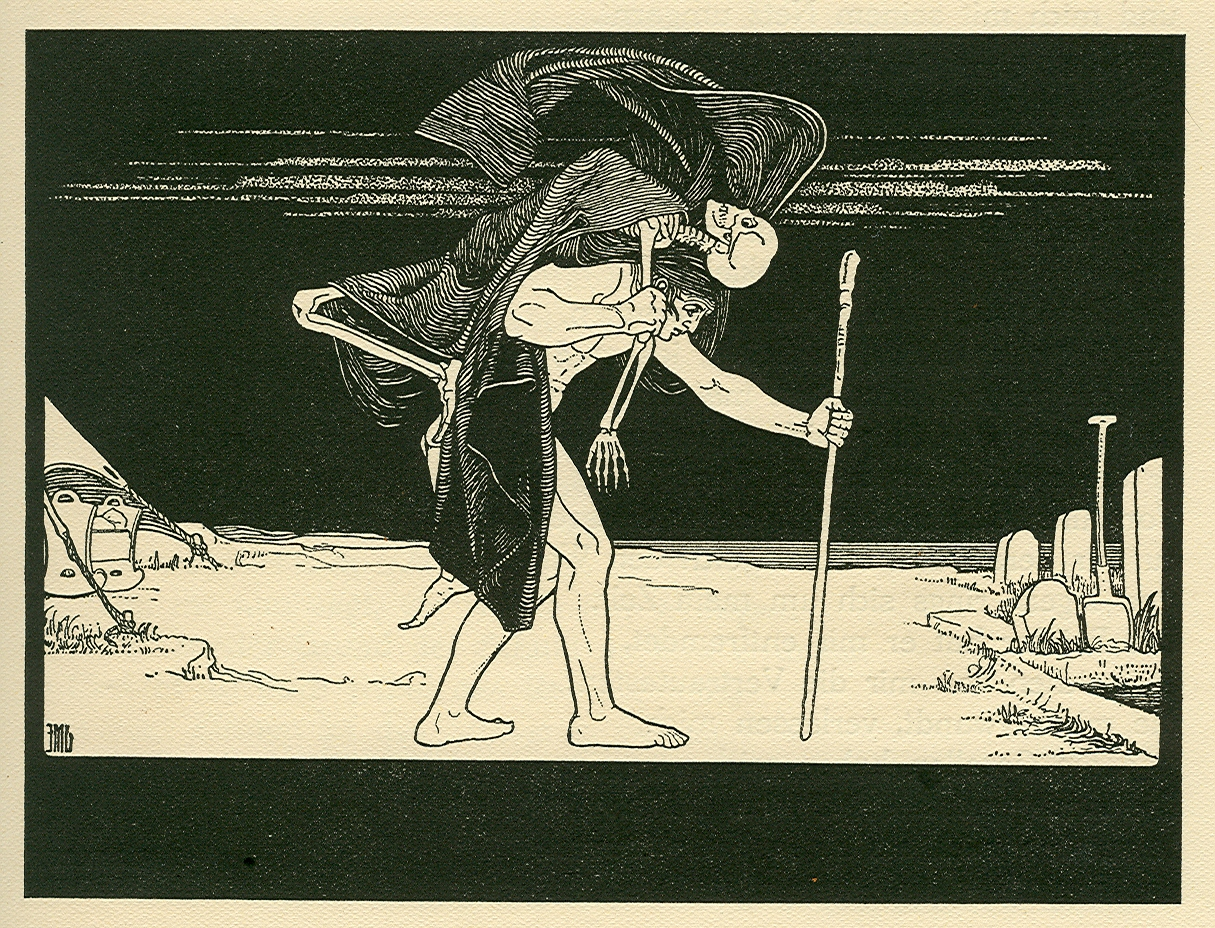
Dybbuk, [1908]

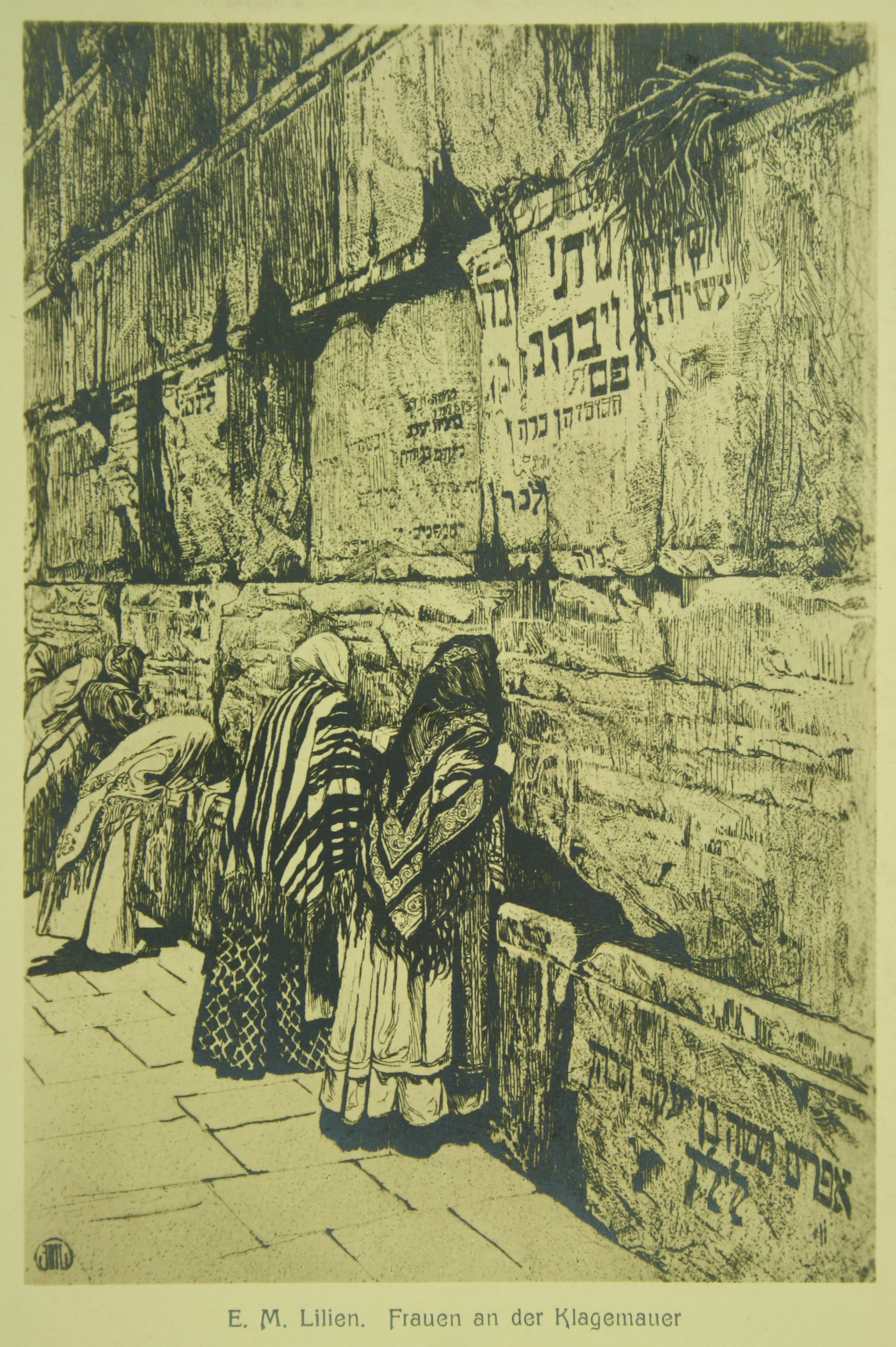
Kotel (Western Wall), 1910

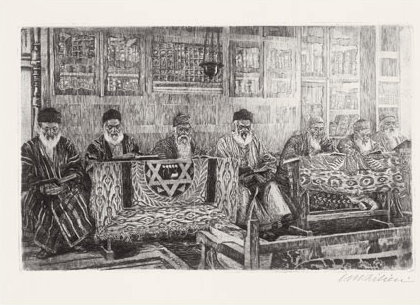
In the Library, engraving, 1915

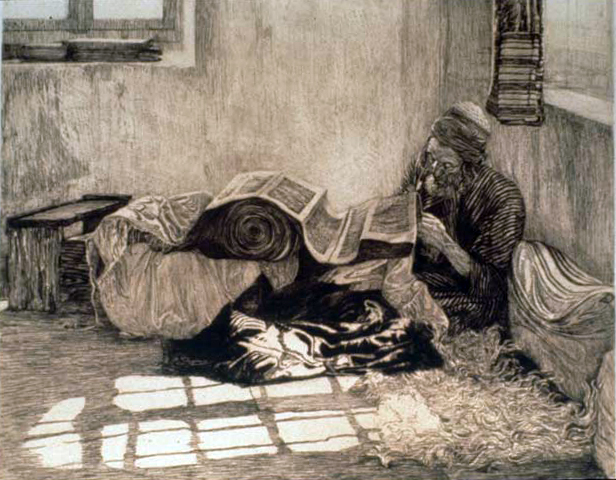
Sofer of the Torah, sewing its parchments, engraving, 1915

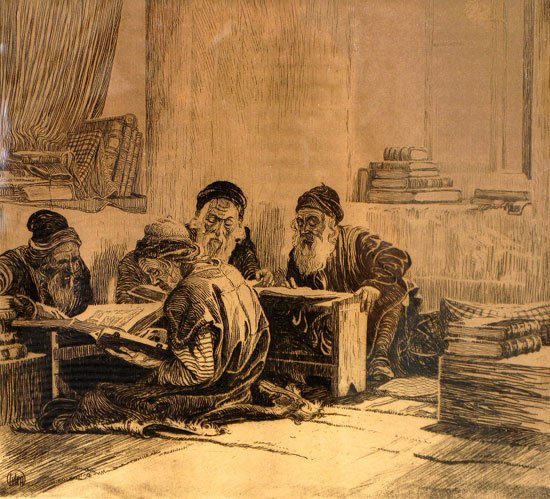
Learning Talmud, engraving, 1915

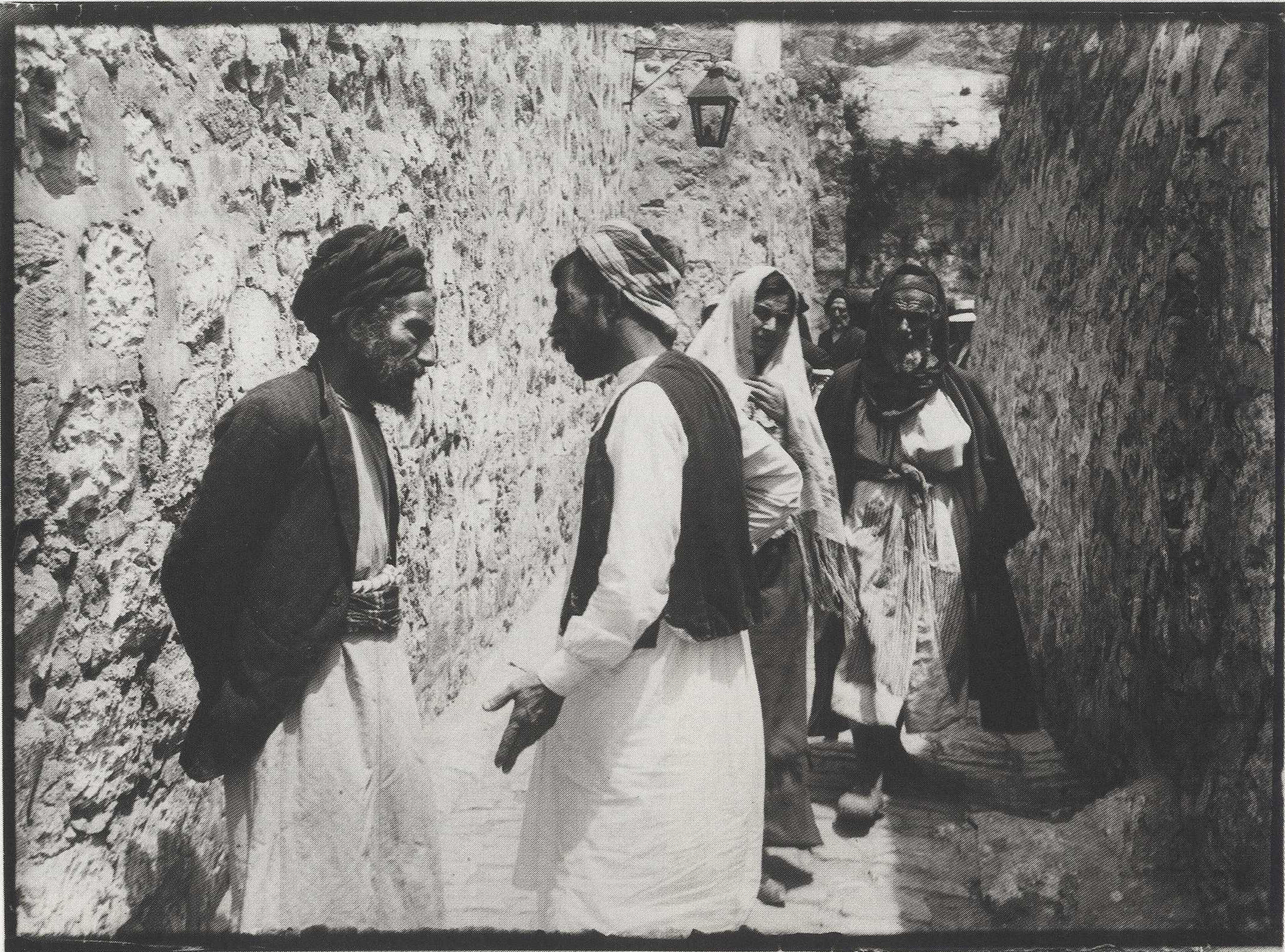
Figures, photograph, c. 1918

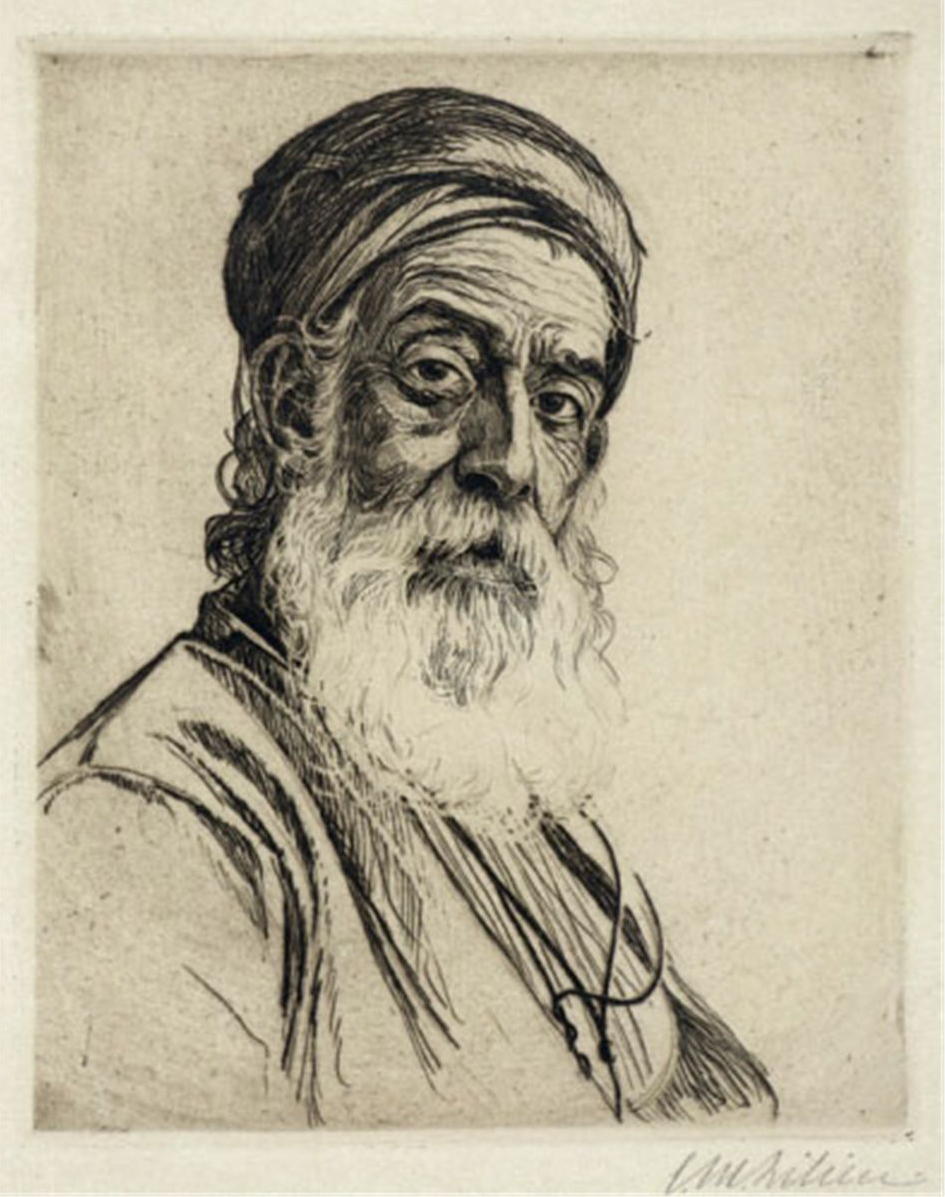
The Samaritan, engraving, c. 1920
