= Dionisii Donchev =

Bulgarian fine artist

Dionisii Donchev (Bulgarian: Дионисий Дончев) (born April 9, 1935) is one of the prominent Bulgarian fine artists. Honorary citizen of his home town of Pleven, Bulgaria, where he still lives and works. He graduated from the National Academy of Art in Sofia in professor Ilia Petrov's class. He took active part in the creation of the famous epic art project in his home town of Pleven - 'Parorama' in 1977. He has accumulated more than half a century of experience in the creation of portraits, landscapes, compositions, nudes and still life. His favorite medium is oil on canvas. His artwork has enjoyed presence in galleries and private collections in Bulgaria and abroad.
