= National Academy of Art =

Art academy in Sofia, Bulgaria

Coordinates: 42°41′41″N 23°20′4″E

- Национална художествена академия
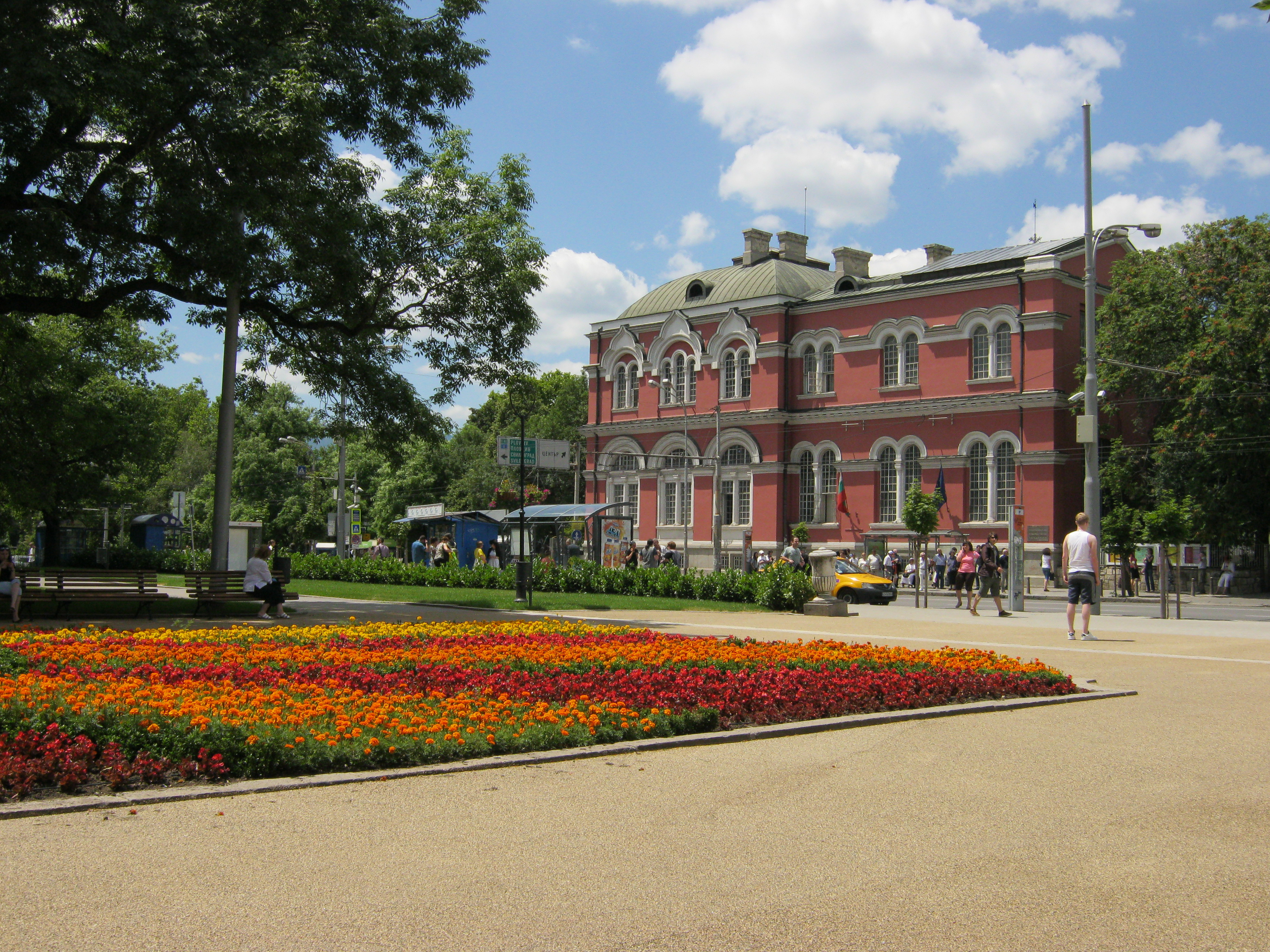
- Main building of the National Academy of Art in Sofia
- Former names: State School of Drawing; Academy of Art
- Type: Public
- Established: 1896; 130 years ago
- Rector: Georgi Iankov
- Students: nearly 1,000
- Location: Sofia, Bulgaria
- Website: www.nha.bg

The National Academy of Art (Bulgarian: Национална художествена академия) is a public institution of higher education in Sofia, Bulgaria, specializing in fine arts, applied arts, design, conservation and restoration, and the history and theory of art. Founded in 1896 as the State School of Drawing, it is Bulgaria's oldest higher-education institution devoted to professional art training.

The academy is organized into the Faculty of Fine Arts and the Faculty of Applied Arts and Design and offers bachelor's, master's and doctoral programmes.

== History ==
The institution was founded as the State School of Drawing in 1896. Its establishment was associated with artists Anton Mitov, Ivan Mrkvička and Boris Schatz, and with writers and public figures Konstantin Velichkov and Ivan Shishmanov. The school opened in Sofia in October 1896 following a decree signed by Prince Ferdinand.

In 1911, the teaching staff submitted a development plan to the Ministry of Education proposing that the State School of Drawing be renamed the Academy of Art. The change was made in 1921 following a proposal by Minister of Education Stoyan Omarchevski. The institution later became the present National Academy of Art.

== Academics and structure ==
The National Academy of Art has two faculties: the Faculty of Fine Arts and the Faculty of Applied Arts and Design. The faculties administer programmes leading to bachelor's, master's and doctoral degrees. The academy educates nearly 1,000 Bulgarian and international students and doctoral candidates.

Its programmes cover disciplines including painting, sculpture, printmaking, mural painting, illustration and book design, poster and visual communication, industrial design, fashion, textiles, ceramics, scenography, metalwork, woodcarving, conservation and restoration, and art history and theory.

== Notable alumni and students ==
The academy and its predecessor institutions have educated numerous prominent Bulgarian and international artists. The list includes both graduates and notable former students who studied at the institution without completing a degree there.

Name	Field	Academy education	Year(s)
Alexander Bozhinov	Painting, illustration and caricature	Member of the first class of the State School of Drawing.	1896
Andrey Nikolov	Sculpture	Member of the first class of the State School of Drawing.	1896
Shmuel Ben David	Painting, illustration and design	Studied art in Sofia under Boris Schatz before moving to Jerusalem in 1906.	before 1906
Nikolai Rainov	Painting, writing and art history	Studied at the State School of Drawing.	1909–1911
Vladimir Dimitrov	Painting	Completed his diploma work at the State School of Drawing.	1910
Vera Nedkova	Painting	Studied in Nikola Marinov's painting course before continuing her education in Vienna.	1923–1924
Ivan Milev	Painting and stage design	Graduate of the Art Academy.	—
Ivan Nenov	Painting, sculpture and ceramics	Graduated from the Art Academy.	1925
Ilia Beshkov	Painting, illustration and caricature	Graduate of the Art Academy.	1926
Iliya Petrov	Painting	Studied at the State Academy of Arts and later became a professor at the institution.	1920s
Dechko Uzunov	Painting	Graduate; later professor and rector of the Academy.	1920s
Zlatyu Boyadzhiev	Painting	Graduated in painting from the Academy of Arts in Sofia.	1932
Stefan Kanchev	Graphic design	Studied mural painting under Dechko Uzunov.	1940–1945
Genko Genkov	Painting	Graduated in painting under Dechko Uzunov.	1948
Lyuben Zidarov	Painting and illustration	Graduated in painting from Iliya Petrov's class.	1948
Georgi Baev	Painting	Graduated from the National Academy of Art.	1949
Violeta Maslarova	Painting	Graduated in painting under Dechko Uzunov.	1950
Christo	Installation art	Studied at the Fine Arts Academy in Sofia; did not complete his studies there.	1953–1956
Mihail Simeonov	Sculpture	Graduated in monumental sculpture.	1954
Dionisii Donchev	Painting	Graduated in painting under Iliya Petrov.	1958
Svetlin Rusev	Painting	Graduate of the Art Academy; later director of the National Art Gallery.	1959
Nicola Ghiuselev	Painting and opera	Graduated in painting after six years of study.	1960
Ivan Vukadinov	Painting	Graduated in painting under Nenko Balkanski.	1961
Rumen Gasharov	Painting	Graduated from Iliya Petrov's painting class.	1962
Stefan Valev	Painting, illustration and design	Graduated in decorative-monumental painting, stained glass and mosaic under Georgi Bogdanov.	1964
Alzek Misheff	Painting and performance art	Studied painting at the Higher Institute of Fine Arts "Nikolai Pavlovich"; official sources give conflicting graduation years.	—
Keazim Isinov	Painting	Graduate of the Art Academy.	—
Atanas Yaranov	Painting	Graduate of the Art Academy.	—
Nikolay Maistorov	Painting and graphic art	Graduate of the Art Academy.	—
Lyubomir Savinov	Visual art	Graduate of the Art Academy.	—
Theodore Ushev	Animation, film and visual art	Graduate of the National Academy of Art.	1995
Krassimir Terziev	Visual art and film	Received an MA in painting.	1997
Svetlana Mircheva	Visual art and design	Studied industrial design and received an MA.	1995–2000
Yanko Tihov	Painting and printmaking	Studied fine arts and printmaking.	1997–2001
