= Alzek Misheff =

Italian artist

- Born: Alzek Misheff; October 8, 1940 (age 85); Dupnica, Kyustendil, Bulgaria
- Known for: Performer, painter and musician
- Notable work: Swimming across the Atlantic, Music From the Sky.

Alzek Misheff (Bulgarian: Алцек Мишев) (October 8, 1940) is a popular Bulgarian-Italian artist born in Dupnica, Bulgaria. Misheff graduated in 1966 with a degree in painting from the Academy of Fine Arts in Sofia. In 1971 he left Bulgaria for Italy where he currently lives and works in Milan, Italy.

Misheff is named after the Medieval Bulgar leader Alcek who led the Bulgars to Italy and settled in the area of Benevento.

== Career ==
He is well known in the international art world for the project Swimming Across The Atlantic, which was executed in the swimming pool of the ocean liner Queen Elizabeth 2 in 1982 while traveling on the route between London and New York. In the book Europa-America - The different avant-gardes produced by Franco Maria Ricci in 1976, Achille Bonito Oliva inserts Misheff between the more 30 avant-garde artists in Europe. Between his more meaningful performances Music of the sky, concert-installation of 1979 in the Public square of the Dome of Milan. Replicated in 1979 in Mills College of San Francisco and University of California Irvine (near Los Angeles).

He was invited to the Venice Biennial 2000, where he realized Proliferating Truth of Sentiment (Proliferante verità del sentimento): dived in full transparent water cylinder he has played with Lightning II (an infrared controller) and he has directed his quintet "The Swimmers". In May 2005, at the Pavilion of Contemporary Art of Milan (PAC), he directed his "Concert for Stradivari violin, pianoforte Disklavier and quartet of mobilephones-violins" with the violinist Eugene Sarbu, Paganini prize winner.

He was invited for the second time to the Venice Biennial in 2007, with Chalk portrait music of Joseph Beuys, then in sept. 16 in the same year the closing concert Harmonia mundi per Joseph Beuys with the "Orchestra italiana di flauti" (Italian flute Orchestra).

== Current projects ==
Currently he works at the Octavia Thea Studio which is located in Milan, Italy.
