= Yanko Tihov =

British-Bulgarian painter and printmaker

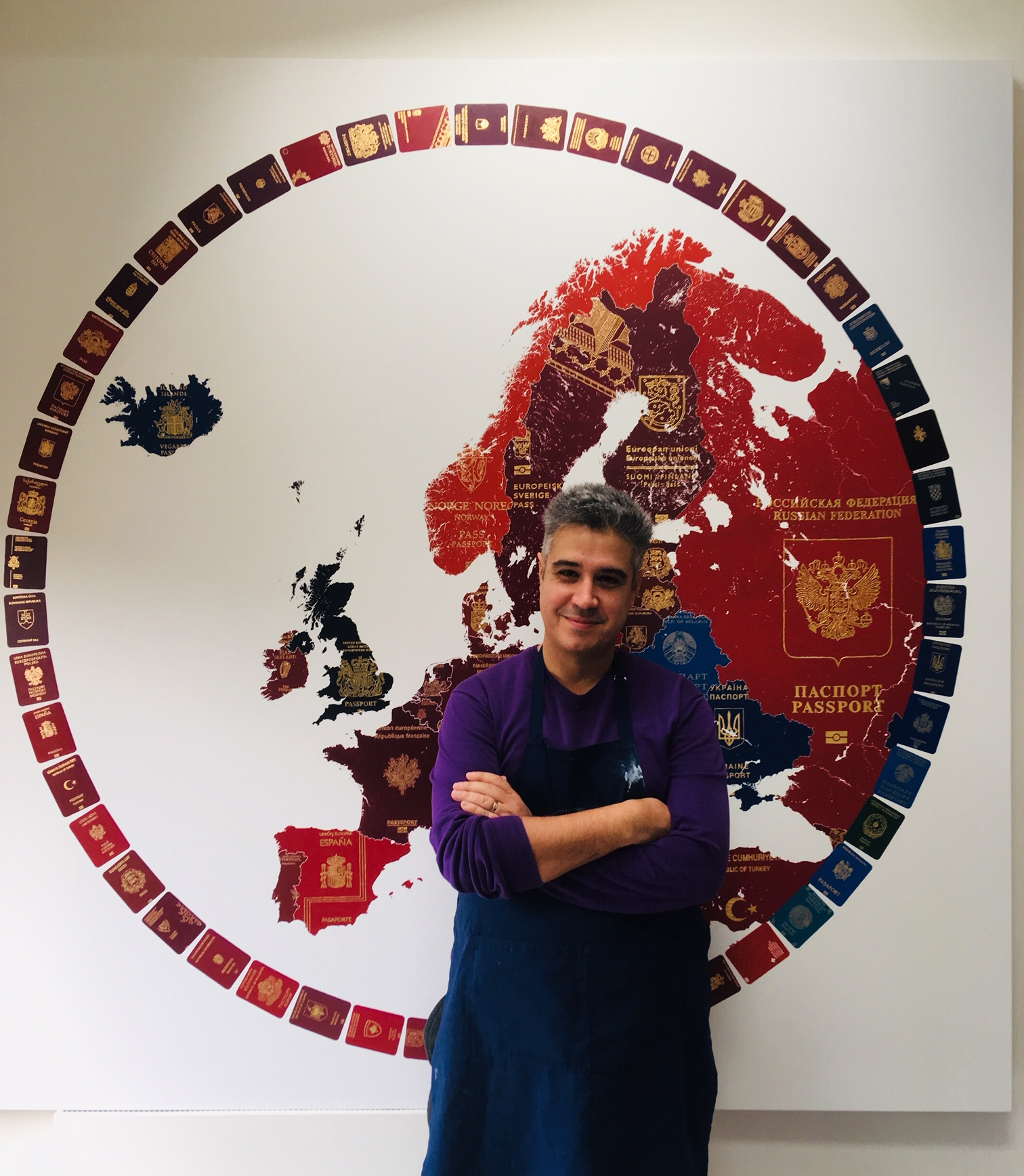
- Yanko Tihov next to his Europe Passport Map
- Born: 1977 (age 48–49); Burgas, Bulgaria
- Education: National Academy of Art, Sofia
- Occupation: Painter/printmaker
- Known for: Artist
- Website: www.yankotihov.co.uk

Yanko Tihov (Bulgarian: Янко Тихов) (born 1977, Burgas, Bulgaria) is a British and Bulgarian painter and printmaker.

== Biography ==
Yanko Tihov attended the National Academy of Art in Sofia from 1997 to 2001, before moving to London, UK.

He won prizes at Royal Institute of Oil Painters ROI (2004, 2007), Runner up of the Discerning Eye Exhibition (2008), Printmaking Ex Libris Award in Argentina (2001).

He has exhibited at The Royal Academy of Arts Summer Exhibition, Royal Institute of Oil Painters, Royal Society of Portrait Painters, Lynn Painter-Stainers Prize, Tokyo Printing Triennial, The Iowa Biennial Exhibition of Contemporary Miniature Prints and others. His work can be seen at private galleries and art fairs. Tihov's works include portraits and surreal urban images. His portrait of the Indian artist and Film Director M. F. Husain was featured in 2014 BP Portrait Award at the National Portrait Gallery in London.

Tihov lived in Notting Hill, London, before relocating to Bounds Green, Enfield in 2014.

In 2015 Tihov made ‘The London Passport Map', a digital edition hand painted with 23ct gold. The map was shown at Christie’s South Kensington, London. The London Passport Map was made from 32 different passports of the most common non-British nationalities in each London borough based on data from the 2011 census.

== Exhibitions and collections ==
- 1st Exlibris Contest Acqui Terme Rotary Club, Italy
- 3rd International Triennial Of Printmaking, Sofia, Bulgaria
- 4th International Graphic competition, Gliwice, Poland
- 11th Printmaking Biennial Varna, Bulgaria
- 21st Mini Print International, Cadaques, Spain
- 13th Exlibris small graphic exhibition Sint-Niklaas, Belgium
- Asociacion Cultural Sanmartina de Gral.S.Martin, Argentina
- 2nd Competition Biblioteca Comunale di Lomazzo, Italy
- Exlibris Ville d’issy-les- Moulineaux, France
- The Open Eye Gallery, Edinburgh, Scotland
- 14th Exlibris small graphic exhibition Sint-Niklaas, Belgium
- 5th International Graphic competition Gliwice, Poland
- Royal Society Of Portrait Painters Exhibition, London, UK
- Royal Academy Of Arts, Summer Exhibition, London, UK
- The Pastel Society, London, UK
- Royal Institute Of Oil Painters Exhibition, London, UK
- Leonardo Sciascia Prize, Venice, Rome, Florence, Milan, Italy
- 3rd Competition Biblioteca Comunale di Lomazzo, Italy
- The Iowa Biennial Exhibition of Contemporary prints, Iowa, USA
- Jill George Gallery, The Figure Show, London, UK
- ING Discerning Eye, Drawing Bursary, London, UK
- Lynn Painter-Stainers Prize, London, UK
- Lisa Sharpe Contemporary Art, One Alfred Place, London, UK
- Jack Fine Art, London, UK
- TAG Fine Arts, London, UK
