= Rose Festival, Bulgaria =

Rose Festival in Bulgaria

Rose Festival
- Type: Cultural
- Significance: Bulgarian festival of roses
- Celebrations: Parades, parties, open-air performances, rose-picking rituals
- Begins: Late May
- Ends: Mid June
- Frequency: Annual

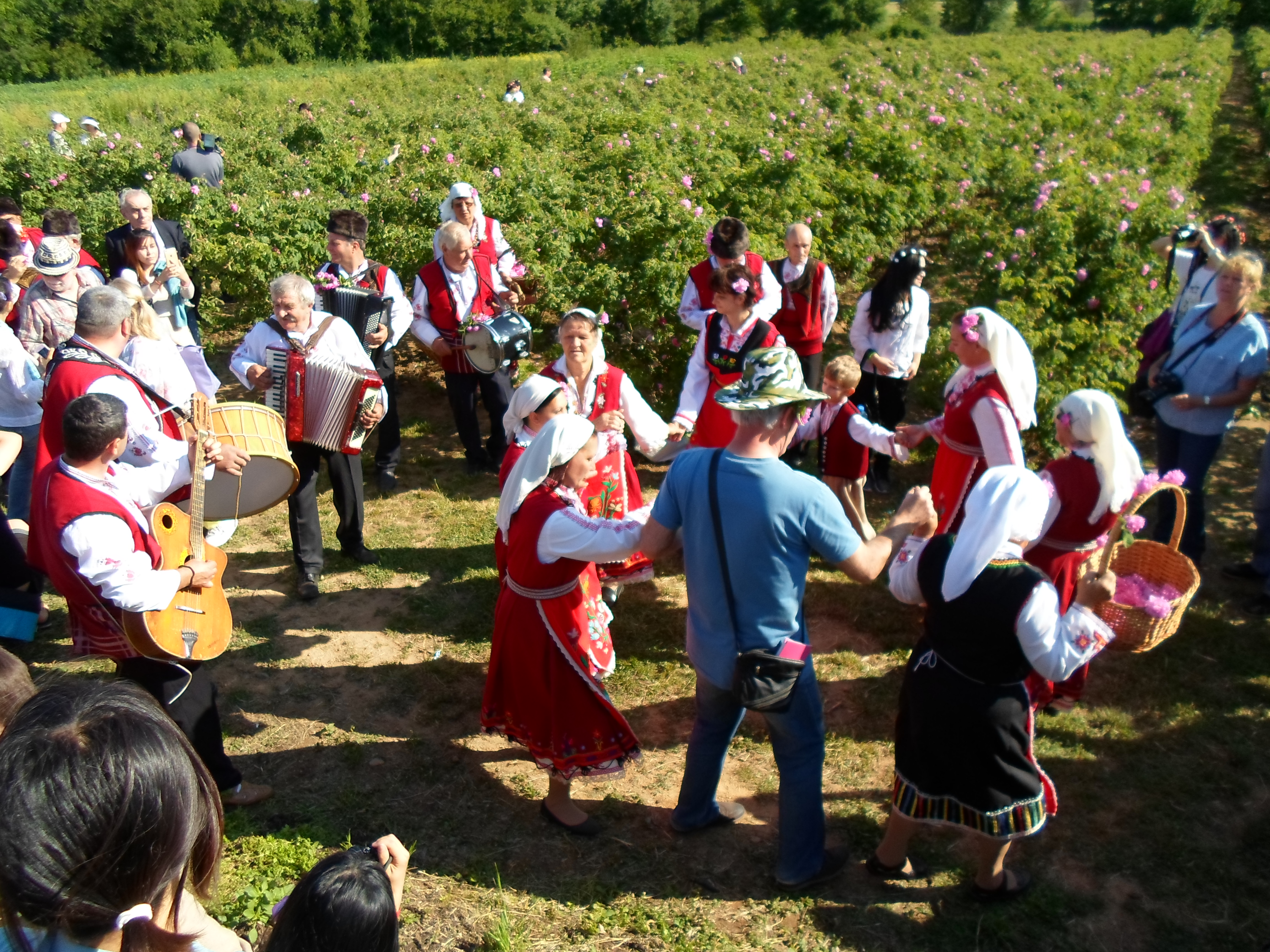
Bulgarians celebrating the Rose Festival

The Rose Festival (Bulgarian: Фестивал на розата) is an annual festival of the Bulgarian rose, taking place from late May to mid-June. Celebrations are organised in various cities in Bulgaria, including Kazanlak, Karlovo, and Gurkovo. It's also an official holiday in these cities, as well as Pavel Banya and Strelcha.

The festival program includes various rituals and events, including rose picking, the crowning of the Rose Queen, folklore performances, and traditional dances. The celebration attracts thousands of visitors who come to participate in the events, join the march, and watch the parade.

== History ==
The very first Rose Festival was organised in 1903 by the citizens of Kazanlak, celebrating beauty, flowers, and raising funds for charity.

The festival gained more popularity in 1930, with special trains arranged to encourage more visitors to attend the festival. Discounted tickets were also issued, inviting citizens from various parts of Bulgaria to visit the Rose Valley. Over the years, the festival continued to grow, gaining global popularity and attracting thousands of tourists.

== Rose-picking rituals ==
The rose-picking ritual takes place in several villages around the town of Kazanlak during the harvest season, including Yasenovo, Rozovo, and Kanchevo.

The rituals in Rozovo village start with singing and dancing in the morning. The roses are picked early in the morning, usually between 5 am and 10 am, when the roses are still moist with the morning dew. The process is very labour-intensive, requiring the petals to be carefully plucked by hand to preserve their oils.

== Crowning of the Rose Queen ==
One of the highlights of the festival is the Rose Queen Contest. Thousands flock to the street where the Rose Parade is held to witness the new queen's coronation. Music, dancing, and participants wearing traditional costumes announce the queen's arrival. The Rose Queen receives her crown from the previous year's queen, greets the guests, and invites them to pick rose petals to participate in the celebration.

The queen enters on a throne carried on a stretcher and showers the audience with pink rose petals. The ritual ends with a big dance known as the ‘Horo’, a traditional Bulgarian folk dance in which all the participants join.

== The Parade in the main square ==
The street parade and processions are also highlights of the Bulgarian Rose Festival. The final parade is over an hour long and takes place on Sunday to end the festivities. The participants include members of clubs, students, and even children dressed in colourful costumes. The newly crowned queen and the runners-up also march in the parade.

== Rose Festival in Kazanlak ==
The Rose Festival in Kazanlak is usually held in the first week of June. Thousands of locals and visitors from other villages from Bulgaria and foreign countries attend the festivities. The programme includes the selection of the Rose Queen, the harvest ritual, and a parade in the streets.

The festival in Kazanlak is the most visited in Bulgaria, but similar rituals and celebrations are also held in other cities.

=== Rose Queen Competition in Kazanlak ===
Traditionally, the Rose Festival in Kazanlak begins with the Rose Queen competition. The crowning of the Rose Queen has been a highly-anticipated event for over 50 years in Kazanlak.

High school graduates from the town compete for the crown, and the chosen girl becomes the town's emblem. The contestants are typically beautiful women selected based on their beauty, charm, and knowledge of local tradition.

== Rose Festival in Karlovo ==
Karlovo organises a Rose Festival on the last Saturday in May. The Rose Valley in Karlovo is the centre for the cultivation and production of rose oil and rose water. The oil-bearing rose is also a means of livelihood for many of the residents of the Rose Valley.

The tradition of rose picking is accompanied by various events, including traditional rituals, folklore concerts, performances, and the procession of the Rose Queen.

=== Queen of the Rose in Karlovo ===
The first Rose Queen in Karlovo was Elena Pulieva, a local girl from the town who was crowned ‘Queen of the Roses’ in 1930. The Rose Queen is still a pivotal part of the celebrations in Karlovo. After the ritualistic rose picking, dancing, and kukeri performances, the queen enters in a colourful procession.

== Rose Festival in Gurkovo ==
Another Rose Festival is held in Gurkovo, celebrating the hard work of rose growers and harvesters. The event starts with rose picking in rose fields around the Koriyata area, followed by various rituals. This includes brewing rose brandy in the town's square and tasting rose jam.

== Production of Rose Oil in Bulgaria ==
Bulgaria is one of the biggest producers of rose oil, followed by Turkey and Morocco. Bulgaria's rose production history can be traced back to the 16th century when the first rose plantations appeared in Kazanlak. The climate and soil conditions in the area are ideal for growing the damascene rose, also known as the Bulgarian rose.

The Bulgarian rose is known for its strong, fragrant qualities and has multiple uses in perfumery, food, medicine, and skincare.

It takes around 3,500 kilograms to produce just one kilogram of rose oil, and the roses bloom just once a year. Petals can only be collected during specific hours of the day, and the process requires a lot of patience and skill. This is why the price of high-quality rose oil is very expensive.

== See also ==
- Tourism in Bulgaria
- Culture of Bulgaria
