= Enchev =

Enchev, Entchev (Bulgarian: Енчев) is a Bulgarian surname, its female form is Encheva or Entcheva.

- Emilia Entcheva
- Ivan Enchev-Vidyu
- Miroslav Enchev
- Velizar Enchev

== See also ==
- Zvezdelina Entcheva Stankova
