= Folk Costume Festival =

Cultural event in Bulgaria

- Type: Cultural
- Significance: Bulgarian festival of folklore costumes
- Celebrations: Parades, parties, open-air performances
- Begins: August
- Ends: August
- Duration: 3 days
- Frequency: Annual

The Folk Costume Festival ( Bulgarian: Фестивал на народната носия в Жеравна) is an annual cultural event held in the village of Zheravna in southeastern Bulgaria. The festival celebrates Bulgaria's folk traditions, including its history of folk music, dance, costumes, and craftsmanship.

All electronic devices, including cameras and mobile phones are banned at the festival. The event takes place in the village of Zheravna, which is located in the Sliven Province.

== History ==
The Zheravna Folk Costume Festival was first organised in 2008. Hristo Dimitrov, a choreographer and producer of the National Folklore Ensemble, created the festival.

The idea came about from the positive reception he received at his wedding, where guests wore traditional Bulgarian costumes. This gave him the idea to create a similar event on a larger scale. A three-day event was created with the help of his partners, Jan and Elena Anderson, and Lachezar Germanov, the mayor of Zheravna at the time.

The event was created as a break from civilisation where everyone can join in the celebrations with traditional costumes and experience life as it was more than a century and a half ago.

=== Location and venue ===
The festival is a three-day event held in Zheravna. The location was chosen for its scenery and preserved architectural style. The town's landscape, nature, and people make it the perfect spot to showcase Bulgarian folk culture.

The festival takes place in the central square of Zheravna, which is surrounded by wooden houses, small artisan workshops, and local vendors. Since the 17th century, Zheravna has been the centre of local craft and culture.

Today, the town is an architectural and museum reserve with many historical houses, wood-carvings from the Bulgarian Revival Period, and old drinking fountains. The town is known for the signpost at the entrance, warning visitors that entering with a bad mood or without an appropriate costume is forbidden during the festival.

=== Festival rules and regulations ===
The Folklore Costume Festival has strict rules and regulations to create an authentic atmosphere of the Bulgarian revival. Visitors are expected to follow the rules and participate in the events throughout the festival.

=== Costumes and traditional attire ===
The most important rule of the Folklore Costume Festival is the traditional attire. Anyone who wishes to participate in the festival must wear a traditional folk costume. Men are also allowed to wear military uniforms. Clothing from the early 20th century is also accepted, and visitors can often purchase or rent a costume at the entrance.

=== Mobile phones and cameras ===
Mobile phones and cameras are strictly prohibited at the festival. Only accredited photographers are allowed to take photos of the event. Visitors are only allowed to use mobile phones outside the designated festival area.

=== Entrance to the festival ===
Visitors must purchase a pass, available for sale at the festival entrance. The admittance bracelet must be worn throughout the three-day event. Modern items, such as sunglasses, handbags, wristwatches, backpacks, thermoses, and any plastic products, are not allowed.

=== Music and dance performances ===
In addition to music, the event involves traditional Bulgarian folk dances, weddings, anastenaria and horo. Throughout the festival, workshops are organised where visitors can learn about traditional crafts. These include demonstrations of weaving, embroidery, pottery making, and wood carving, as well as lectures on Bulgarian folk history and costume-making techniques.

=== Culinary traditions ===
The festival provides an opportunity to savour traditional Bulgarian cuisine. Local food stalls and restaurants serve dishes such as banitsa, Bulgarian barbeque, and other traditional food served on authentic pottery cookware and cutlery. Visitors can eat on traditional Bulgarian rugs around a fire pit.

== Cultural significance ==
In addition to its cultural importance, the festival also boosts local tourism and promotes the village of Zheravna as a cultural and historical destination. The festival attracts thousands of visitors each year, including tourists from abroad who are interested in experiencing Bulgaria's folk traditions. As many as 15,000 people attend the festival every year, despite the town having only 500 hotel beds.

== See also ==
- Tourism in Bulgaria
- Culture of Bulgaria
