= Kazanlak =

Kazanlak Казанлък
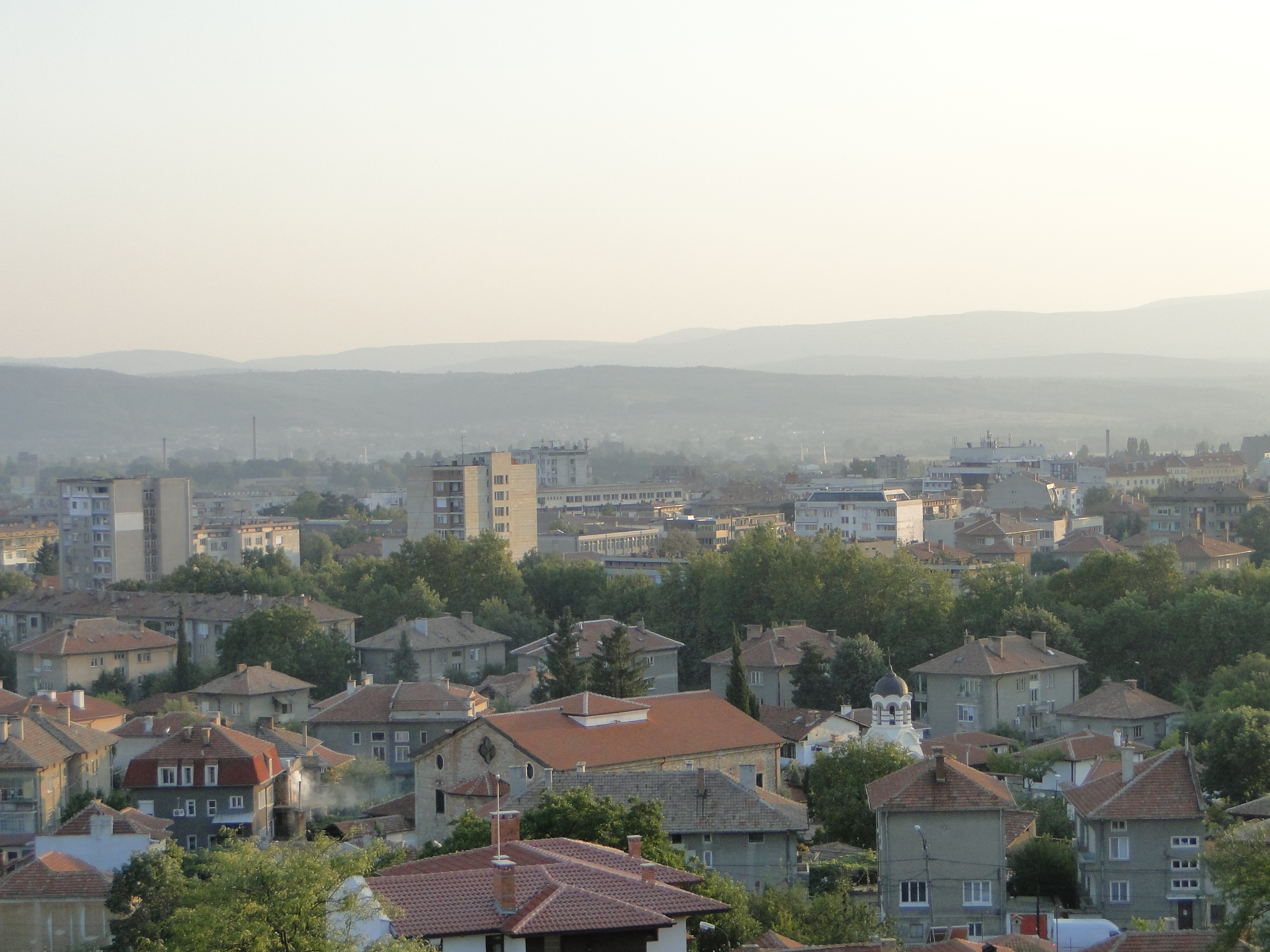
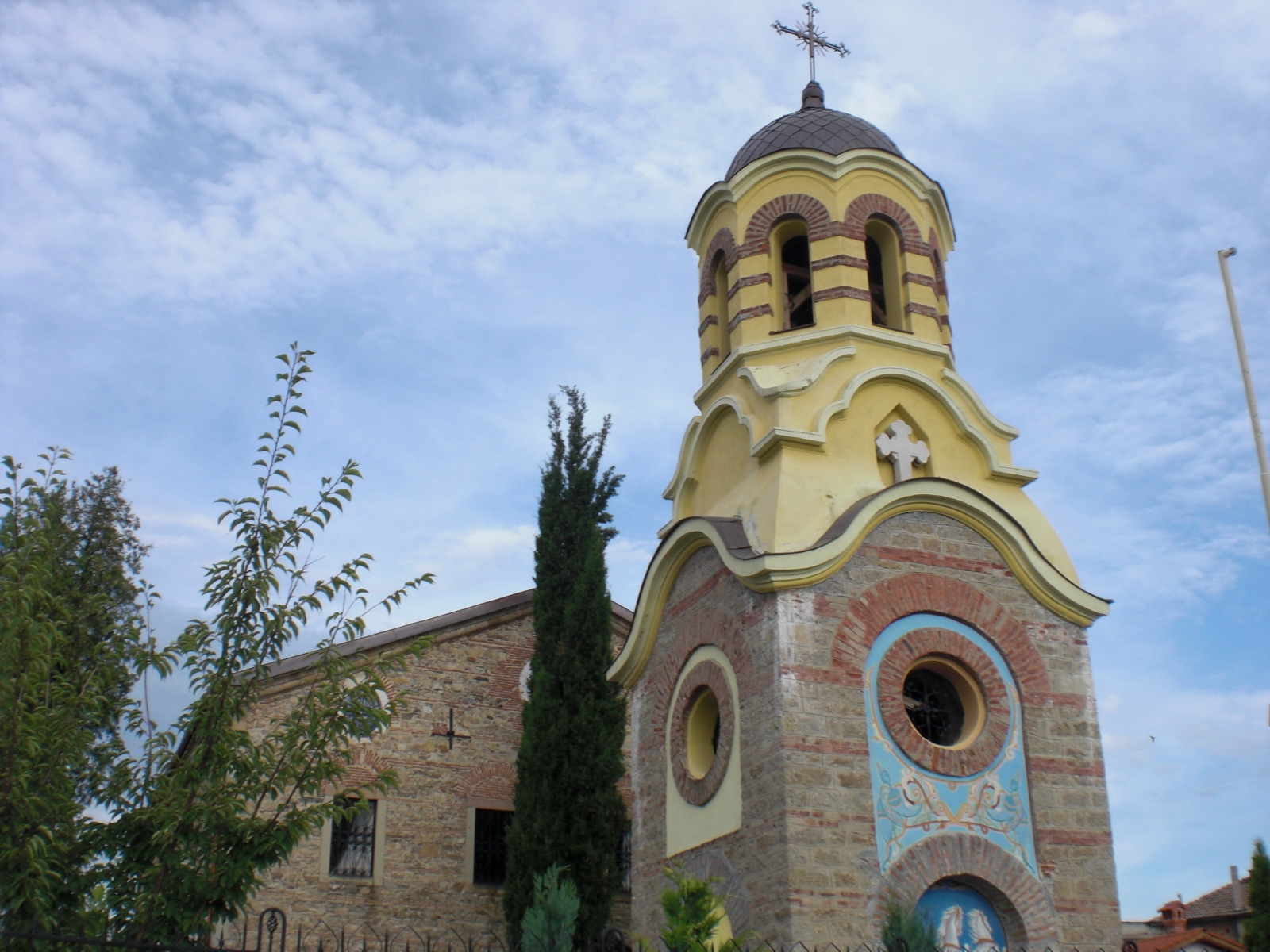
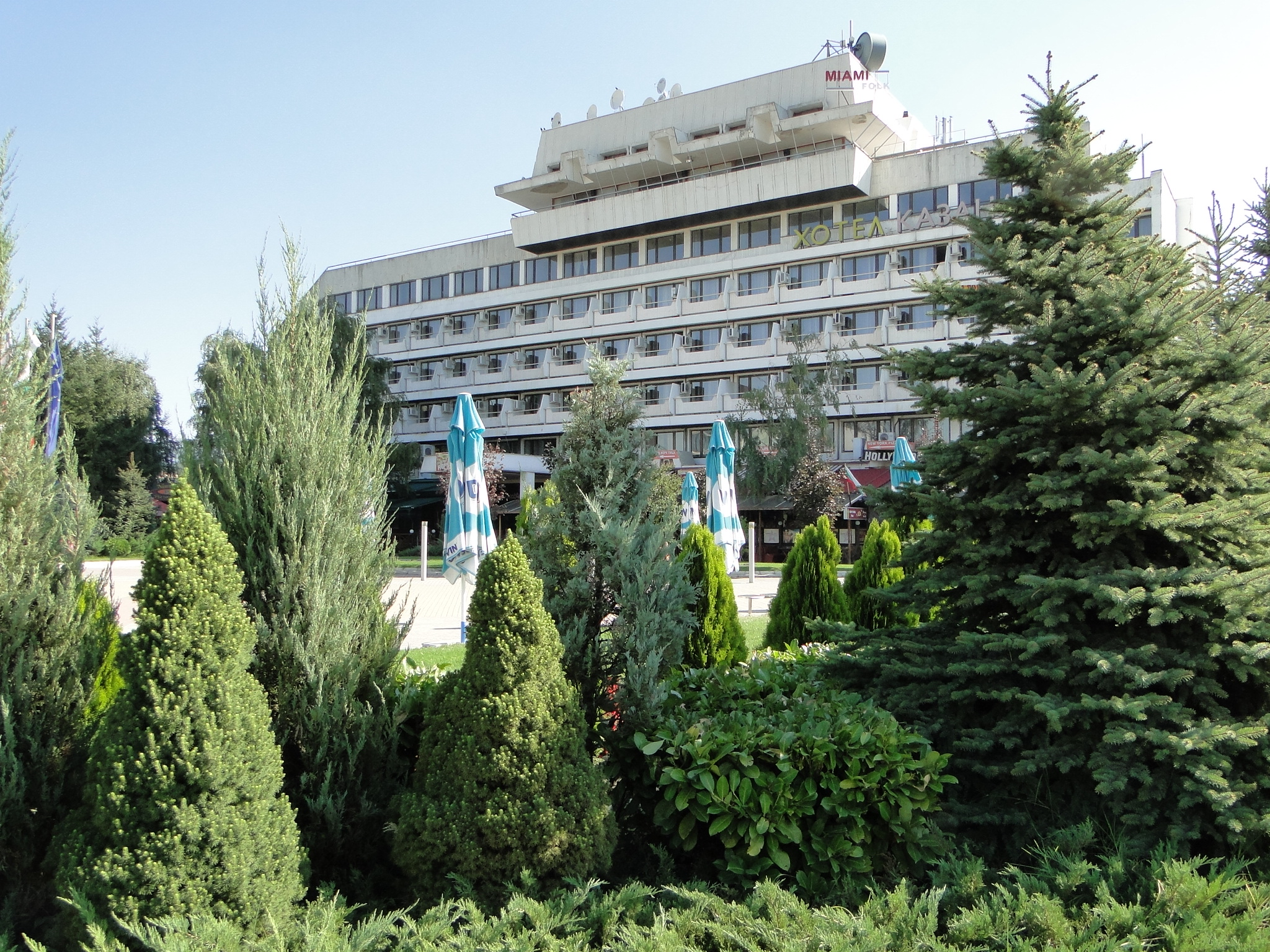
- From the top, View of Kazanlak, Saint Elijah Church, The Grand Hotel

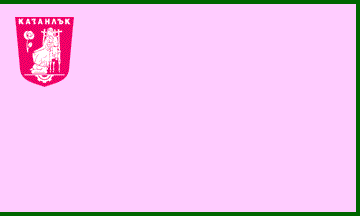
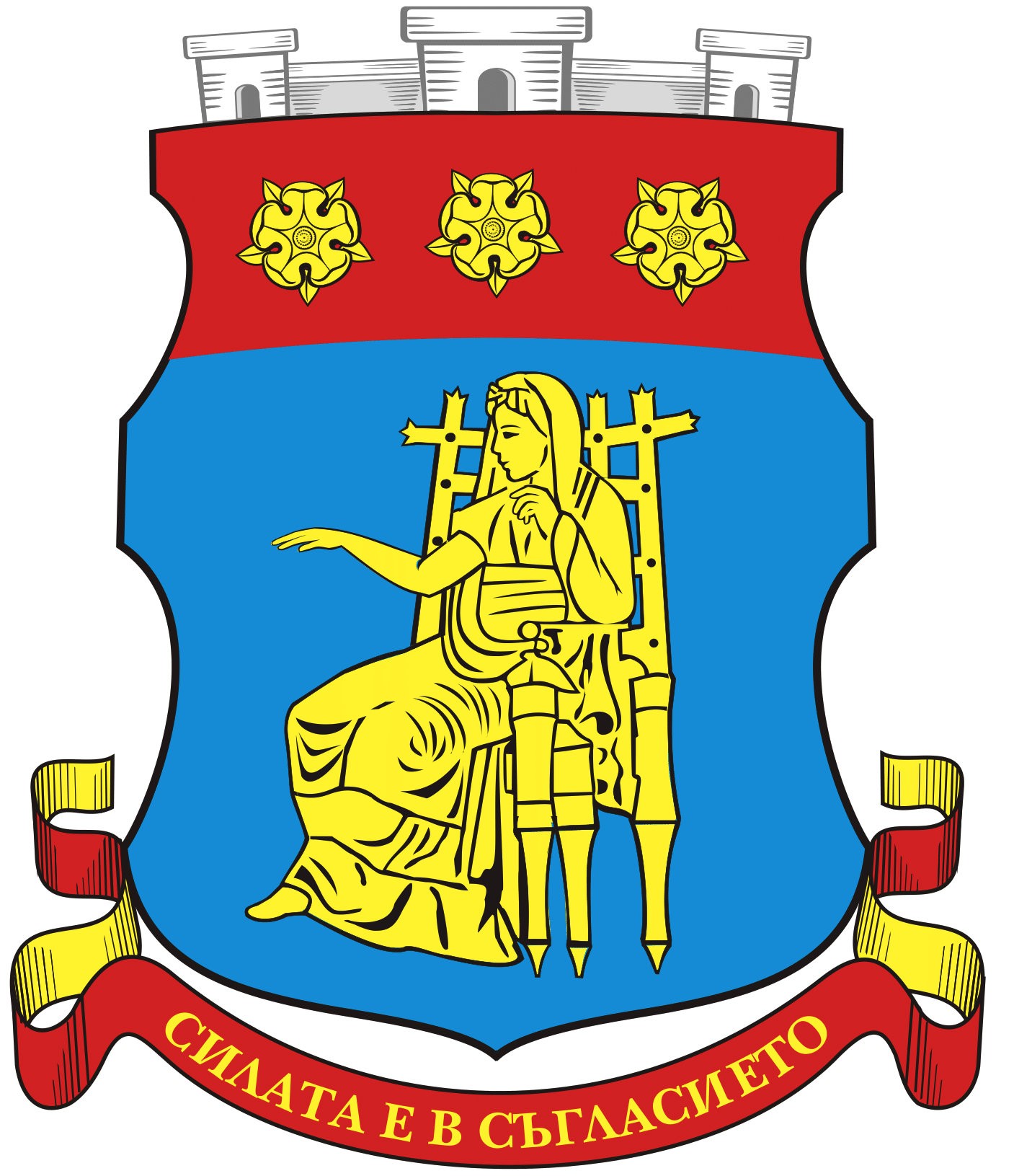
- Flag Seal
- Nickname: The Town of Roses
- Location within Bulgaria
- Coordinates: 42°37′N 25°24′E
- Country: Bulgaria
- Province: Stara Zagora

Government
  - Mayor: Galina Stoyanova

Area
  - City: 36.067 km^{2} (13.926 sq mi)
- Elevation: 407 m (1,335 ft)

Population (2025)
  - City: 45,147
  - Density: 1,251.8/km^{2} (3,242.0/sq mi)
  - Urban: 62,923
- Demonym: Kazanlakian
- Time zone: UTC/GMT +02:00 hours
- Postal code: 6100, 6102, 6103
- Area code: 0431
- Website: Official website; Visit Kazanlak

Kazanlak (Bulgarian: Казанлък [kɐzɐnˈɫɤk] is a town in Stara Zagora Province, Bulgaria. It is located in the middle of the Kazanlak Valley, at the foot of the Balkan Mountains, which forms the eastern part of the Rose Valley. It is the administrative centre of the homonymous Kazanlak Municipality. The ancient Thracian city of Seuthopolis was situated near the town.

The town is among the 15 biggest industrial centres in Bulgaria, with a population of 45,147 people as of Dec 2025.

It is the center of rose oil extraction in Bulgaria and the oil-producing rose of Kazanlak is one of the most widely recognizable national symbols.

== History ==
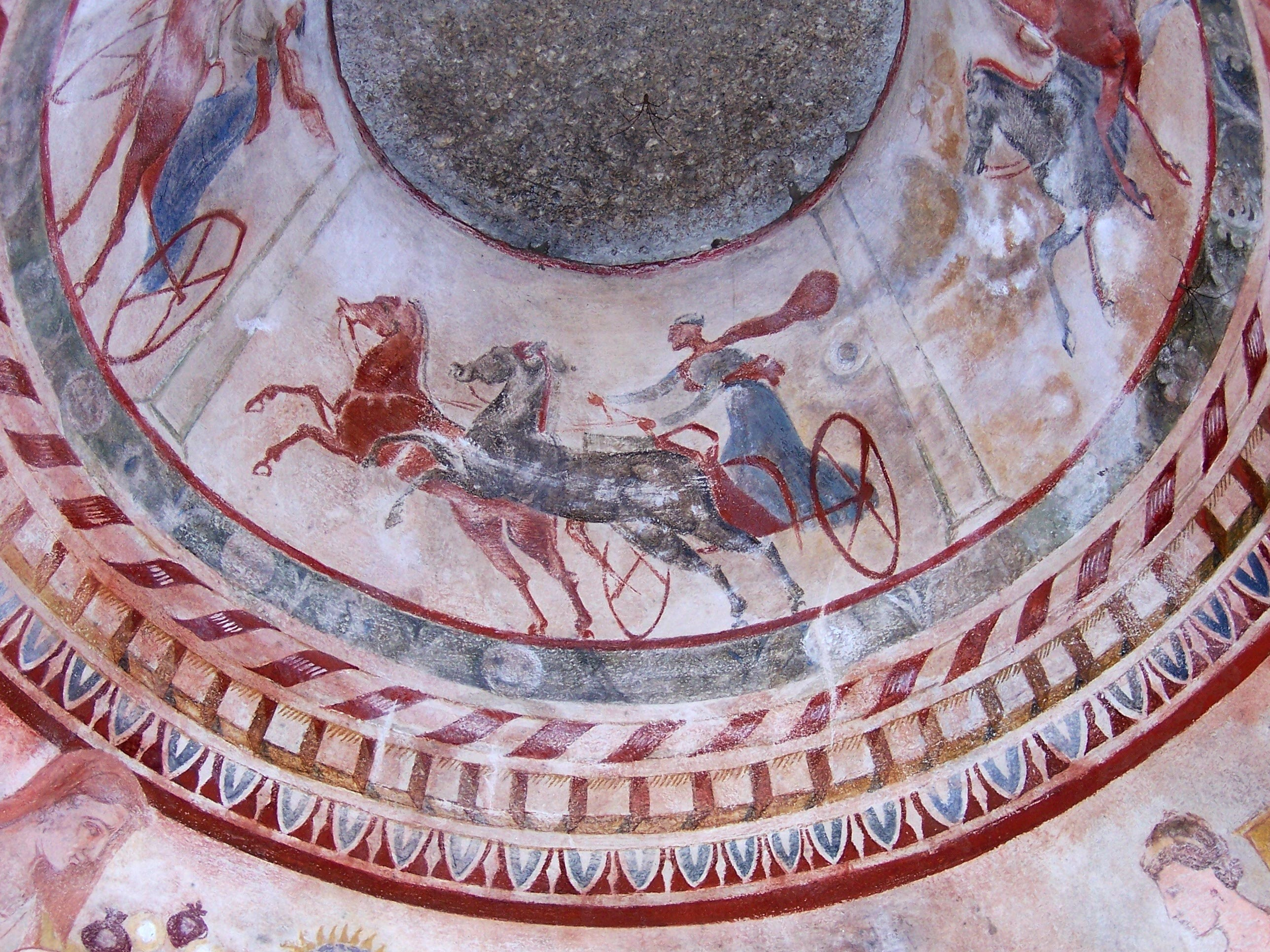
Fresco in the 4th century BCE Thracian Tomb of Kazanlak, an UNESCO World Heritage Site.

The oldest settlement in the area of the modern-day city dates back to the Neolithic era (6th-5th millennium BCE). During the 4th-3rd centuries BCE the lands on the upper Tundzha river were within the dominion of the Thracian ruler Seuthes III and took an important place in the historical development of Thrace during the Hellenistic era. The Thracian city of Seuthopolis (Σευθόπολις) was uncovered near Kazanlak and thoroughly studied at the time of the construction of the Koprinka Reservoir. In the 4th century BCE, near the ancient Thracian capital of Seuthopolis and close to the city, a magnificent Thracian tomb was built. Consisting of a vaulted brickwork "beehive" (tholos) tomb, it contains, among other things, painted murals representing a Thracian couple at a ritual funeral feast. The tomb was declared a UNESCO World Heritage Site in 1979.

In the Middle Ages the valley became an administrative center of the Krun region where the Bulgarian boyar Aldimir (Eltimir) ruled. After 1370 Kazanlak was under Ottoman dominion in the aftermath of the Bulgarian–Ottoman wars. Its modern name is derived from the Turkish Kazanlık.

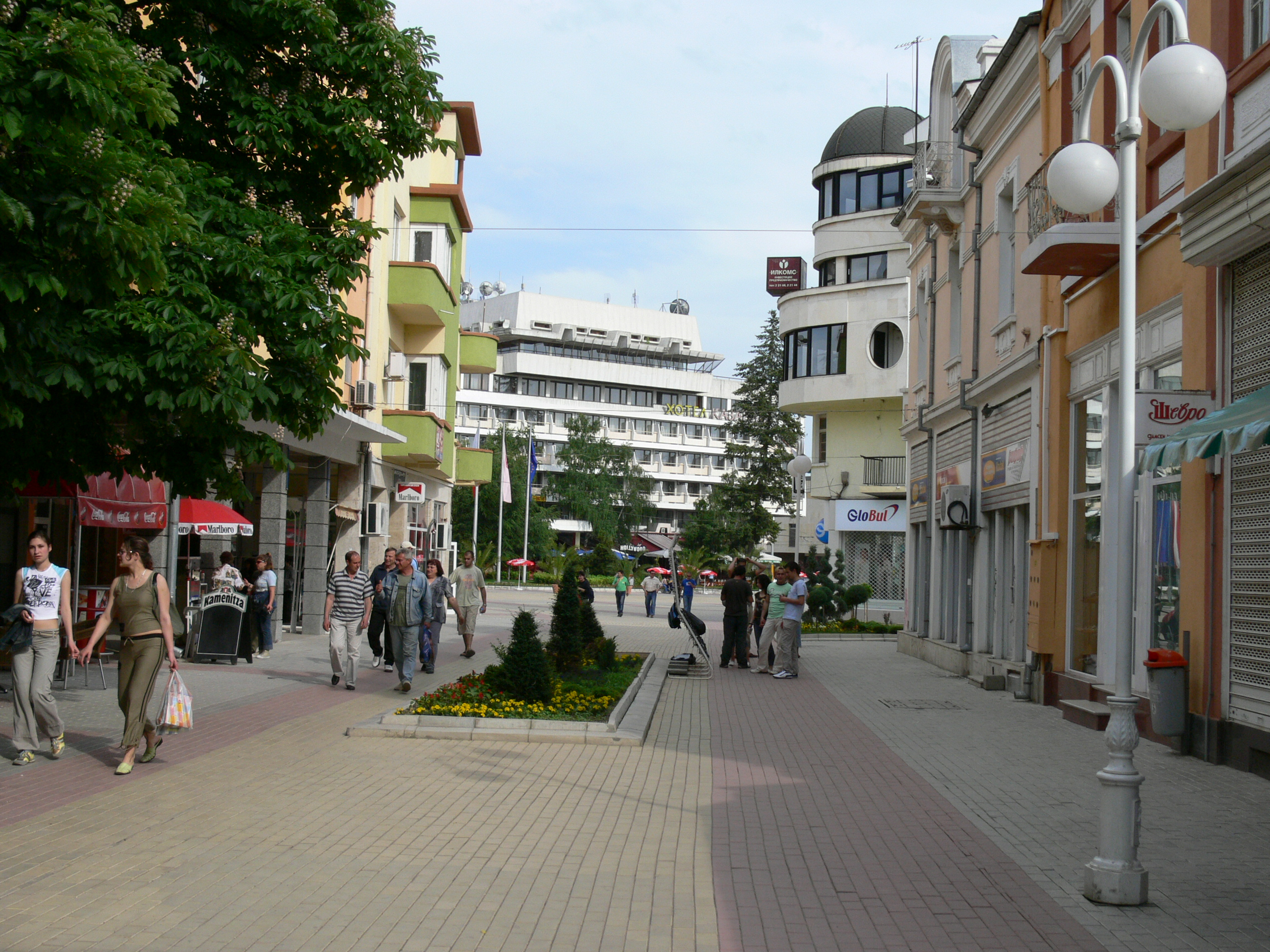
The pedestrianized centre of modern Kazanlak off Seuthopolis Square.

The modern city dates back to the beginning of the 15th century. It was founded as a military fortress to protect the Shipka Pass and later developed as a city of craftsmen. More than 50 handcrafts developed such as tanning, coppersmithing, goldsmithing, frieze weaving, shoemaking, cooperage and, of course, rose cultivation. The oil-producing rose, imported from central Asia via Persia, Syria and Turkey, found all the necessary conditions to thrive – proper temperature, high moisture and light, sandy, cinnamon-forest soils. Kazanlak rose oil has won gold medals at expositions in Paris, London, Philadelphia, Antwerp, Laet, and Milan. After Bulgarian independence the handcrafts declined due to the loss of the markets in the huge Ottoman Empire. The textile, aerospace and military industries were developed.

== Geography ==
=== Climate ===
The climate is temperate, with average temperatures from 0 °C (32 °F) to 1.5 °C (34.7 °F) in January and 21 °C (70 °F) in July. The average altitude is 350 m (1,150 ft).

Spring temperatures rise comparatively early and are usually above 5 °C (41 °F) (in the first half of March) and above 10 °C (50 °F) (in the first half of April), but sometimes there are cold spring periods. Summer temperatures are moderate, and the average summer rainfall is rather high, especially at the beginning of the season. During the second half of summer and the beginning of autumn, rainfall drops. Average temperatures throughout October are above 10 °C (50 °F) and remain above 5 °C (41 °F) until mid-November. The winter is mild, with comparatively low snowfall, short-lasting snow-cover, and moderate minimum temperatures. The most precipitation falls in June, while the lowest is in February and March. A typical wind direction is from north-east.

=== Relief ===
The town of Kazanlak and the surrounding region is situated in the western part of the Kazanlak Valley. There are various soil types, mostly maroon soils (about 50%) which are very suitable for growing oleaginous (oil-producing) cultures and herbs.

The Kazanlak Valley was formed during the Quaternary Period with the rise of the Balkan and Sredna Gora mountain ranges and the submergence of the Fore-Balkan fields. The fault character of the valley is evidenced by the hot mineral springs near the villages of Ovoshtnik and Yagoda, as well as the town of Pavel Banya.

Morphologically, the Kazanlak Valley is divided into three areas. The western area is the broadest one and has a lot of hills due to the numerous alluvials formed by the rivers flowing through the Balkan Mountains. Although the average altitude is 350 m (1,150 ft), here it reaches up to 500 m (1,600 ft). The central area is narrower and lower, and the relief of the eastern area is much more complex.

=== Soils and mineral resources ===
Soil cover is closely related to the relief, climate, flora of the region and the economical activity of the man. The varied Bulgarian natural environment has produced about 20 soil types and subtypes.

This region is characterised mainly by cinnamon-forest soil. The spreading of the accumulative river materials along the Tundzha river and the Eninska river has formed alluvial soil types and subtypes. The draining and the deeply intended geological base together with the drought-resistant and thermophilic forest vegetation (oak, field elm, hornbeam) are the reason for the spreading of the forest soils.

The arable lands related to this soil type are inclined and that leads to the degradable effect of the plane, linear and ravine erosion. The alluvial soils are high-productive – they are represented by arable lands of I, II and III category. They cover two-thirds of the searched territory and this is an obstruction to the town growth.

The lands are planted mainly with roses and perennial plants. Low-productive and degraded lands are located only north-east of Kazanlak. Part of them are covered with meadows and pastures. This region is not rich in mineral resources of industrial importance but there are several non-metalliferous minerals of local importance. There is a clay deposit for brick manufacturing in Manastirska Niva locality two km west of Kazanlak. A greisen-pit for broken stone, paving stones, and kerbs is located 7 km (4.3 mi) east of the town in Kara Dere locality.

Sand, gravel, and felt are extracted from the pits near the villages of Ovoshtnik and Cherganovo. There are granite pits near the villages of Kanchevo and Bouzovgrad. The granite is used for kerbs, paving stones, and others.

=== Water resources ===
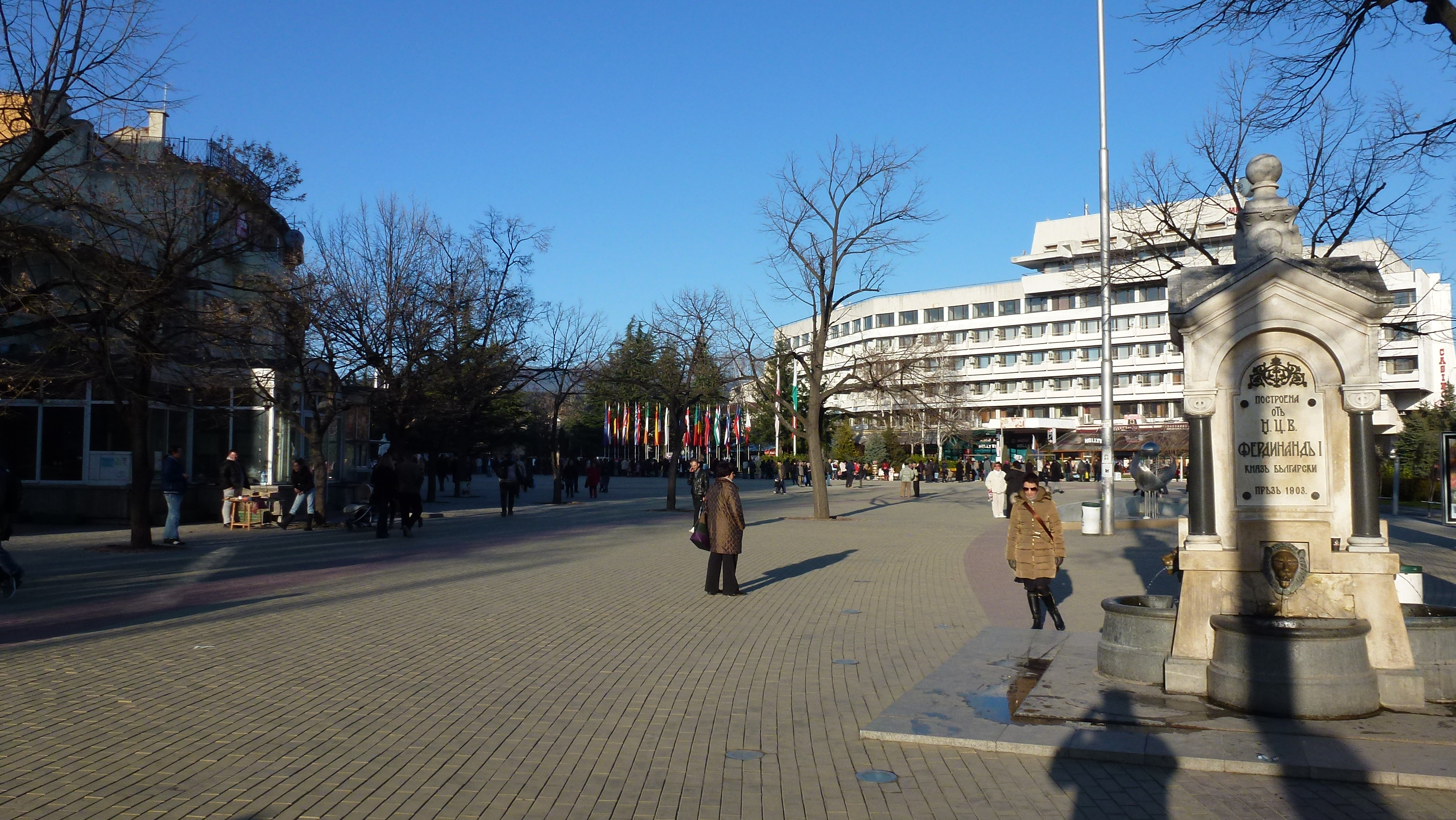
Luvova Cheshma, or Lion's Fountain, founded in 1903, in Seuthopolis Square.

The Kazanlak valley is drained by the Tundzha river and its tributaries. The Tundzha takes its source in the highest part of the Balkan east of Mount Botev, flows across several valleys and plains – Kazanlak Valley, Sliven Valley, Yambol Field and Elhovo FIeld and empties into the Maritsa river. The total length of its Bulgarian section is 349.5 km (217.2 mi), and its drainage basin area is 7,834 km^{2} (3,025 sq mi). The river flows slowly in Kazanlak valley near the north slopes of Sredna Gora mountain. The average annual water quantity increases southwards.

At Koprinka Reservoir it is 9.5 cubic metres (2,100 imp gal) per second on average or about 300,000,000 cubic metres (6.6×10^{10} imp gal) per year; at the village of Knezha it is 31.14 cubic metres (6,850 imp gal) per second or 1,200,000,000 cubic metres (2.6×10^{11} imp gal) per year. But this water quantity is not equally distributed during the whole year. The maximum is in spring (April and May) due to the intensive snow melting and high rainfalls in spring. The underground waters of the considerable in range and flow rate alluvial cones play an important role in the drain regulation during summer season when the rainfall is minimum. Southwest of the village of Koprinka the river valley is deeply cut in the slope of Sredna Gora mountain and this narrowness was used for the Koprinka dam construction which permits the irrigation of the land round Kazanlak and Stara Zagora. Many tributaries feed the Tundzha river; those rising in the Balkan mountains are numerous and deeper.

The rivers Tazha, Leshnitsa, Eninska and Maglizhka and their deeply cut in the Balkan slopes valleys are of remarkable beauty. The Kran river rises in the village of Kran and collecting several spring flows through the western part of the town and gradually disappears in the terrace materials of the Tundzha river.

The Eninska river rises in the Balkan, collects the waters of many springs, flows through the eastern part of Kazanlak and empties into the Tundzha river south of the town. Both tributaries have deeply cut valleys in their upper courses. In the lower courses the terrain is not so inclined and the river beds are wider. The average annual water quantity of the Eninska river at the village of Enina is 0.75 cubic metres (160 imp gal) per second. The maximum water flow is in April and May, at 1.70 cubic metres (370 imp gal) and 1.49 cubic metres (330 imp gal) per second, respectively. The minimum is in September at 0.20 cubic metres (7.1 cu ft) per second. These tributaries (especially the Eninska river) are characterised by plenty of alluvial formations.

Many gullies run down the slopes of Tulbeto hill (located in the north-eastern part of the town) when heavy rain falls or snow melts and carry to the Eninska river heavy alluvial formations. Two or three km north of Kazanlak the rivers Eninska and Kranska are connected by a drain carrying off the water directed towards the town. South of the town there is another drain system carrying the disappearing in the alluvial cone waters from the rivers Eninska and Kranska towards the Tundzha river.

== Population ==
During the first decade after the liberation of Bulgaria, in the 1880s the population of Kazanlak numbered about 9,000. Since then it started growing decade by decade, mostly because of the migrants from the rural areas and the surrounding smaller towns, reaching its peak in 1985 exceeding 60,000. After this time, the population has started decreasing rapidly in consequence of the poor economic situation in the Bulgarian provinces during the 1990s that led to a new migration in the direction of the country capital Sofia and abroad.

Historical population
Year	Pop.	±%
1887	9,180	—
1910	10,568	+15.1%
1934	14,843	+40.5%
1946	20,096	+35.4%
1956	30,934	+53.9%
1965	44,384	+43.5%
1975	53,593	+20.7%
1985	61,052	+13.9%
1992	60,095	−1.6%
2001	53,770	−10.5%
2011	47,325	−12.0%
2021	42,208	−10.8%
Source: Censuses

=== Ethnic groups ===
Ethnic group	2011	
Ethnic group	Number	%
Bulgarians	40,360	85,28%
Roma	2,073	4,38%
Turks	1,462	3,09%
Others	311	0,66%
Undeclared	207	0,44%
No known	2,912	6,15%
Total	47,325	

== Culture ==
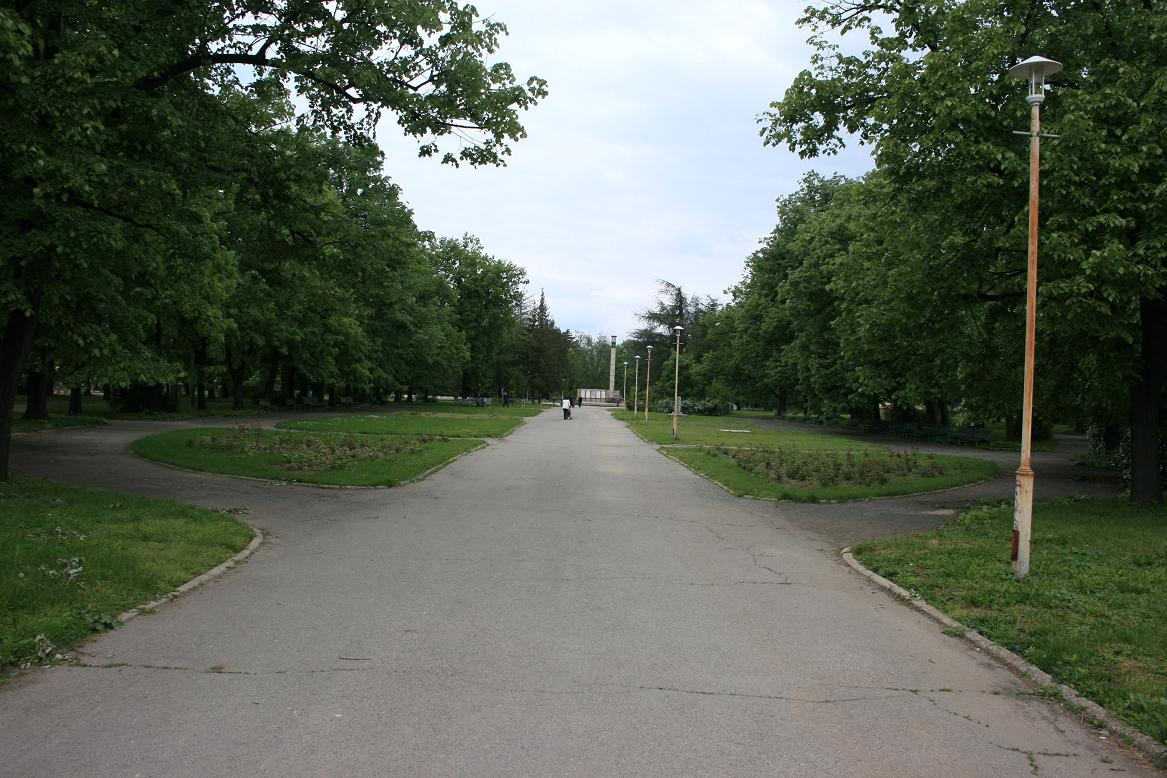
Rosarium Park.

Kazanlak has a long, solid tradition in the area of culture and enlightenment. At the every beginning of the Revival, the populace of Kazanlak was already opening school and cultural reading centers – including the Pedagogical school of Kazanlak, which prepared teachers for the entire country. For many well-known Bulgarian artists and performers, this was the place where their physical and creative lives began. The cultural centre of Kazanlak is the Iskra chitalishte, founded in 1860. It contains a library, theatre, cinema, and museum. It was host to the first Bulgarian opera, Siromahkinya.

- Iskra Library – one of the oldest libraries in Bulgaria, founded in 1860, now holds over 500 volumes.
- Rosarium Park with many spots for recreation.
- The House – museums of famous Bulgarian artists Dechko Uzunov and Nenko Balkanski.
- The Thracian tombs. The remains discovered from the ancient Thracian culture – objects, jewelry, and vessels of gold, silver, bronze and clay – have long since become part of the world historical legacy.

=== Iskra Town History Museum ===
The Iskra Town History Museum is one of the first provincial town museums in Bulgaria. It was founded on 29 June 1901, by Peter Topuzov – a bright man of enterprise from Kazanlak and by decision of the leaders of Iskra Studious Club. More than 50 000 exhibits revealing the history of Kazanlak area from ancient times until nowadays have been kept at Iskra museum. The finds from Thracian town of Seuthopolis are displayed in three separate halls. Temporary exhibitions with valuable articles from this museum and loan-collections are arranged during the active tourist season.

=== Rose Museum ===
The museum is a part of the Historical Museum "Iskra" in Kazanlak. In 1967 a small exposition was created, which was dedicated to rose-picking in Kazanlak and the region. In 1969 the exposition grew into an independent museum. Nowadays the Rose Museum stores more than 15 000 exponents related to rose-picking and rose-production in Bulgaria. The museum exposition includes original pictures and documents of the development of rose production, instruments for processing of the rose gardens, vessels for storing and exporting rose oil and rose water. Restorations of a rose warehouse and the first laboratory for examination of rose oil created in 1912 are made in the museum. One of the biggest attractions in the museum is a rose oil vessel which had been used for the last time in 1947 to this day a strong rose scent can still be smelled around it.

=== Koulata Ethnographic Complex ===
Mirska Street is a cobbled street in the Koulata District, the oldest part of Kazanlak, located near the Thracian Tomb of Kazanlak. It features traditional architecture from the Bulgarian National Revival period (18th–19th centuries). These buildings form the Koulata Ethnographic Complex, which was restored and has been open to visitors since 1976, showcasing the historical material culture of the Kazanlak region.

Before stepping through the gate, visitors can hear the coppersmiths’ hammers. They tell the stories of the typical local coppersmiths’ craft. Opposite are the violin-makers and next door is the goldsmith's. The country house nestles among bushes and trees. It is one-storied and asymmetrical. It has the characteristic of the Balkan valley houses from the end of the 18th and the beginning of the 19th century.

The lifestyle of the late 19th and early 20th century inhabitants of the region is shown in the restored houses from the time of the Bulgarian Renaissance. The artefacts displayed here are kept in the Ethnography department. Kazanlak was a famous crafts town in the near past. Visitors can try some of the rose industry products – jam, liqueur, and gyulovitsa (rose brandy).

=== Buzludzha National Park ===
Buzludzha National Park rises east of the Shipka pass. It is a very important part of Bulgarian history – here, on 30 July 1868, Hadzhi Dimitar fell in battle. He was at the head of a small group of rebels fighting the numerous Turkish enemy. In 1961 a monument was built here to commemorate this act of heroism. The impressive marble figure of Hadji Dimiter is outlined against the green background of the pine-trees. Near it, under the venerable beeches, a stone bas relief commemorates another event in Bulgarian history – founding of the Bulgarian Workers' Social Democratic Party on 2 August 1891, after a clandestine congress. Buzludzha with its numerous chalets, rest homes and hotels offers excellent opportunities for the lovers of winter sports and tourism.

=== Shipka National Park ===
Shipka National Park is founded on the same area where the bloody battles of the Russian-Turkish Liberation War occurred during the 1870s. It represents a complex of memorial tablets, monuments, trenches, and bunkers reminiscent of the battle.

On the top of the mount at Shipka rises the "Freedom Monument". It was paid for by voluntary donations of the Bulgarian people and built after the design of Atanas Donkov, an architect, and Alexander Andreev, a sculptor. The monument was opened officially in 1934. The monument's expositions relate the story of Russian soldiers' and Bulgarian volunteers' heroism during the five-month defence of the pass. From the last ground there is a panorama of the restored details of the battle field, monuments and common graves reminiscent of the self-sacrifice of the Russian and Bulgarian heroes.

The locality offers excellent conditions for relaxation and tourism. Several shops, cafes with well-stocked wet-bars, camping, a comfortable hotel-restaurant, and a petrol station.

The national Shipka-Buzludza park-museum includes Shipka Memorial Church (or Church of the Nativity) near the town of Shipka, Shipka National Park, Freedom Monument near the village of Sheinovo, and Buzludza National Park.

=== The Shipka Memorial Church ===
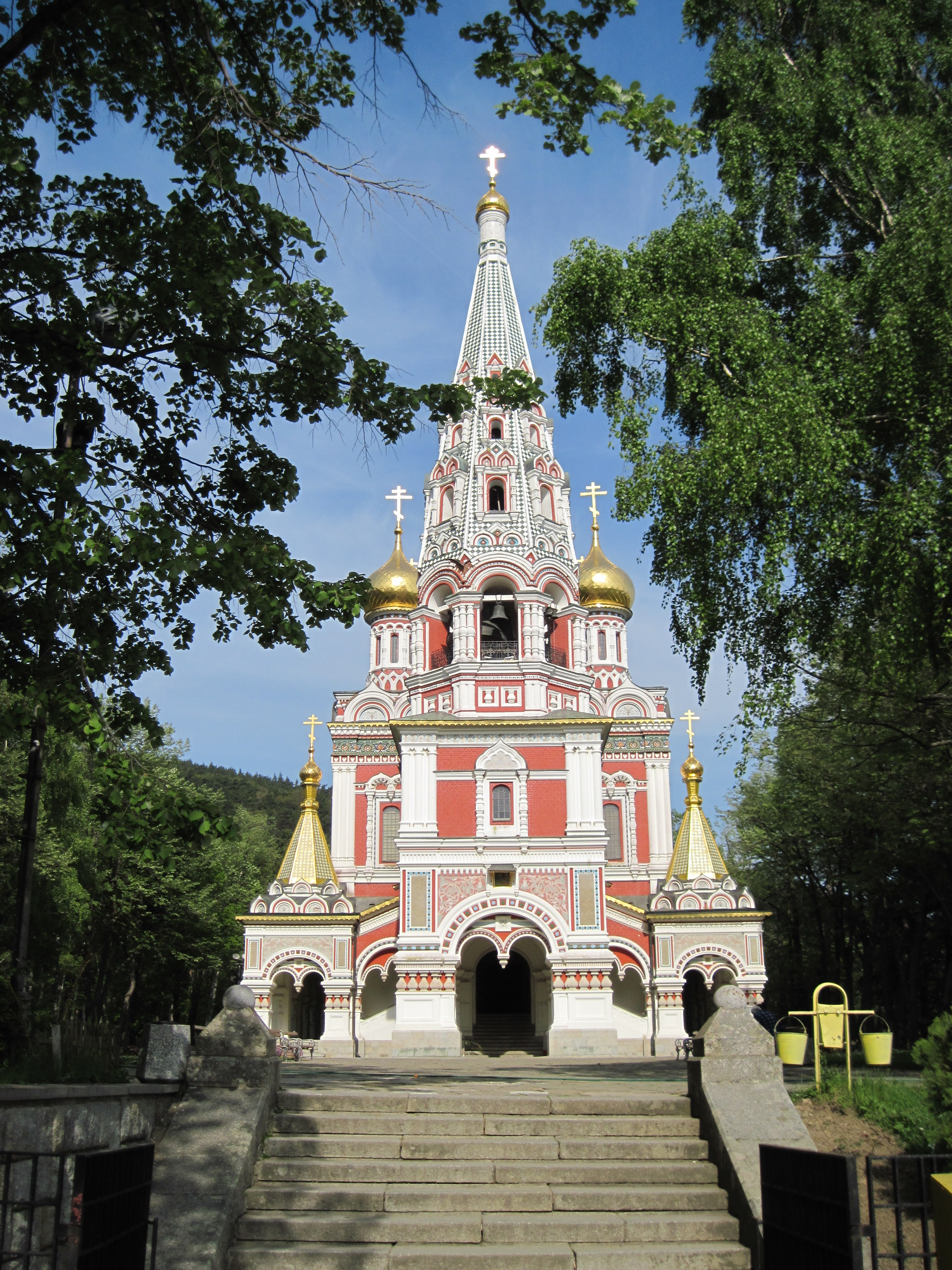
The Russian-style Shipka Memorial Church.

The Shipka Memorial Church is 12 km (7.5 mi) north of Kazanlak, at the south foot of the Stara Planina mountains near the town of Shipka. It was erected after Bulgarian independence as a monument to Russian and Bulgarian dead. The golden domes and the green and pink façade loom against the mountains and attract the attention of the travelers in the Shipka pass.

The project design following 17th century Russian church architecture with arks, friezes, pediments, and gold-plated ornaments, was the work of the Czech architect A.I. Tomisko. The main entrance has three arks, topped off with the distinctive 50-metre (160 ft) high spire of the bell tower. There are 17 bells; the heaviest of them weighs about 12 metric tons (12 long tons; 13 short tons). The lime-tree iconostasis is richly decorated with gilded wood-carvings and is of great artistic value.

The icons were presented by Russian monks from the monastery of St. Pantaleimon on Mount Athos, Greece. The names of the Russian regiments and of Russian and Bulgarian dead are inscribed on 34 marble plates built in the walls of the church. The honoured dust of the Russian soldiers killed at Shipka Pass (1877–78) have been kept in 17 stone sarcophagi in the crypt. The Shipka Memorial church was ceremoniously consecrated on 27 September 1902.

=== Thracian Tomb of Kazanlak ===
The tomb is part of a large Thracian necropolis. It comprises a narrow corridor and a round burial chamber, both decorated with murals representing a Thracian couple at a ritual funeral feast. The monument dates back to the 4th century BCE and has been on the UNESCO protected World Heritage Site list since 1979. The murals are memorable for the splendid horses and for a gesture of farewell, in which the seated couple grasp each other's wrists in a moment of tenderness and equality (according to Lyudmila Zhivkova—a view that is not shared by all specialists). The paintings are Bulgaria's best-preserved artistic masterpieces from the Hellenistic period.

The tomb is situated near the ancient Thracian capital of Seuthopolis in a region where more than a thousand tombs of kings and members of the Thracian aristocracy can be found.

The seated woman of the murals is depicted on the reverse of the Bulgarian 50 stotinki coin issued in 2005.

=== The Kosmatka Tomb ===
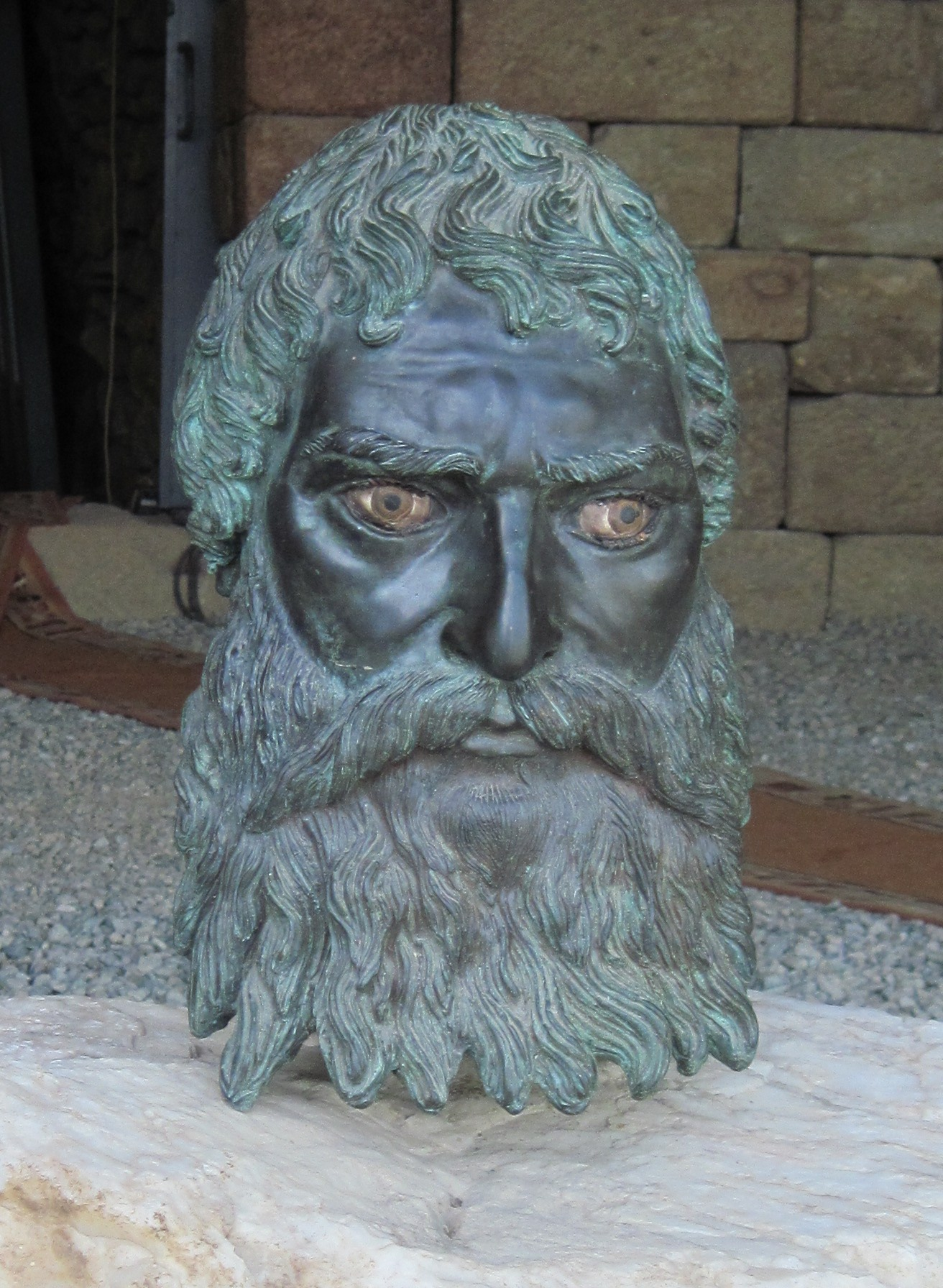
Reproduction of a portrait bust of Seuthes III from the Kosmatka tomb.

One of the most impressive monuments of the Thracian civilization in the Valley of the Thracian Kings, is the heroon (a temple-tomb of a hero of royal status) of Seuthes III. In the summer of 2004 a team of Bulgarian archaeologists unearthed a large, intact Thracian mausoleum dating back from the 5th century BCE near the Bulgarian town of Shipka, Kazanlak municipality. The temple was buried under the 20-metre (66 ft) high "Golyamata Kosmatka" mound. "This is probably the richest tomb of a Thracian king ever discovered in Bulgaria. Its style and its making are entirely new to us as experts," said Georgi Kitov, the head of the team.

The Kosmatka Tomb represents a remarkable Thracian heroon built accordingly to the Orphic traditions of the end of the 5th or beginning of the 4th century BCE. Serving also as a symbolic tomb of Seuthes III, it contained an enormous treasure, exhibited now in the Iskra Museum and Art Gallery. More than 70 silver, gold and bronze objects, which were used as ritual offering to the gods, were discovered during the excavations.

The temple was used between the end of the 5th and the beginning of the 3rd century BCE, when a symbolic burial ceremony of Seuthes III took place, the famous founder of the Thracian city of Seuthopolis, located only 10 km (6.2 mi) away. After the symbolic burial ceremony, the temple was closed and the entrance sealed and buried.

=== Literary and Art Museum of "Chudomir" ===
Among the town's more interesting attractions is the house of the acclaimed Bulgarian writer, artist, and activist Dimitar Chorbadzhiiski, whose pen name was Chudomir (1890–1967). The house was declared a museum the year after his death, in 1968, and now has the status of a national historical cultural landmark, as confirmed by Protocol 15 of the State Records for 3 December 1968. The museum complex, remodeled and reopened in 1979, now includes the artist's house and an art exhibition and related documents housed in three halls, covering an area of 300 square meters. Here there are more than 15,000 original manuscripts, paintings, sketches, letters, books, and personal effects that belonged to Chudomir and his wife, the artist Mara Chorbadzhiiska. This is the only museum in Bulgaria dedicated to both literature and art, and it is also the headquarters of the respected Chudomir Cultural Foundation. The museum is also one of the 100 Tourist Sites of Bulgaria.

== Economy ==
The following sectors dominate the economy of Kazanlak Municipality:

► Industry (represented by the production of hydraulic elements, metal processing, processing industry)

► Agriculture (mainly oilseed cultivation, rose oil production)

► Tourism

In the period 2014-2018, the total number of operating enterprises in Kazanlak municipality increased by 180. Micro-enterprises have the largest share, and in 2018 their number was 2,982. or 92.4% of the total. They increased their number by 155 in the period 2014-2018. Small enterprises are 6.3% of the total number, their increase is by 28. The share of medium-sized enterprises is 1.05%, and of large enterprises - 0.25%. A decrease in the number of medium-sized and large enterprises was observed, respectively by 1 and 2 in the period 2014-2018. The number of enterprises in the municipality is 20% of the number of the same in Stara Zagora district in 2018.

Net revenues from sales in the period 2014-2018 increased by BGN 6.54 thousand/inhabitant, with an increase for the country by BGN 9.27 thousand/inhabitant. At the end of 2018, the net sales revenue in the municipality reached 56.4% of the national average. Almost double the lower sales revenue compared to the national average indicates that the output produced has low added value and/or labor productivity is low.

Net revenue from sales per 1 resident as of 31.12. 2018 in thousand BGN/capita

Year	2014	2015	2016	2017	2018
Kazanlak Municipality	16.84	18.56	22,32	24.77	23.38
Bulgaria	3218	34.51	34.51	38.27	41.45

Source NSI regional statistics LAUI 2000-2019

=== Rose industry ===
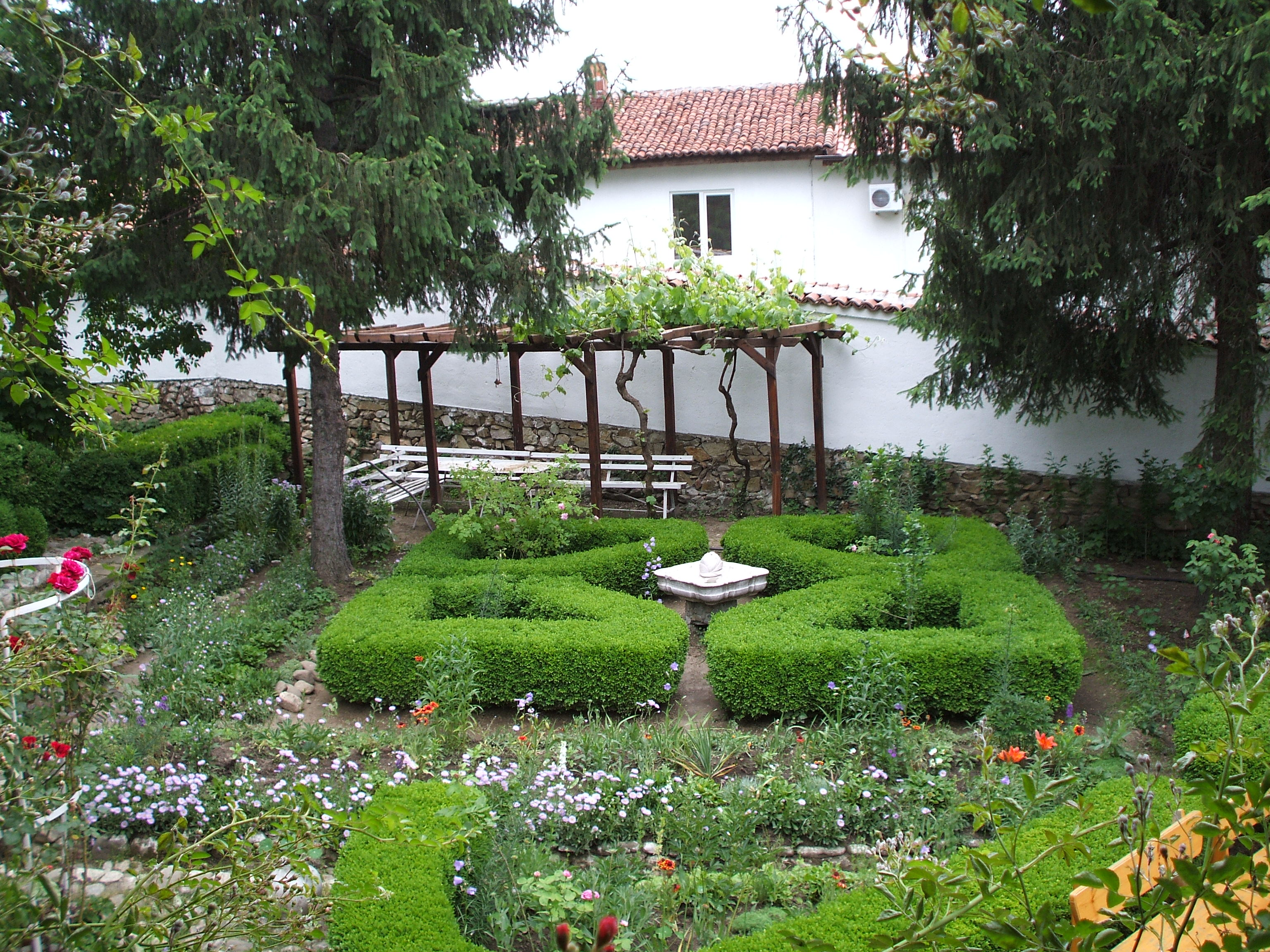
Courtyard of the Rose Museum.

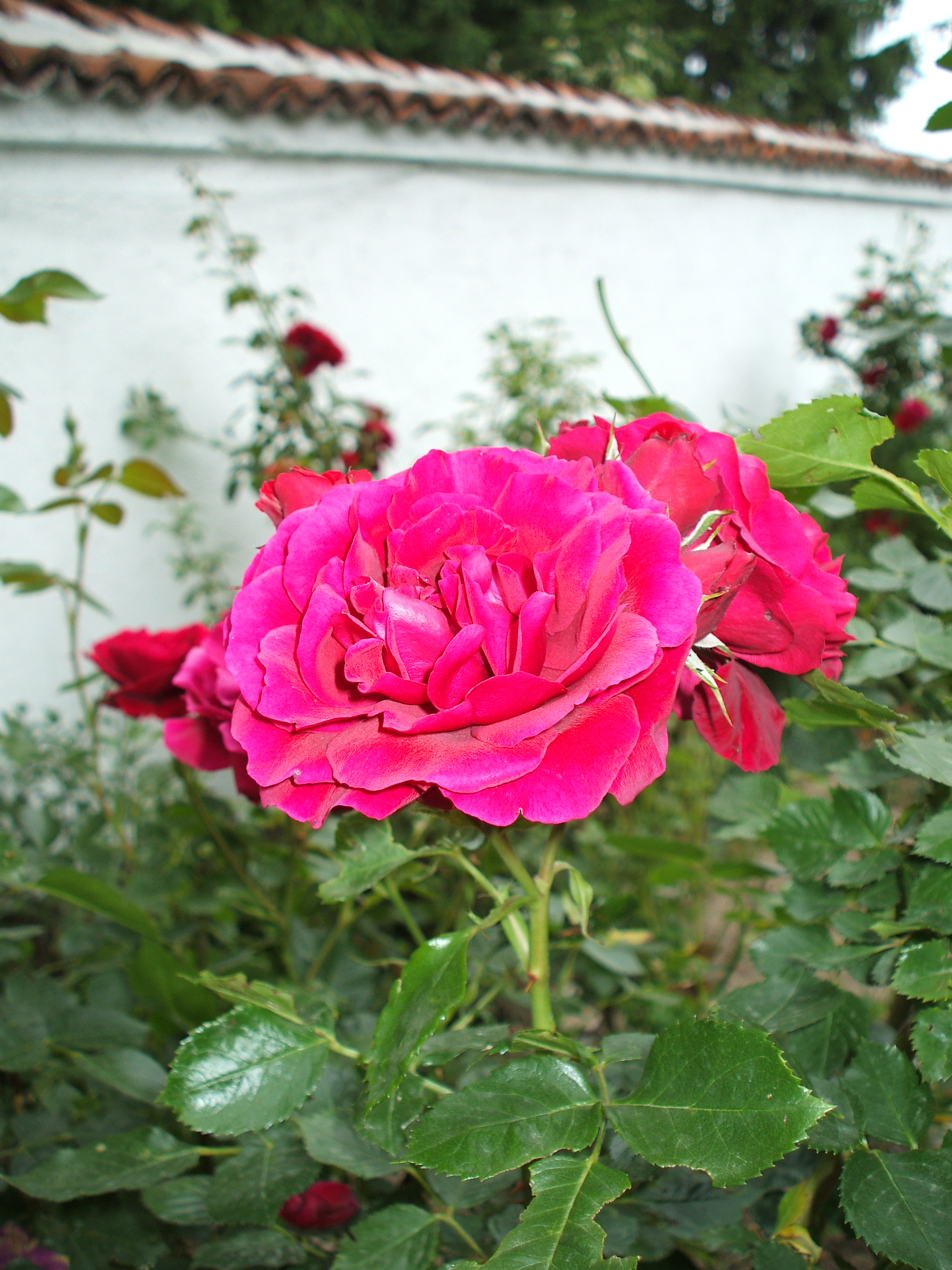
A rose in the Rose Museum.

The city lies at the eastern end of the famous Rose Valley. It is flanked with mid-height mountain ranges on opposite sides, and is especially marvelous in mid May when rose fields blossom and the fragrance is unparalleled. The harvesting of roses, and the production of rose oil for export to international parfumiers, is of major importance to the local economy. Here are a few oil factories: Lema Damascena

According to The Ultimate Visual Encyclopedia, Bulgaria is the major supplier of a certain type of rose oil in the world and Kazanlak's rose gardens are the largest rose gardens in the whole world.

==== Rose Festival ====
Rose Festival is one of the most remarkable events in Bulgaria, dedicated to beauty, flowers, spring and the fragrance of Kazanlak rose. In the year 2023 the festival marked its 120 year anniversary. The celebrations for the blossom of the roses their took place in the first week of June. The program for the whole week is full of attractions of all sorts: cultural, adventure and outdoors as well as culinary and wine exposes. The week also has a beauty pageant and on the last day of the celebrations, the girl said to be the most beautiful in the city is chosen. They call her "The Queen Of Roses" . The Rose Festival was celebrated for the first time in 1903 and since then it has traditionally been held during the first weekend of June. This is the season when the Kazanlak rose comes to bloom, filling the air with its scent. Nowadays the Rose Festival has evolved into an international event where thousands of tourists and guests of the town are entertained.

=== Other industries ===
The municipality of Kazanlak has a well-developed processing industry, which is also the most developed sector in the Stara Zagora region. Manufacturing companies contribute 75% of value added to the local economy and employ 66% of workers in 2019. The sector generates 55% of net income and 79% of payroll. The most significant production subsectors in terms of added value are the processing of metals and metal parts (63% of the added value in production), the production of machinery and equipment (21% of the added value). The productivity of the companies is guaranteed by capital investments in long-lasting tangible assets and by the active absorption of funding from European funds - a total of 29% of the amount for the region for the period 2014-2019.

Prominent among Kazanlak's manufacturers is Arsenal Corp. Founded in 1924, it manufactures and develops a wide range of military equipment, including small arms (especially AK models), anti-aircraft missiles, and heavy machine guns.

Also located in the city are M+S Hydraulic M+S Hydraulic and Caproni JSC, manufacturers of hydraulic components.

Kazanlak has three textile factories, one for woolen cloth, the second producing thread of different types and the last producing cloth from synthetic materials. Check: Bulgaria Tex and Bulgaria K

In Kazanlak is located for more than 90 years one of the biggest factories for musical instruments in the country Kremona .

► Micro- and small enterprises submitted 167 projects under the measure "Overcoming the shortage of funds and the lack of liquidity that occurred as a result of the epidemic explosion of COVID-19", and 108 of them received the maximum permissible support of BGN 10,000 (1,080 000 BGN in total), and the other 59 projects received support in the amount of BGN 324,870 in total. The amount of financial support received is BGN 1,404,870.

► 5 projects with a total value of BGN 136,078 were submitted under the measures "Support for SMEs carrying out bus transport to overcome the economic consequences of COVID-19" and "Support for medium-sized enterprises to overcome the economic consequences of the COVID-19 pandemic".

As of February 15, 2021, a total of 50 projects for nearly BGN 42 million have been submitted under the other OPIC measures, as follows:

► Priority axis "Technological development and innovation" - a total of 11 projects (10 completed, 1 in progress) with a total value of BGN 12,084,369

► Priority axis "Entrepreneurship and growth capacity of SMEs" - a total of 29 projects with a total value of BGN 19,795,811

► Priority axis "Energy and resource efficiency" - a total of 8 projects (7 completed and 1 in progress) with a total value of BGN 10,037,083.

To increase the competitiveness of enterprises on the territory of the municipality for the period 2014-2020, projects for nearly BGN 52 million are being implemented.

The economic development of Kazanlak municipality in recent years is characterized by certain dynamics. The data show a process of development and growth of the main economic indicators for the period from 2014 to 2019, which is proof of the stable economic condition of the municipality.

== Education ==
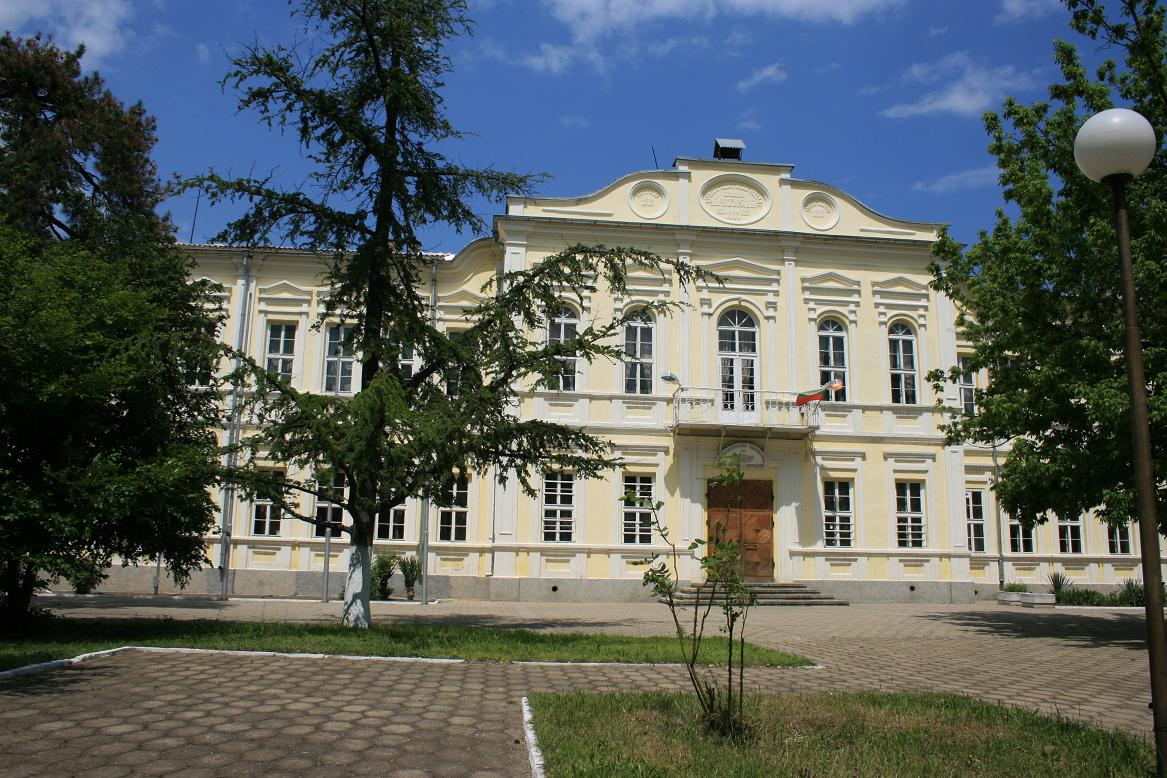
Sts. Cyril and Methodius High School

Kazanlak is home to the following schools:

- Exarch Anthim I Secondary School
- Paisiy Hilendarski Primary School
- Nikola Obreshkov High School of Science
- Sts. Cyril and Methodius High School
- Bulgarska Roza Secondary School
- Ivan Hadjienov Professional High School
- Mati Bolgaria Primary School
- Technical School of Transportation
- Vocational School of Hydraulics
- National High School of Plastic Arts and Design

== Notable people ==
- Hristo Yanev, football player of CSKA SOFIA
- Todor Yanchev, football player of CSKA SOFIA
- Chudomir, writer
- Ivan Enchev-Vidyu, painter and folklorist
- Emanuil Manolov, composer
- Petko Staynov, composer

Nikolo, tutor

- Nenko Balkanski, artist
- Svetla Ivanova, pop singer
- Elvira Georgieva, estrada and chalga singer
- Petko Orozov, philanthropist, Rose Oil industrialist and innovator
- Ivan Milev, artist
- Borislav Sabchev, religious philosopher / academic
- Petya Pendareva, athlete, 60 m silver medallist at the 2000 European Indoor Athletics Championships

== International relations ==
=== Twin towns – Sister cities ===
Kazanlak is twinned with:

Country	City	Date
Egypt	Alexandria	2006
Egypt	Luxor	2006
France	Grasse	2004
Iran	Kashan	2009
France	Saint-Herblain	2008
Greece	Veria Didymoteicho	2001 2021
Russia	Tolyatti	1994
Japan	Fukuyama	1995
North Macedonia	Kočani	2007
Hungary	Nagykanizsa	1970
Romania	Târgoviște	2004
China	Jinan, Shandong	2013

== Honour ==
Kazanlak Peak on Livingston Island in the South Shetland Islands, Antarctica is named after Kazanlak.
