= De Laet =

Dutch surname

De Laet is a Dutch-language occupational surname. A "laet" (modern spelling "laat") was a type of (released) serf. The archaic spelling De Laet is most common in Belgium, especially around Antwerp, while "de Laat" is more common in the Netherlands, especially in North Brabant. People with this name include:

De Laet / DeLaet

- Carlos de Laet (1847–1927), Brazilian journalist, professor and poet
- Jaspar Laet, 16th-century Flemish medical astrologer and almanac maker
- Graham DeLaet (born 1982), Canadian golfer
- Lost Frequencies, real name Felix De Laet (born 1993), Belgian DJ and record producer
- Joannes de Laet (1581–1649), Dutch geographer and director of the Dutch West India Company
- Ritchie De Laet (born 1988), Belgian footballer
- Miguel De Laet (born 1979), Brazilian musician, violin maker and guitar builder.

De Laat / DeLaat

- Itzhak de Laat (born 1994), Dutch short-track speed-skater
- Jacqueline DeLaat (1943–2009), American political scientist
- Sanne de Laat (born 1995), Dutch archer
