= Ivan Enchev-Vidyu =

Bulgarian artist, art critic, scenographer, archeologist and folklorist

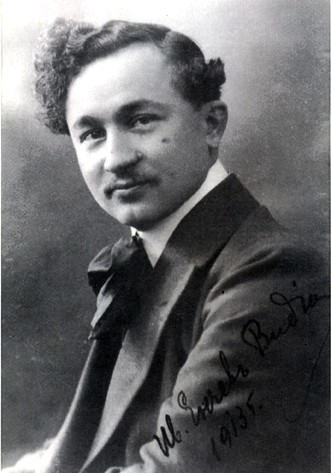
Ivan Enchev-Vidyu (1913)

Ivan Enchev-Vidyu (Bulgarian: Иван Енчев-Видю; 29 March 1882, Kazanlak - 27 August 1936, Burgas) was a Bulgarian painter, art critic, illustrator, decorator, cartoonist, scenographer, archaeologist and folklorist.

== Biography ==
He obtained his primary education at the teacher training school in his hometown. It was there that he first developed his interests in painting, theater and antiquities. In 1901, he enrolled at the National Academy of Art in Sofia, where he studied with Petko Klisurov and joined the local community of people from Kazanlak, known as "Rose Valley", after an area near their hometown.

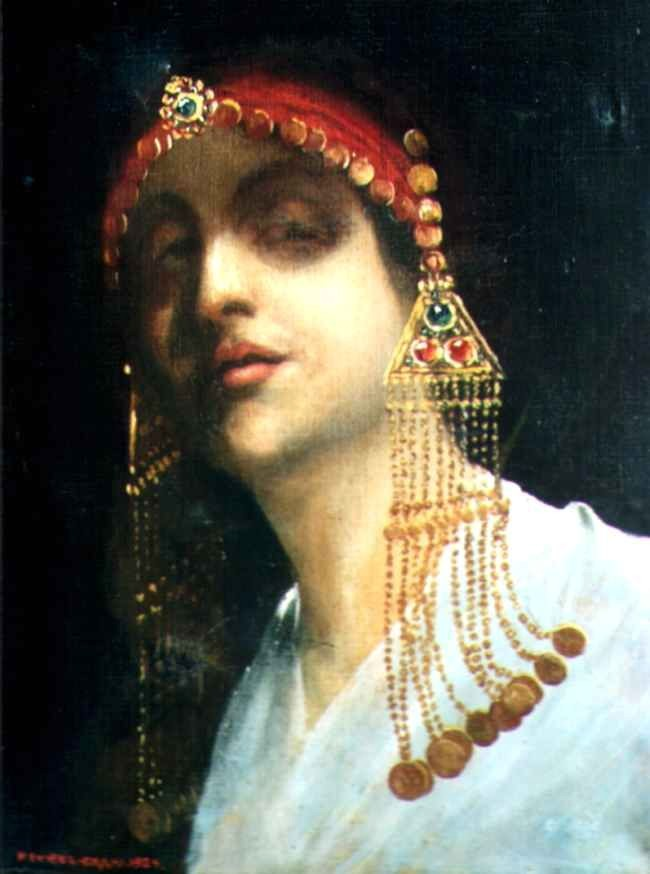
"Zahasia" (1924)

During this time he also helped establish the "Department of Antiquities" at the "Iskra Town History Museum" and made his public début with cartoons and illustrations for the local newspapers. Impressed by Professor Anton Mitov's lectures on art history, he began to write art criticism for the newspaper Ден (Today). He became so involved with this new interest, that he failed to attend his final exams at the academy.

He remained in Sofia a bit longer, then went to Munich, spending his days at the Alte Pinakothek, copying the Old Masters. In 1908, he returned home and donated fifteen of them to a new art museum. For the next few years, he exhibited his landscapes at the "Society of Artists of Bulgaria" in Sofia, but was not very successful. Instead, he decided to devote his energy to art research and critiques, written for Мир (Peace), the official organ of the People's Party. Although this required living in Sofia, he continued to participate in the affairs of his hometown.

In 1914, he entered a contest to create a new curtain for the main theater in Stara Zagora. Although his design was not chosen, it attracted the attention of Geo Milev and, two years later, he was invited to do the scenography for a production of Oedipus Rex. In 1918, he published a book on the ancient monuments of Dobruja. For almost twenty years, he worked as a researcher for the Ministry of Education and Science, producing numerous essays and monographs on Bulgarian art. He also continued to paint, producing portraits of notable figures such as Professor Marin Drinov and the politician Stefan Bobchev. He also designed Kazanlak's first coat of arms.

In 1927, he published his book of local history Розовата долина и Казанлък (The Rose Valley and Kazanlak). Following a stroke in 1936, he made a large donation to the art museum there; which included hundreds of books, decorations, costumes, icons and photographs. He died of a second stroke shortly after, while convalescing at the resort city of Burgas.

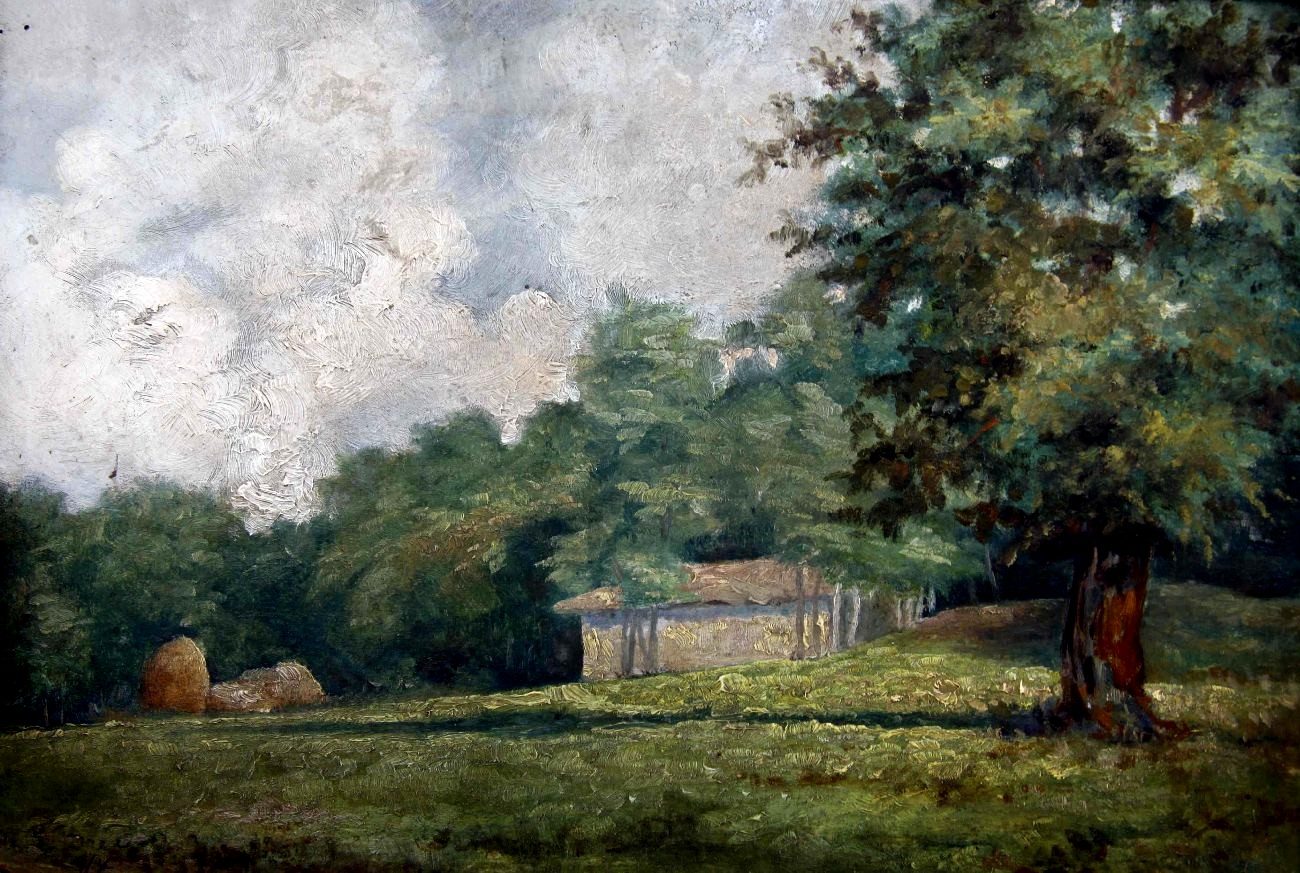
Landscape (1917)
