= Jaspar Laet =

Father and son medical astrologers and almanac makers

Jaspar Laet was the name of two medical astrologers and almanac makers, father and son, active in the Renaissance in the Low Countries.

== Career ==
Jaspar Laet the Elder was a native of Borgloon in the County of Loon (Prince-Bishopric of Liège) and appeared frequently in the civic account books of Antwerp among the "sworn physicians" in the service of the city between 1517 and 1530. He bore the titles "magister" and "physician".

Jaspar Laet the Younger was likewise born in Borgloon. He graduated doctor of medicine from the University of Leuven on 25 May 1512. His name appeared frequently in the civic account books of Antwerp among the "sworn physicians" in the service of the city between 1530 and 1542.

== Publications ==
- Gasparis Laet, Almanack pro XIII annis proximi futuris (Antwerp, Gerard Leeu, 1491)
- Jaspar Laet van Borcloen, Prognosticacie van den jare MCCCCCIII (Antwerp, 1503)
- Jaspar Laet van Borchloen, Pronosticatie van den jare MCCCCC en VI (n.p.d.)
- Jaspar Laet van Borchloen, Pronosticatie van den jare MCCCCC en VIII (n.p.d.)
- Magister Jasp. Laet de Borchloon, Phisicus Antuerpiensi, Prenostication Pro Anno Domini MCCCCCXVii (n.p.d.)
- Jaspart Laet, docteur en medecine de Louvain, Prenostication nouvelle pour lan mil cinq ces et XVII (n.p.d.)
- Jasparis Laet de Borchloen, Almanac pro anno domini milesimo CCCCCXX (Antwerp, Claes de Grave)
- Gasparis Laet de Borchloen, Prognosticum pro anno MCCCCCXXII (Antwerp, De Grave)
- Jaspar Laet de Borchloen, Almanack pro anno domini M.°ccccc.°XXIII (n.p.d.)
- Jaspaer Laet de jonghe, Almanack en prognosticatie voor 't jaer MCCCCCXXIV (Antwerp, Michiel Hillen van Hoochstraten)
- Jaspar Laet, Prognostication de lan de nostre Seigneur MCCCCCXL (Antwerp)
- Prognostication de lan de nostre Seigneur MDLI (Rouen)
- Jaspar Laet, Prognostication de lan de nostre seigneur MCCCCCLIX (Antwerp, Jan van Ghelen)
