= Emilia Entcheva =

Bulgarian–American engineer and academic

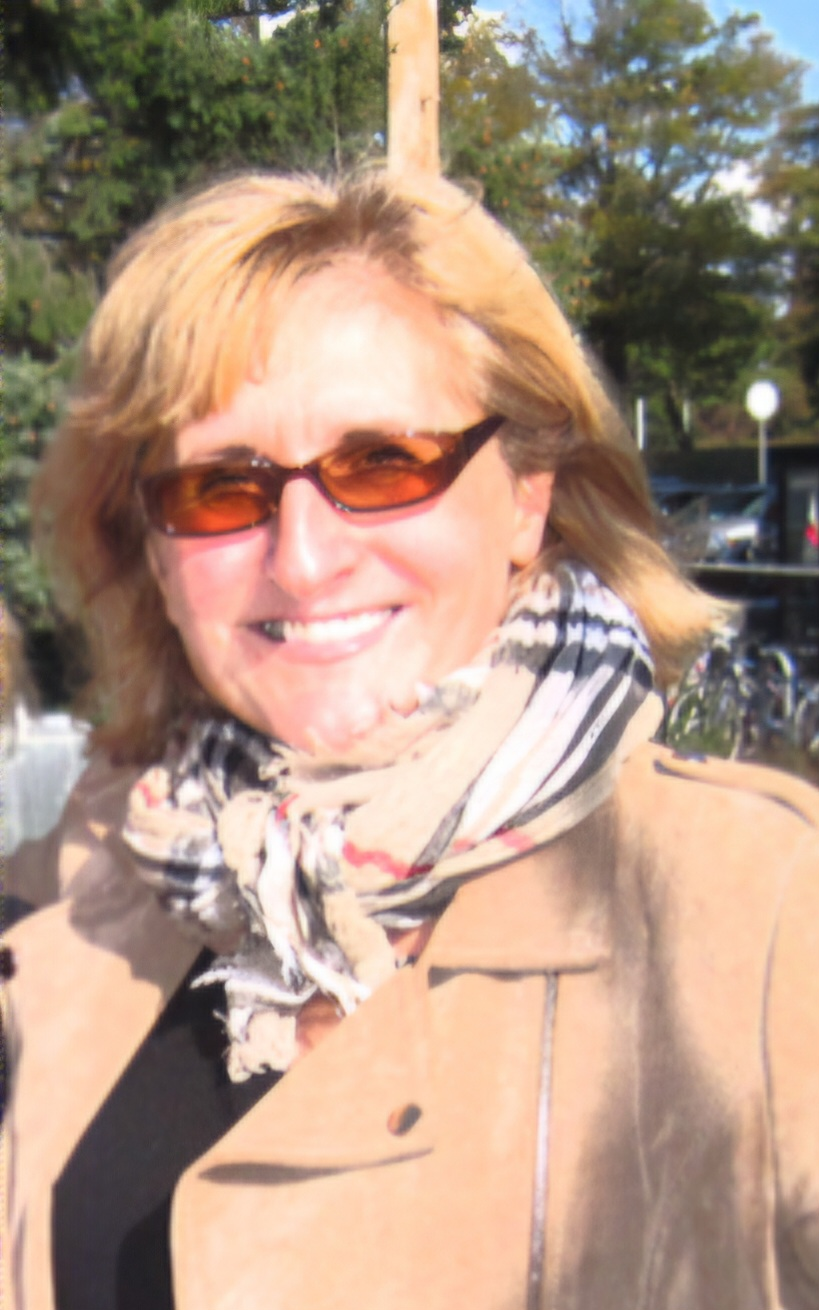
- Entcheva
- Education: University of Memphis; Technical University, Sofia
- Scientific career
- Workplaces: George Washington University; Stony Brook University; Johns Hopkins University
- Thesis: Cardiac tissue structure–electric field interactions in polarizing the heart: 3D computer models and applications

Emilia Entcheva (Bulgarian: Емилия Енчева) is a Bulgarian–American engineer who is a professor of biomedical engineering at George Washington University. She serves as Director of the Cardiac Optogenetics and Optical Imaging Laboratory. She is a Fellow of the Heart Rhythm Society and the American Institute for Medical and Biological Engineering.

== Early life and education ==
Entcheva studied electrical engineering at the Technical University, Sofia. She moved to the United States for graduate studies, joining the University of Memphis for a doctorate in biomedical engineering which she earned in 1998. Specifically, her work looked to understand how heart's fiber structure influences responses to external electric fields through bidomain finite element modeling. She conducted her postdoctoral work at Johns Hopkins University in 2001, developing fast optical mapping techniques for imaging excitation waves, that led to some of the first documentations of cardiac arrhythmias in a dish and their termination by electric fields.

== Research and career ==
In the early 2000s, Entcheva started her research group at Stony Brook University. She worked on cardiac cell and tissue engineering, optical mapping of arrhythmias, biomaterials, virus mediated gene delivery, systems biology and computational strategies for describing complex biological processes. In 2007, she started working on optogenetics: a strategy to control biological processes using light. She was among the first scientists to extend the applications of optogenetics to the heart for scalable drug testing platforms and for control of cardiac waves.

Entcheva moved to the Department of Biomedical Engineering at George Washington University in 2016. Her group continues to leverage cardiac optogenetics, optical mapping, human stem cell technology and gene modulation techniques to develop high-throughput testing platforms for drug screening and personalized medicine. These all-optical electrophysiology methods are scalable contactless means for comprehensive assessment of responses to drugs in heart cells and neurons; they are particularly useful in pre-clinical cardiotoxicity testing using human induced pluripotent stem cell derived cardiomyocytes (iPSC-CMs).

In 2016, Entcheva was inducted into the American Institute for Medical and Biological Engineering.

== Selected publications ==
- Xinhua Zong; Harold Bien; Chiung-Yin Chung; Lihong Yin; Dufei Fang; Benjamin S Hsiao; Benjamin Chu; Emilia Entcheva (September 1, 2005). "Electrospun fine-textured scaffolds for heart tissue constructs". Biomaterials. 26 (26): 5330–5338. doi:10.1016/j.biomaterials.2005.01.052. ISSN 0142-9612. PMID 15814131. Wikidata Q44984211.
- Emilia Entcheva; Harold Bien; Lihong Yin; Chiung-Yin Chung; Melissa Farrell; Yordan Kostov (November 1, 2004). "Functional cardiac cell constructs on cellulose-based scaffolding". Biomaterials. 25 (26): 5753–5762. doi:10.1016/j.biomaterials.2004.01.024. ISSN 0142-9612. PMID 15147821. Wikidata Q44899373.
- Zhiheng Jia; Virginijus Valiunas; Zongju Lu; et al. (August 9, 2011). "Stimulating cardiac muscle by light: cardiac optogenetics by cell delivery". Circulation: Arrhythmia and Electrophysiology. 4 (5): 753–760. doi:10.1161/circep.111.964247. ISSN 1941-3149. PMC 3209525. PMID 21828312. Wikidata Q38963429.
