= Pavel Banya =

Town in Stara Zagora, Bulgaria

Pavel Banya Павел баня
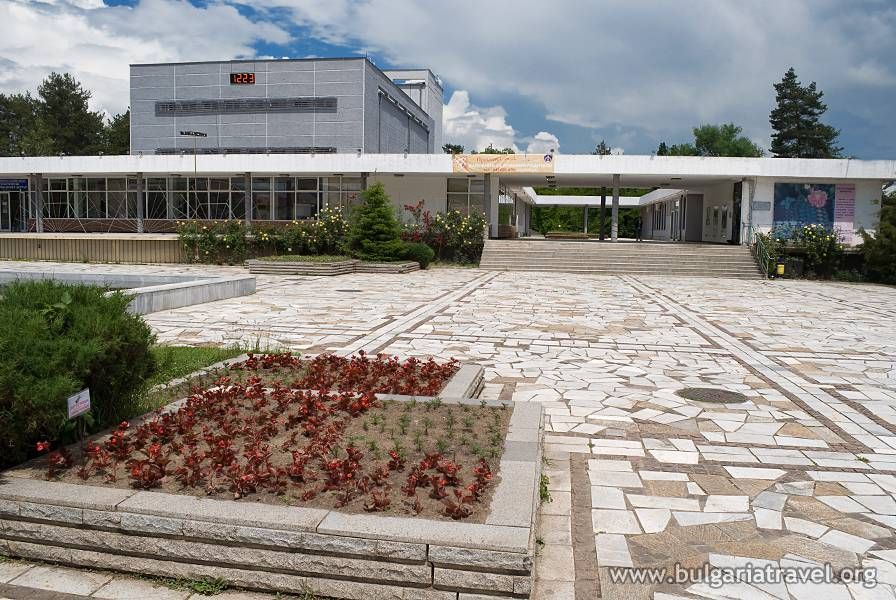
- Pavel Banya Center

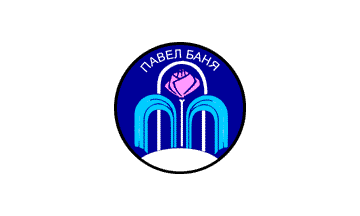
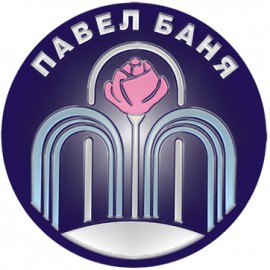
- Flag Seal

- Location of Pavel Banya
- Coordinates: 42°36′N 25°12′E
- Country: Bulgaria
- Province (Oblast): Stara Zagora
- Elevation: 423 m (1,388 ft)

Population (2021)
  - Total: 2,408
- Time zone: UTC+2 (EET)
  - Summer (DST): UTC+3 (EEST)
- Postal code: 6155
- Area code: 0357

Pavel Banya (Bulgarian: Павел баня) is a small town in Stara Zagora Province, south-central Bulgaria, between the towns of Kalofer and Kazanlak. It is the administrative centre of the homonymous Pavel Banya Municipality. As of December 2009 the town had a population of 2918. The place is famous for its mineral springs.

== Geography ==
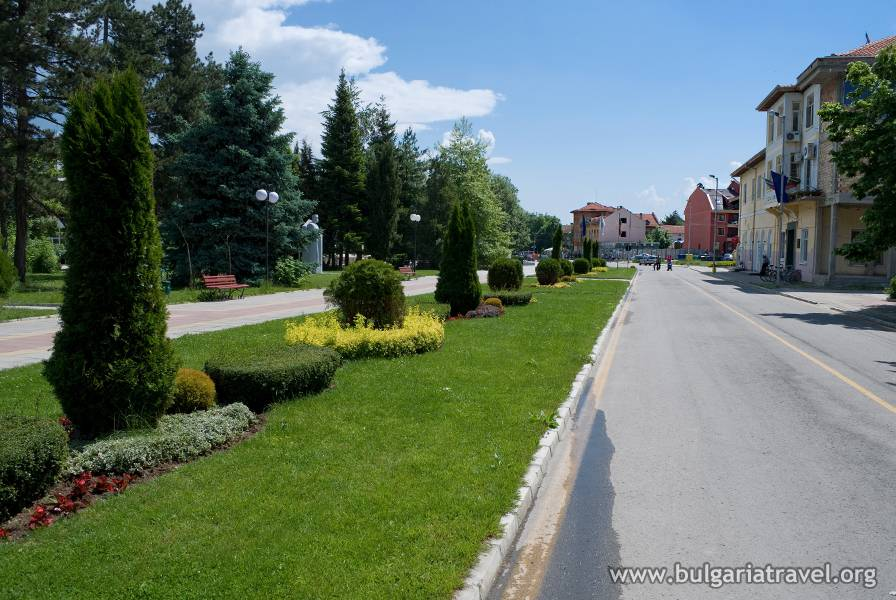
Local Pavel Banya street

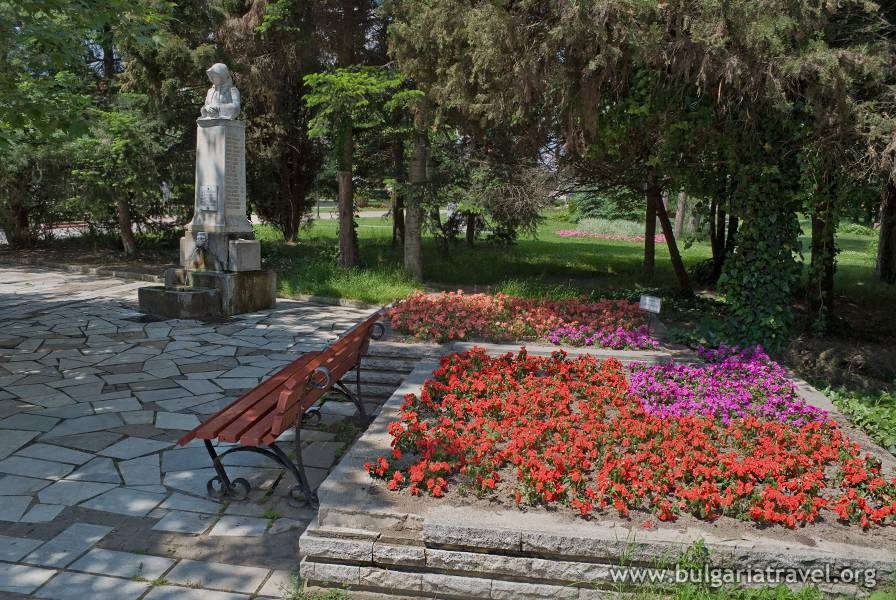
Park with Pavel Banya's famous roses

Pavel Banya is situated in the western part of the Kazanlak Valley, also known as the Rose Valley, enclosed between the Balkan Mountains and the Sredna Gora. The region is drained by the river Tundzha of the Maritsa drainage; the Koprinka Reservoir lies east of the town. It is 22 km west of Kazanlak and 185 km east of the capital Sofia. Some archeological finds include the tomb of the Thracian king Sevt III in the Golyama Kosmata and the tomb of the Thracian king Ostrusha.

== Climate ==
Since it is 400 metres (1,300 ft) above sea level, the town has a continental Mediterranean climate. Pavel Banya has warm summers, with an average of 22 °C (72 °F) in July, and colder winters, with an average of 1 °C (34 °F) in January.

== History ==
According to historical records, the current settlement was established on the site of a pre-existing locality. On the Russian three-verst military map from the period of the Russo-Turkish War (1877–1878), the area is marked as Lydzha Ali (Turkish: Ilıca – "warm mineral spring bath"). This name indicates that the area was known for its healing mineral springs and was permanently inhabited long before the modern history of the town.

Following the Liberation, in the late 19th century, settlers from the nearby village of Turiya, whose homes had been burned down during the war, established themselves at the site of the abandoned Turkish village of Lydzha Ali, taking advantage of the existing location near the springs. Initially, the new settlement was named Pavel. The main settlers comprised about ten families. Due to its natural wealth—the mineral water—the settlement gradually developed, and the first holiday bases were built. By Decree No. 1608 of 15 September 1978 (published in the State Gazette, issue 88 of 10 November 1978), Pavel Banya was declared a town.

The settlement was named after the Apostle Paul and the youngest son of Emperor Alexander II — Grand Duke Paul Alexandrovich.

== Religion ==
People of different religions live in Pavel Banya. The various religious holidays are respected by the populace. In the town, there is a Bulgarian Orthodox church. Although there is no mosque in Pavel Banya itself in the municipality, several of the surrounding villages, some of which are entirely or almost entirely ethnically Turkish, do have mosques. Many inhabitants of Pavel Banya are Turkish, and are therefore Muslim. They speak Bulgarian as well as Turkish, and are respected. They come to Pavel Banya for the natural mineral water, for purposes such as drinking and bathing.

== Politics ==
All Bulgarian political parties are represented in local politics. The mayor of the municipality, Stanimir Radevsky, was elected as an independent candidate. The two vice-mayors are from the Union of Democratic Forces and the Movement for Rights and Freedoms, respectively.

== Resources ==
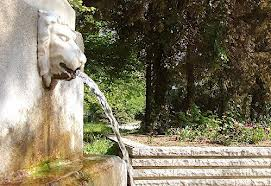
Pavel Banya's famous mineral water provided by a public fountain. Everyday, locals come to fill up cups and bottles of this water.

Mineral water in Pavel Banya is used in paid public and private baths for healing. Pavel Banya has nine hot springs with temperatures of around 50 degrees Celsius (122 degrees Fahrenheit). Two of the hot springs serve strictly for medical purposes and frequently admit patients with bone and joint disorders, orthopedic trauma, and central nervous system problems. The mineral water of Pavel Banya is characterized by weak mineralization (low quantity of dry matter per liter, about 2 grams) and hyperthermality – 57 to 59 degrees Celsius at the spring. The water is rich of hydrocarbon, metasilicon, radon, and fluorine. The mineral water in Pavel Banya is a large reason for nearby country-inhabitants to visit.

== Landmarks ==
Other than its fresh mineral water, Pavel Banya municipality is an appreciated Bulgarian town because of its variety of valuable landmarks in its area:

- In the Turiya village, Pavel Banya municipality, there is 200-year-old branchy Hornbeam, a rare species of tree.
- Parts of the Central Balkan National Park are included in the Pavel Banya Municipality territory
- Another interesting landmark is Chudomir's native house located in Turiya – the village where Dimitar Ivanov Chorbadzhiyski, a famous Bulgarian artist and writer, was born. Today the house of birth of Chudomir is transformed into an ethnographical house-museum.
- In the village of Tazha, there is an Ethnographic Exhibition.
- Dzhananova House in the village of Gabarevo – an old Revival house built in 1882 and declared a site of National value, houses the house-museum of Vasil Levski. Here Vasil Levski – the Apostle of Bulgarian Liberty, founded the local Revolutionary committee in 1869. Today the house-museum offers its visitors an exposition reproducing the authentic arrangement of a typical Gabarevo Revival house.
- The Raducheva kashta house – a restored house, situated in the village of Gabarevo and built in the 19th century is a site of interest to see. Its second floor houses a private museum dedicated to the way of life, culture and traditions of the Karakachans (Sarakatsani).
- The "St. George" Stone Church in Gabarevo village was built in 1885. The church is located in the center of the village. It fascinates its viewers with an exceptionally beautiful finely woodcarved iconostasis – made by Masters from the famous Tryavna Art School.
- Damascena ethnographic complex – gives the visitors in the area a unique opportunity to combine balneotherapy with cognition about the process of rose-oil distillation, which is so characteristic of this region. The complex includes:
1. Ethnographic collection containing folk style items used during the end of the 19th and the beginning of the 20th century
2. Old rose-oil distillation installation used some 350 years ago
3. Modern rose-oil distillery
4. Park planted with decorative roses
5. Places for relaxation (alcoves, walk alleys)

== Economy ==
Pavel Banya's economy is based on hydrotherapy tourism and cultivation of flower oils (lavender, Kazanlak roses, and salvia). Rose oil production in Pavel Banya Municipality is one of the main sectors of the local economy. On municipal territory there are 9 active distillery and over 5,000 acres (2,023 ha) rose plants.

== Environment, daily life, and activities ==
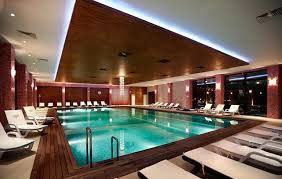
Mineral water pool in a spa resort

Pavel Banya consists mainly of rocky roads and gardens, surrounding a busy and bustling town square. Citizens often ride bicycles, walk around, and shop in the town center. Stray dogs and cats can be found at every corner, though most people take some dogs and cats in as their own, or feed them daily at a certain time. Because the inhabitants of Pavel Banya are not accustomed to internet devices, children are often seen playing outside.

== Events ==
A unique three-day feast is organized annually in the first days of June – The Rose and Mineral Water Festival. The festivities are very popular among Bulgarians and foreigners alike. The program includes an international folk festival, opening of the swimming season, rose picking, and a carnival; the festival culminates in selecting the Queen Rose. The culmination of the celebration is on the last day, when the ritual "Rose picking" and rose oil distilling are presented in traditional and modern techniques, then a spectacular procession of all participants in the celebration passes on the streets. The Feast takes place every year for three days at the end of the second week of June.

== Resorts and spas ==
Several hotels and spas can be found in Pavel Banya, containing large amounts of its famous mineral water. Nearly every spa has pools and other water facilities containing mineral water from the natural springs.
