= Jacqueline DeLaat =

American political scientist (1943–2009)

Jaqueline DeLaat
- Born: March 14, 1943; Chicago
- Died: April 24, 2009 (aged 66)
- Education: University of Iowa; University of Minnesota; University of Pittsburgh
- Scientific career
- Fields: Political science
- Workplaces: Waynesburg University; Bethany College; Marietta College; University of Maryland Global Campus

Jaqueline DeLaat (March 14, 1943 – April 24, 2009) was an American political scientist. She was the McCoy Professor of Political Science at Marietta College, where she worked from 1988 until 2009. Her research focused on public administration, women and politics, and gender studies.

== Life and career ==
DeLaat was born on March 14, 1943, in Chicago. She attended the University of Iowa, where she was a Phi Beta Kappa member. In 1967, DeLaat completed a master's degree in political science at the University of Minnesota. Following her master's degree, she spent 10 years working in Washington, D.C., first as a presidential management intern and then in a research capacity with the United States Information Agency. After working in lobbying organizations, she resumed studying academic political science in graduate school at the University of Pittsburgh, and in 1982 she completed a PhD in public administration and public policy.

In 1979 DeLaat joined the political science faculty at Waynesburg University. In 1982 she moved to Bethany College. In 1988, she became a professor of political science at Marietta College, where she remained until 2009, and would become the McCoy Professor of Political Science. She also taught remotely at the University of Maryland Global Campus (then called the University of Maryland University College).

Much of DeLaat's research focused on questions in public administration. She focused particularly on the relationship between the public, private, and non-profit sectors; for example, in the late 1980s she argued that volunteer activities common to these three sectors render them less competitive with one another than they are commonly understood to be. DeLaat also conducted research on women and politics, including articles on Clinton v. Jones, and work that she and Barbara Burrell were planning at the time of DeLaat's death on women who were political scientists and had run for public office. In addition to her research on women and politics, DeLaat also conducted practical research on gender studies. For example, in 1999 she published the book Gender in the workplace: A case study approach, which uses hypothetical cases of workplace gender issues to illustrate types of problematic scenarios that can arise in the workplace and how individuals and organizations can best respond to them. Relatedly, DeLaat was one of the authors of a series of studies in 2006 regarding the success rates of men and women in political science graduate programs in the Midwestern United States, to understand the obstacles to women's more rapid inclusion in the discipline of political science.

In 2003, DeLaat won a Fulbright Teaching Award, and she frequently taught courses at institutions outside the United States. DeLaat died on April 24, 2009.

== Selected works ==
- "Volunteering as Linkage in the Three Sectors", Nonprofit and Voluntary Sector Quarterly (1987)
- "Low-Life-Sleazy-Big-Haired-Trailer-Park Girl v. The President: The Paula Jones Case and the Law of Sexual Harassment", American University Journal of Gender, Social Policy & the Law, coauthored (2001)
- Gender in the workplace: A case study approach (1999)
