= Rose Valley, Bulgaria =

Area in central Bulgaria

Coordinates: 42°37′N 25°24′E

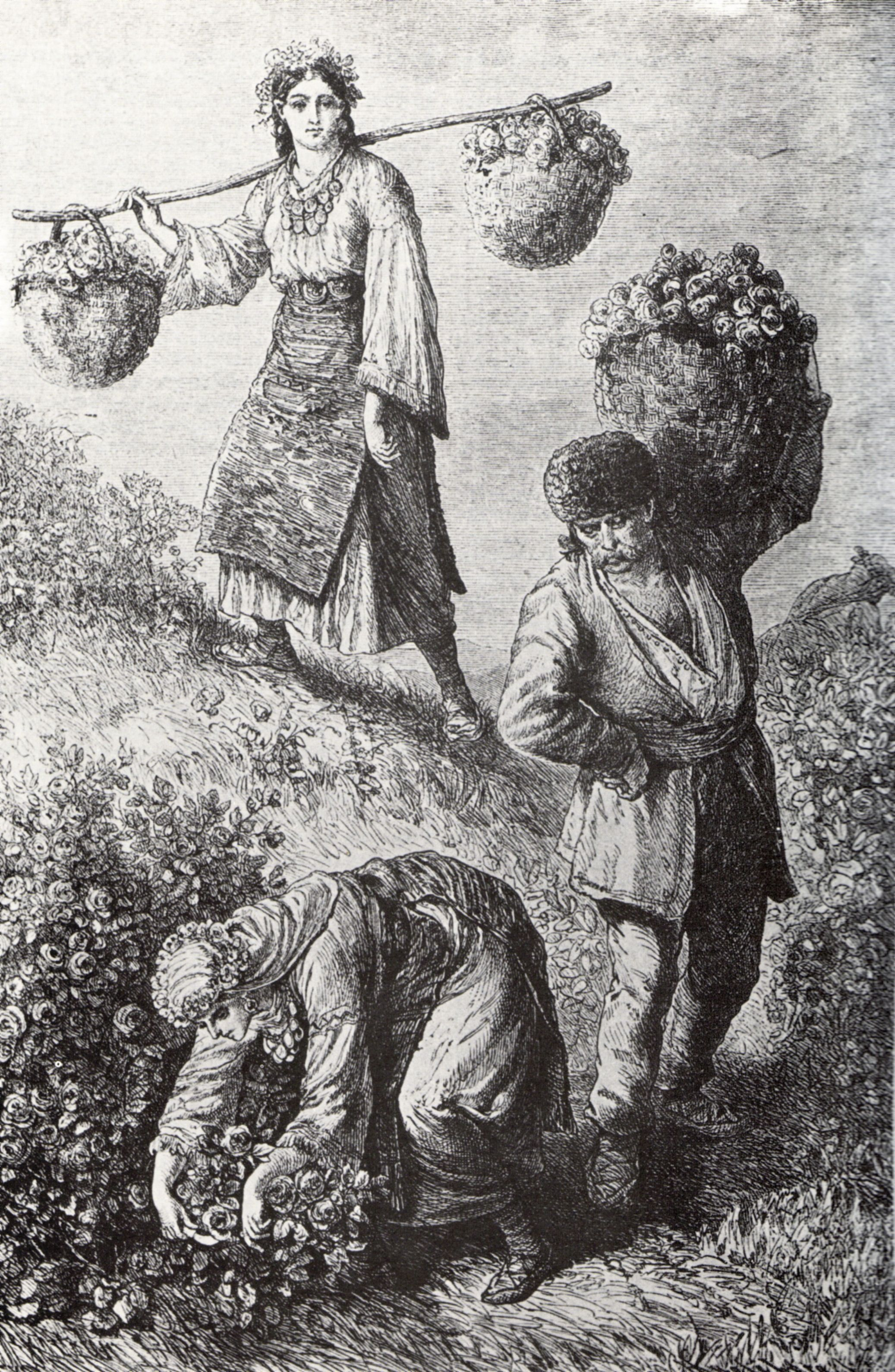
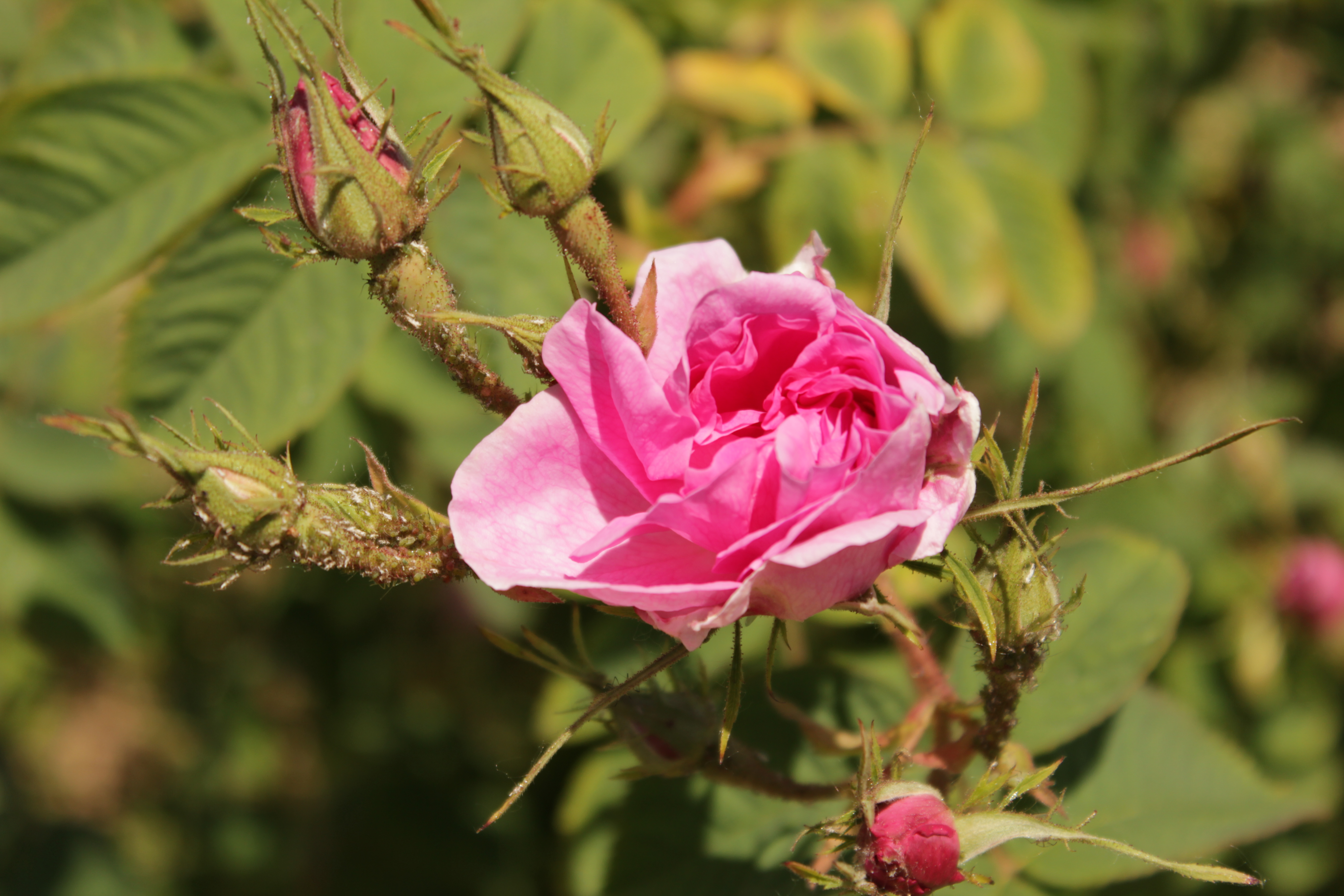
Left: Rose-picking in the Rose Valley near the town of Kazanlak in Bulgaria, 1870s, engraving by F. Kanitz; Right: View of the Rose Valley

The Rose Valley (Bulgarian: Розова долина, romanized: Rozova dolina) is a region in Bulgaria located just south of the Balkan Mountains, also known as "Old Mountain" in South Slavic languages, and the eastern part of the lower Sredna Gora mountain range to the south. Geologically, it consists of two separate valleys, Karlovo Valley on the river Stryama to the west and Kazanlak Valley on the river Tundzha to the east.

In September 2014 the European Commission approved Bulgarian rose oil (Bulgarian: Българско розово масло, romanized: Bulgarsko rozovo maslo) as a new Protected Geographical Indication (PGI).

== Description ==
The Rose Valley of Kazanlak stretches for 10-12 kilometers and is 95 kilometers long with an average height of 350 meters and an area of 1895 square kilometers.

Respectively, the Kalofer Valley of Roses covers an area of 1387 square kilometers with a length of 55 kilometers and 16 kilometers width.

The valley is famous for its rose-growing industry which have been cultivated there for centuries, and which produces close to half (1.7 tonnes) of the world's rose oil. The centre of the rose oil industry is Kazanlak, while other towns of importance include Karlovo, Sopot, Kalofer and Pavel banya. Each year, festivals are held celebrating roses and rose oil.

The picking season lasts from May to June. During this period, the area gives off a pleasant scent and is covered with multi-coloured flowers. The gathering process, traditionally a woman's task, requires great dexterity and patience. The flowers are carefully cut one by one and laid in willow-baskets which are then sent to the distilleries. Tourists are welcome to join the rose-picking process, usually on weekend mornings when special ritual reenactments are organized in villages around Kazanlak.

== Climate impact on Rose Valley ==
The traditional rose harvesting season in Rose Valley has seen significant alterations due to climate variations. Data from the Bulgarian National Institute of Meteorology and Hydrology reveals that in 2024, the onset of rose blooming commenced nearly a month earlier than the historical average, which is typically observed between June 10 and 20. This shift is attributed to an unusually mild winter followed by a warm spring, factors that have notably accelerated the blooming process. Climate scientists associate these atypical weather patterns with broader climate change dynamics. Notably, Europe, identified as the fastest-warming continent, registered temperatures in 2023 that were 2.5 degrees Celsius (4.5 degrees Fahrenheit) above the preindustrial average. This warming trend has direct implications for agricultural practices in Rose Valley, impacting both the timing and quality of rose-derived products, crucial to Bulgaria's economy and cultural heritage.

== Honour ==
Rose Valley Glacier on Livingston Island in the South Shetland Islands, Antarctica, is named after the Rose Valley.

== See also ==
- Rosa × damascena
