= Bulgarian national garb =

Folk costumes of Bulgaria

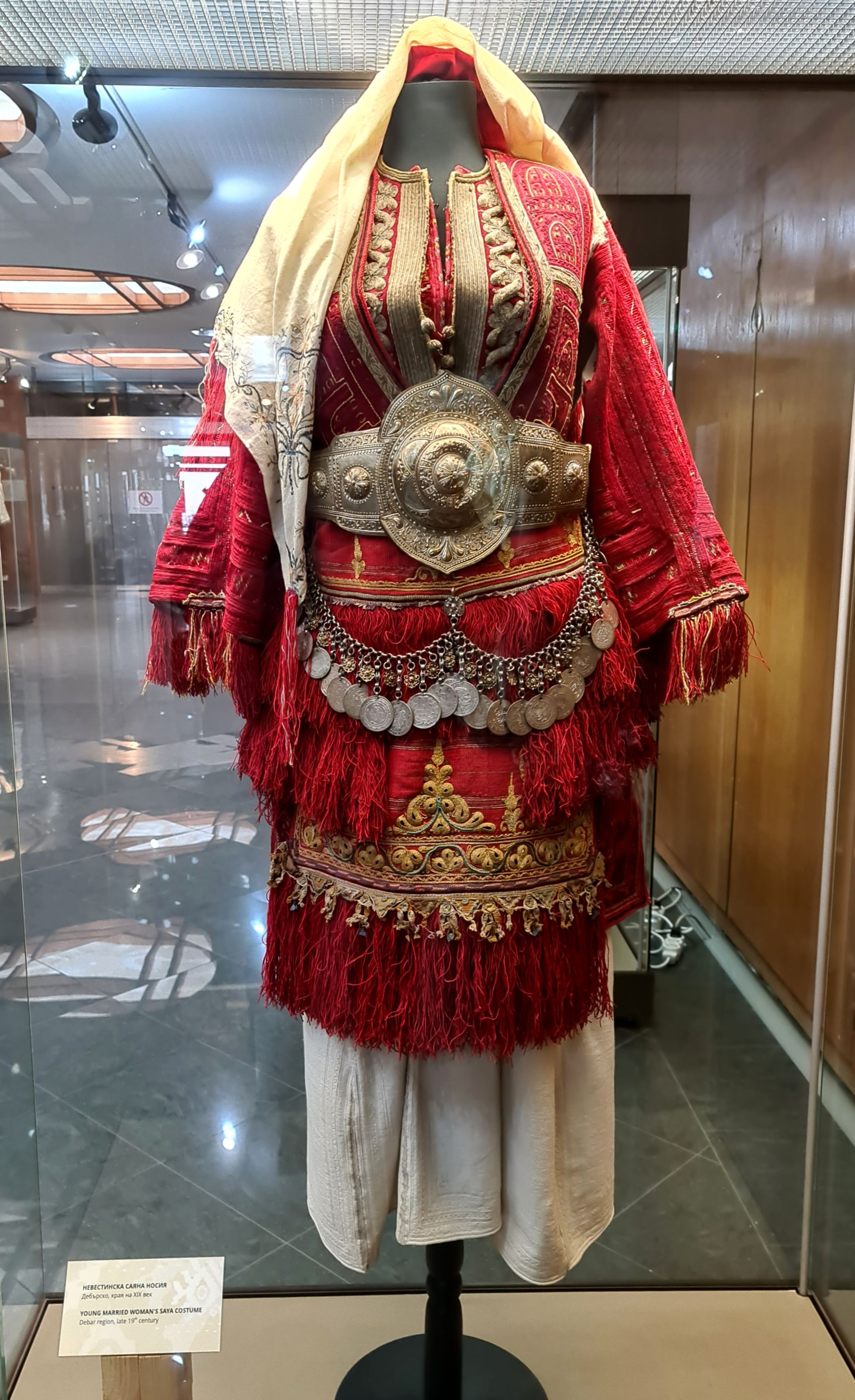
Traditional Bulgarian Bride Sayan Costume, National History Museum, Sofia.

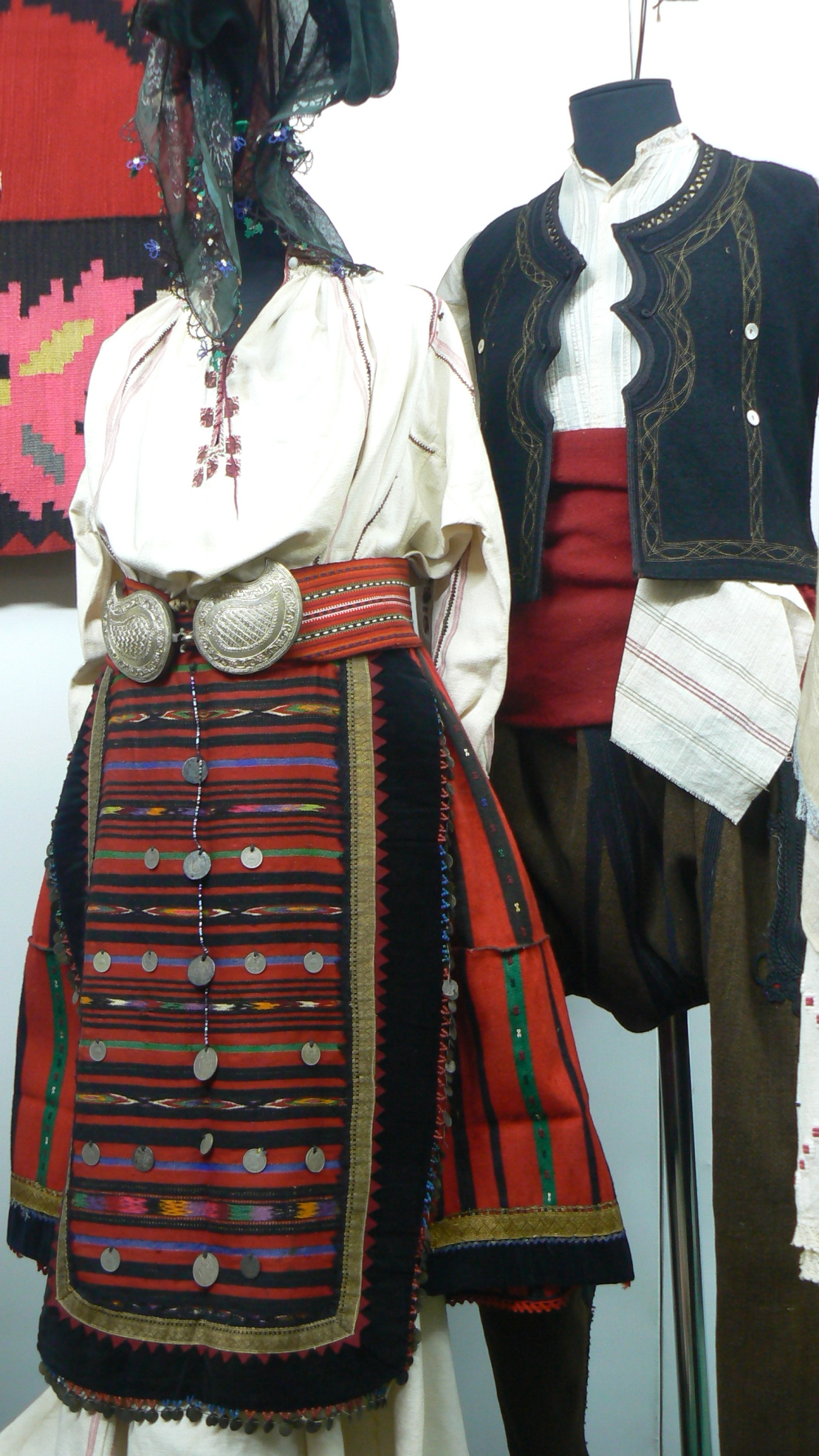
19 century female and male costumes from Vratsa region.

The Bulgarian national garb is a symbolic part of Bulgarian culture. It conveys information about the person wearing it via embroidery of diverse symbols. The garbs are usually in bright colors, but black leather is also used.

== History ==
The Bulgarian national garbs appear from the Bulgarian National Revival to the middle of 20th century. The women's costume are composed of: pinafore, skirt, buckles, apron, Bulgarian jewelry and others. The men's costume are composed of: full-bottomed breeches, girdle, vest, shirt and others. During the Bulgarian National Revival Bulgarians manufactured themselves the Bulgarian national garb.

== Types of the folklore costume ==
- Dobruja
- Rhodope
- Pirin Macedonian
- Northern
- Strandzha
- Thracian
- Shopluk

== Decoration ==
Bulgarian traditional clothing is diverse, and every ethnographic area in Bulgaria has its distinct styles. Bulgarians call their traditional clothing 'носия' (nosiya).

Each nosiya is unique to the person wearing it. They were embroidered with symbols called 'шевици'. These 'shevitsi' were special because they showed the personality, status, goals, and wishes of the wearer. The embroideries on the clothes were not just patterns, but ancient motifs passed down from generation to generation. Few know how old this tradition is. The cut of the Bulgarian skirts and dresses, the embroidered ornaments on them, etc. are at least 3500 years old. The embroidered ornaments are part of the Bulgarian folk art, which originates from the ancient art of Slavs and Proto-Bulgarians, enriched by the influence of other peoples with whom the Bulgarian ethnic group has had contact over the centuries. We find similarities with the cultural traditions of the peoples of Tibet, China, Mongolia, Central Asia, Volga Bulgaria, Danube Bulgaria, and others. The prototype of the embroidered ornaments is considered to be the tattoo of the naked body. With the advent of fabrics, these ornaments are transferred to clothing. This happened during the Bronze Age of Thrace, and the origin of many of the motifs is even more ancient - they appear in the Copper-Stone Age.

Bulgarian embroidery ornaments developed with the development of Slavic and Proto-Bulgarian culture. With the unification of the two peoples, the intertwining of embroidery ornaments from both cultures gradually began to be observed. It was believed they protected the human body from spells and evil spirits. People believed that if someone cut off part of the embroidery of a garment, it gives way to evil spirits and makes a person more vulnerable. Bulgarian maidens were allowed to embroider only until their wedding. After that, they had the right to do so only when their daughters turned 12 and it was good to teach them. The girls began embroidering their chaise at the age of 12, and this was the highest art form created at home by anyone else. Some examples of shevitsi are:

=== Symbols ===
==== The tree of life ====
One of the oldest ornaments. The crown represents the firmament (upper, celestial world) with its real and supernatural inhabitants - God, angels, saints, and birds. The trunk separates Heaven from Earth and corresponds to the middle, earthly, human world. The roots symbolize the underworld. It is the Axis of the world, the connection between the earth and the sky, it is a symbol of the Circle of Life - every spring, it leaves again, and when winter arrives, all the leaves fall off.

==== "Celestial turtle" ====
It represents three intertwined eights, forming an endless labyrinth and is one of the symbols of protection used by Bulgarians' ancestors. It embodies the idea of the interconnectedness of everything in the universe. It is believed that the Celestial Turtle, also called the Space Turtle, Pletenitsa, originated from the ancient Proto-Bulgarians and was a symbol of the god Tangra.

==== The cross ====
People believed that the cross protected them from diseases and all kinds of troubles. As the population gradually became Christianized, the cross took on a new meaning and started being perceived as a symbol of the Christian God.

==== The big scissors ====
These are two triangles that have merged their tops, forming a wedding sign. This figure contains the concept of the divine and earthly nature, of the masculine and feminine, of the pursuit of harmony and balance.

==== The Mother Goddess ====
The Mother Goddess was depicted as a pregnant woman giving birth, with the sun and the moon on either side of her. It was a symbol of fertility.

==== The swastika ====
The swastika was sacred. It was a symbol of the god Svarog. It was believed that it had a protective function to protect against evil, and at the same time attracts prosperity, fortune, and fertility. However, after Adolf Hitler, this symbol became taboo amongst Bulgarians.

=== Colors ===
The colors of the shevitsi mattered, too. People would embroider with specific colors for specific reasons.

==== Red ====
The color red symbolizes blood and fire, life and fertility. It protects against evil forces and animals waking up in early spring (with the warming of the weather), protects against black magic, and spells. Red is associated with masculine strength and courage, and for women - fertility and vitality. Because of this, during weddings in some regions of Bulgaria, the bride wore a red veil. In the rituals of the ancient eastern peoples, reproducing the "sacred marriage" between heaven and earth, red was used to depict the earth. For many ancient peoples such as the Romans, Greeks, and Egyptians, red was also a leading color in rituals and ceremonies.

==== Green ====
The green color is a symbol of nature, freshness, health, and youth, reviving nature and hope. The color green is also associated with the Tree of Life - the universal human symbol of the universe, with immortality and eternity. It is a known fact that contemplation of the color green calms the psyche.

==== Yellow ====
Yellow or "gold" is a symbol of the Sun and light, of the divine and the sacred, of moral purity and mercy, of prosperity and wealth. Studies show that yellow helps to increase brain activity and improve memory. In Christendom, the "golden" symbolizes God and the sacred.

==== Blue ====
The blue color represents the sky, space, and water. It embodies truth and trust, purity, serenity, and contemplation. Blue is the color of angels, at high spiritual levels. It is often used in combination with its "opposite" warm red color. Most often this happens by comparing or "merging" the sky (blue) and the earth (red, as we mentioned above).

==== White ====
Most cultures associate white with purity, truth, and innocence. In different Bulgarian regions, white can be interpreted in several ways. In the Eastern Rhodopes, it is customary to make a wedding mask for the bride with white paint and colored beads. On the other hand, although rare, white has been associated with death. In the Strandzha region for centuries, the mourning was in white, because the haiduti who went to the gallows were dressed in white shirts. White is also a symbol of wisdom, knowledge, and infinity.
