= List of Bulgarian painters =

Following is an alphabetical list of Bulgarian painters.

== A–M ==
- Gavril Atanasov (1863–1945)
- Nikola Avramov (1897–1945)
- Ilia Beshkov (1901–1958)
- Dora Boneva (born 1936)
- Daria Vassilyanska (1928–2017)
- Zlatyu Boyadzhiev (1901–1976)
- Christo (1935–2020)
- Chudomir (1890–1976)
- Vladimir Dimitrov (1882–1960) – known as "the Master"
- Silvia Dimitrova (born 1970)
- Nikolay Diulgheroff (1901–1982)
- Dimitar Dobrovich (1816–1905)
- Stanislav Dospevski (1823–1878)
- Ivan Enchev-Vidyu (1882–1936)
- Rumen Gasharov (born 1936)
- Pencho Georgiev (1900–1940)
- Atanas Hranov (born 1961)
- Oda Jaune (born 1973)
- Ivan Kirkov (1932–2010)
- Anastas Konstantinov (1956–2017)
- Nadezhda Kouteva
- Tsanko Lavrenov (1896–1978)
- Nikola Marinov (1879–1948)
- Violeta Maslarova (1925–2006)
- Dimitre Mehandjiysky (1915–1999)
- Angel Metodiev (1921–1984)
- Ivan Milev (1897–1927)
- Anton Mitov (1862–1930)
- Georgi Mitov (1875–1900)
- Ivan Mrkvička (1856–1938)

== N–Z ==
- Gencho Nakev (born 1962)
- Radi Nedelchev (born 1938)
- Ivan Nenov (1902–1997)
- Joseph Oberbauer (1853–1926)
- Bencho Obreshkov (1899–1970)
- George Papazov (1894–1972)
- Georgi Yanakiev (1941–2018)
- Pascin (1885–1930)
- Nikolai Pavlovich (1835–1894)
- Houben R.T. (born 1970)
- Ekaterina Savova-Nenova
- Konstantin Shtarkelov (1889–1961)
- Alexander Telalim (born 1966)
- Dechko Uzunov (1899–1986)
- Daria Vassilyanska (1928–2017)
- Jaroslav Věšín (1860–1915)
- Keraca Visulčeva (1910–2004)
- Ivan Vukadinov (born 1932)
- Hristofor Zhefarovich (c.1690–1753)
- Zahari Zograf (1810–1853)

== See also ==
- Culture of Bulgaria
- List of Bulgarian artists
