= List of Bulgarian artists =

== Nineteenth century ==
- Zahari Zograf (1810–1853) – church mural paintings and icons
- Stanislav Dospevski (1823–1878) – painter
- Ivan Mrkvicka (1856–1938) – genre composition
- Jaroslav Vesin (1860–1915) – genre composition

== Twentieth century ==
- Vladimir Dimitrov - Maistora (1882–1960) – painter
- Pascin (Julius Mordecai Pincas) (1885–1935) – expressionist
- Dechko Uzunov (1899-1986) – painter
- Sultana Suruzhon (1900–1960) – modernist painting
- Kyril Vassilev (1908–1987) – portraits

== Twentieth century (post World War II) ==
- Keratza Vissulceva (1911–2004) – oil on canvas
- Violeta Maslarova (1925–2006) – painting
- Daria Vassilyanska (1928–2017) – painting
- Christo Javacheff (1935–2020) – installation art
- Radi Nedelchev (born 1938) – naive/folk art
- Georgi Janakiev (1941–2018) – graffics/painting
- Ivan Minekov (born 1947) – sculpture
- Atanas Hranov (born 1961) – painting, sculpture
- Alexander Telalim (born 1966) – painting, watercolor
- Nadezhda Kouteva – painting
- Gredi Assa - painting
- Rumy Renan - graffics/ painting

== Twenty-first century ==
- Svetlana Mircheva (born 1976) – contemporary artist, media art
- Boryana Rossa (born 1972) – performance art, video and photography
- Yanko Tihov (born 1977) – painting

== See also ==
- Process-Space Festival (Bulgaria)
- Art genre
