= Yordanka =

Yordanka is a feminine Bulgarian given name, the female variant of Yordan. Its hypocoristic form is Dani. Notable people with the name include:

- Yordanka Blagoeva (born 1957), Bulgarian athlete
- Yordanka Donkova (born 1961), Bulgarian athlete
- Yordanka Fandakova (born 1962), Bulgarian politician
- Yordanka Hristova (born 1943), Bulgarian singer
- Yordanka Pujol (born 1990), Cuban water polo player
- Yordanka Ariosa, Cuban actress
