= Georgi Yanakiev =

- Георги Янакиев
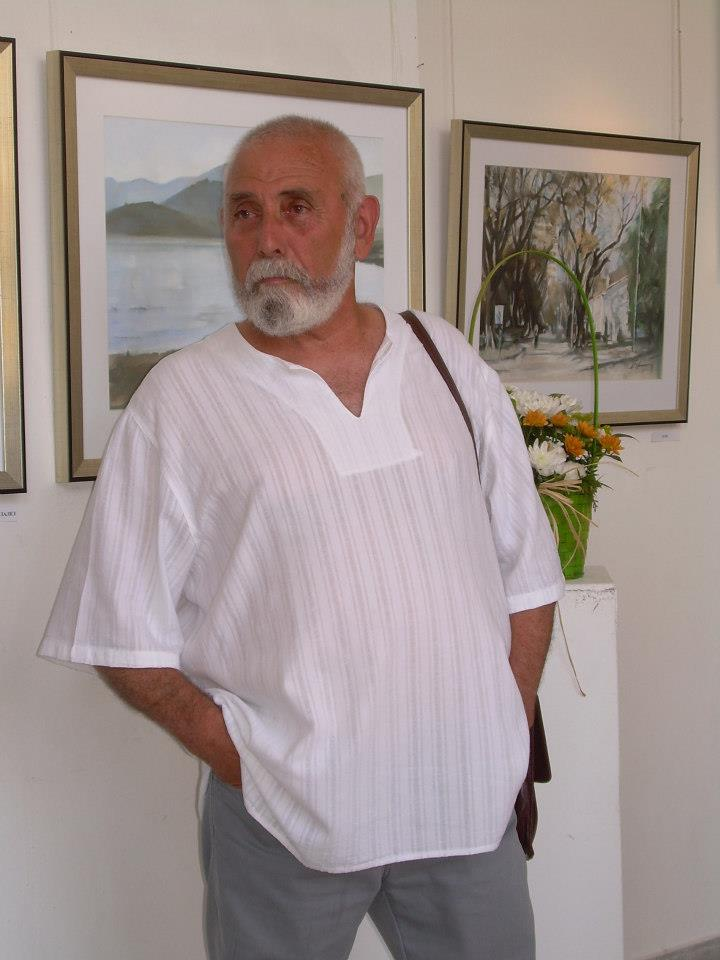
- Born: Georgi Stoyanov Yanakiev; May 6, 1941; Veselie, Burgas Province, Kingdom of Bulgaria
- Died: March 1, 2018 (aged 76); Sliven, Bulgaria
- Education: National Academy of Arts (1964–1970)
- Known for: Painting, graphic art, soft pastel, illustration
- Notable work: "The Dance of the Vines" "The Blue Stones" "Sedlarevo Flowers"
- Awards: Honorary Award from Todor Zhivkov (1970); Honorary Badge from the Municipality of Sliven (2016)
- Patrons: Evtim Tomov; Zafir Yonchev; Petar Chuklev
- Website: georgijanakiev

Georgi Stoyanov Yanakiev (Bulgarian: Георги Стоянов Янакиев; 6 May 1941 – 1 March 2018) was a Bulgarian painter, teacher, and graphic artist, one of the main representatives of Bulgarian graphic art, illustration, and painting. He was one of the most distinguished masters of the soft pastel technique in Bulgaria and a longtime teacher at the National Art School "Dimitar Dobrovich" in Sliven.

== Biography ==
=== Early years and education ===
Yanakiev was born on 6 May 1941 in the village of Veselie, Burgas Province. His childhood and youth were spent in the Burgas region, where his deep attachment to nature and landscape as a central theme in his work was formed.

In 1964, he was admitted to the National Academy of Art in Sofia (then the Higher Institute of Fine Arts "Nikolay Pavlovich") with a specialization in graphic art. His teachers included renowned Bulgarian artists Evtim Tomov, Zafir Yonchev, and Petar Chuklev. In 1970, he graduated with honors and was awarded an honorary prize by Todor Zhivkov, Chairman of the State Council—an exceptionally rare distinction for a graduating student that testified to his extraordinary abilities.

=== Creative maturity and professional career ===
In 1971, he was assigned to work in Sliven as the chief artist of the municipality, where he remained until the end of his life. He became a member of the Union of Bulgarian Artists – Sliven branch. For many years, he was a teacher of drawing and painting at the National Art School "Dimitar Dobrovich" in Sliven, where he taught alongside his colleague Yordan Parushev.

Among his students was the graphic artist and illustrator Damyan Damyanov (born 1982), who graduated from the Sliven gymnasium and later became a recipient of numerous national awards in graphic design and illustration.

=== Final years ===
In 2014, he suffered a severe ischemic stroke but continued his creative work. In October 2016, he was awarded an Honorary Badge by the Mayor of Sliven Municipality for his long-standing contribution to the cultural life of the city. Despite health problems, he continued to participate in exhibitions. In November 2017, he organized his final solo exhibition during his lifetime at Gallery "May" in Sliven, just four months before his death.

He died on 1 March 2018 from cancer at the age of 76.

== Artistic work ==
=== Style and technique ===
Georgi Yanakiev was among the most distinguished Bulgarian masters of the soft pastel technique. In a 2012 interview, he shared: "I draw with soft pastel and prefer it because the technique is the same as drawing with charcoal. I love drawing with charcoal. The mixing of colors is the other thing that inspires me to convey what I think and, most importantly, certain states, whether of a person or of nature."

He worked in the fields of painting, graphic art, and illustration. His artistic legacy consists mainly of landscapes from the Burgas region and Sliven area, still lifes with an emphasis on flowers, and seascapes from Sozopol.

=== Themes and inspiration ===
About his inspiration, the artist shared: "Inspiration comes with drawing. For me, this is the moment when I feel that the painting is beginning to come alive."

The main themes in his work include:

- Landscapes of native nature – The Blue Stones, Kutelka Peak, Sedlarevo
- Still lifes with rich color palettes
- Seascapes from the Black Sea coast
- Urban motifs from Sliven

=== Creative principles ===
"An artist must know what he is doing and how he is doing it!" was one of the maxims Yanakiev shared in an interview. About the learning process, he added: "I am for artists who learn all their lives, and I am one of them. I draw because it gives me pleasure."

== Gallery ==
Paintings by Georgi Yanakiev

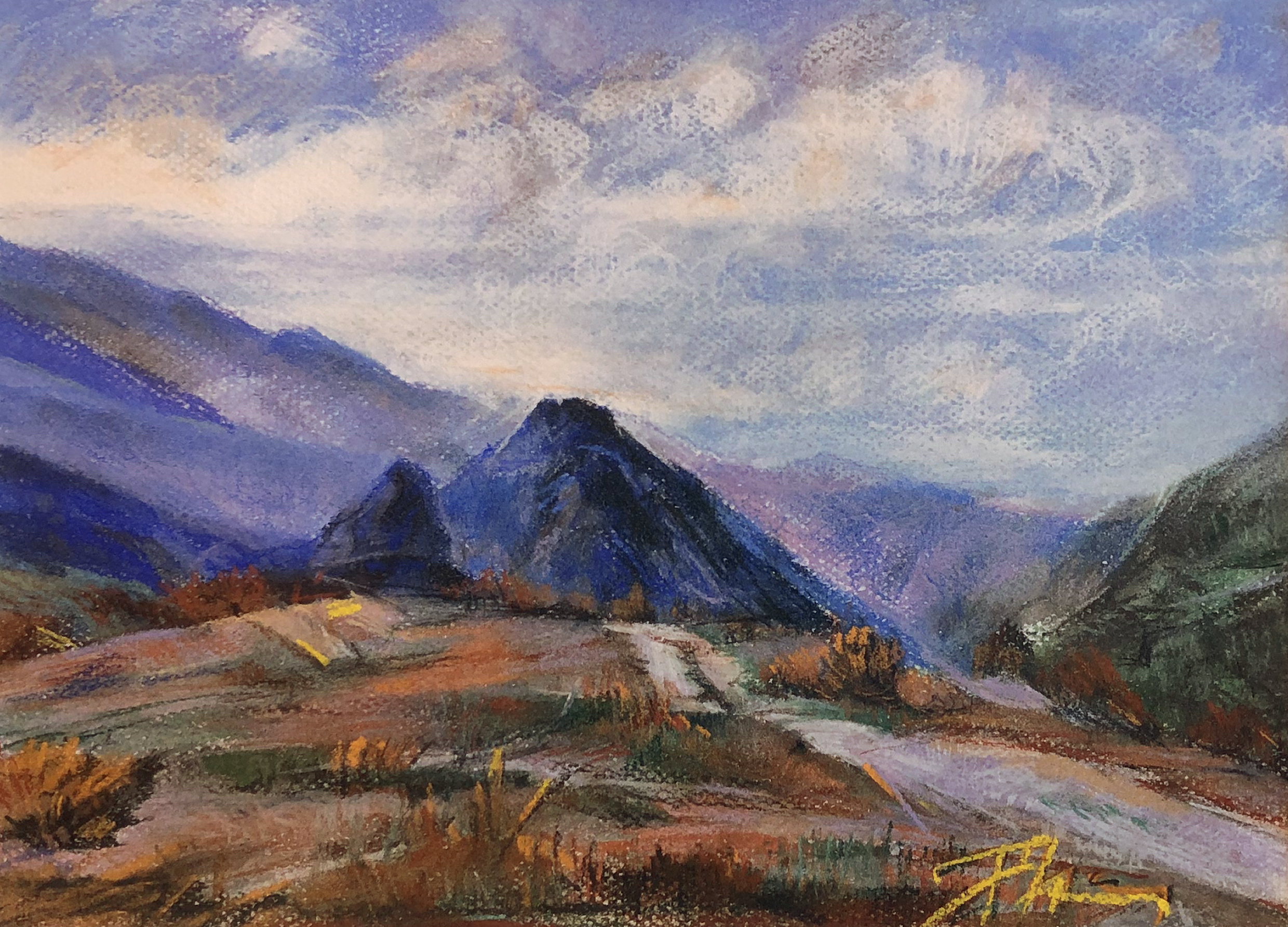
"The Blue Stones", soft pastel, 1999

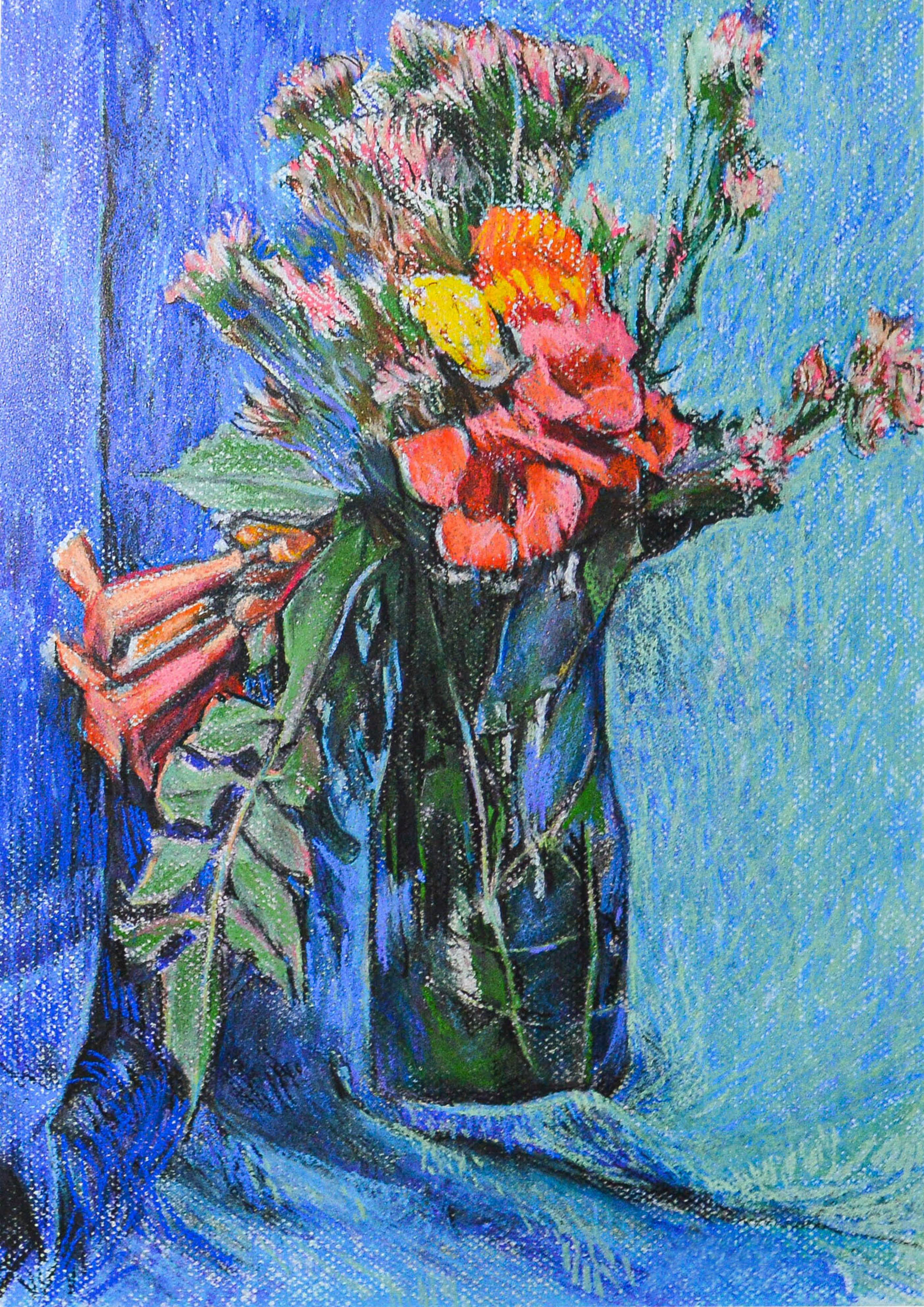
"Sedlarevo Flowers No. 1", soft pastel, 2000

== Archive photos ==
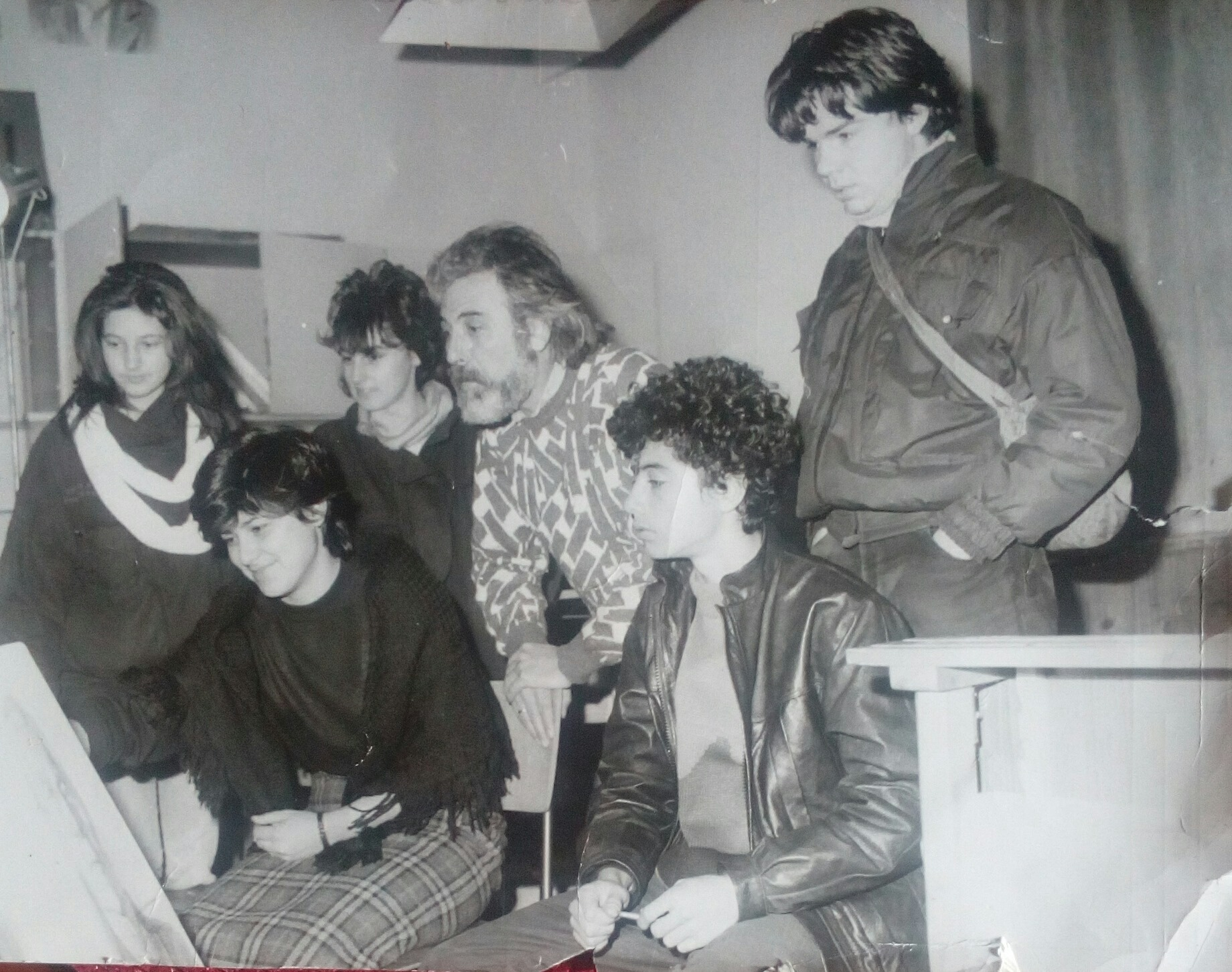
With students, Sliven, 1985

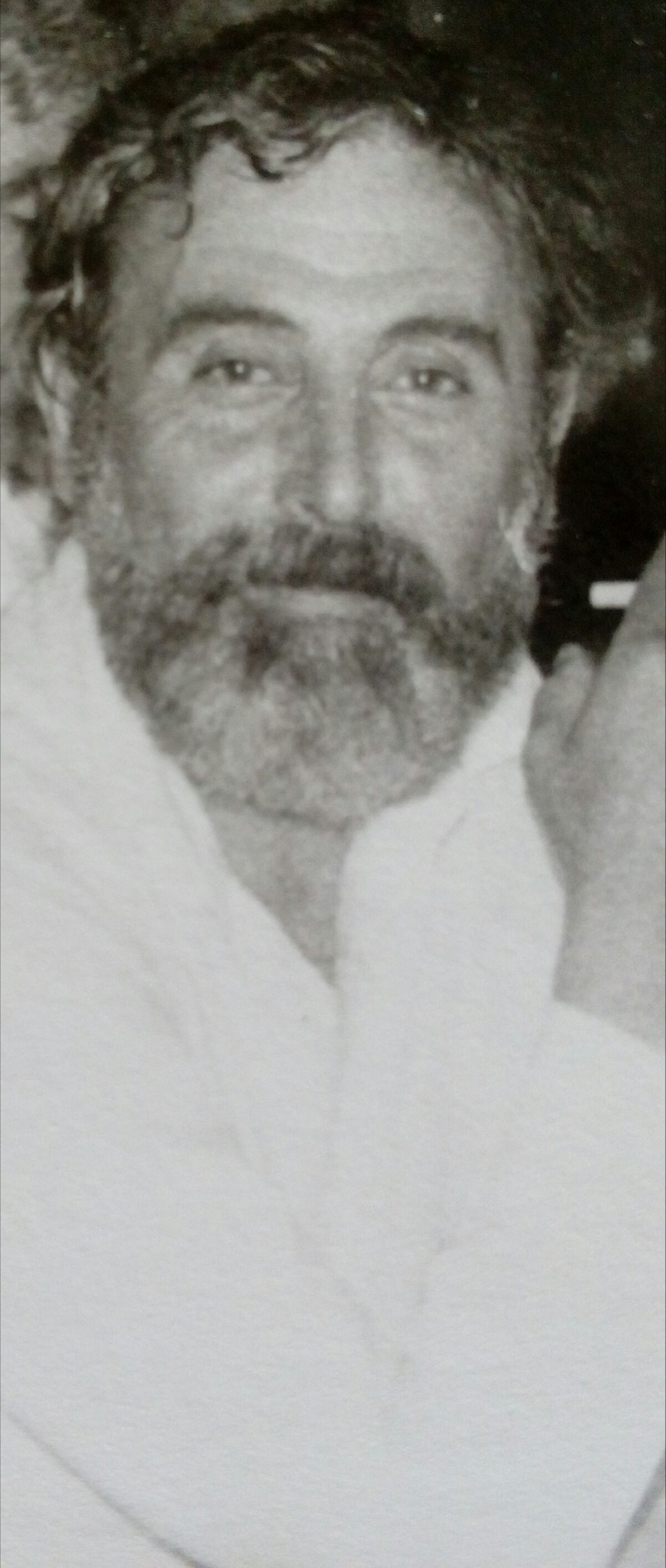
Graduation ball, 1987

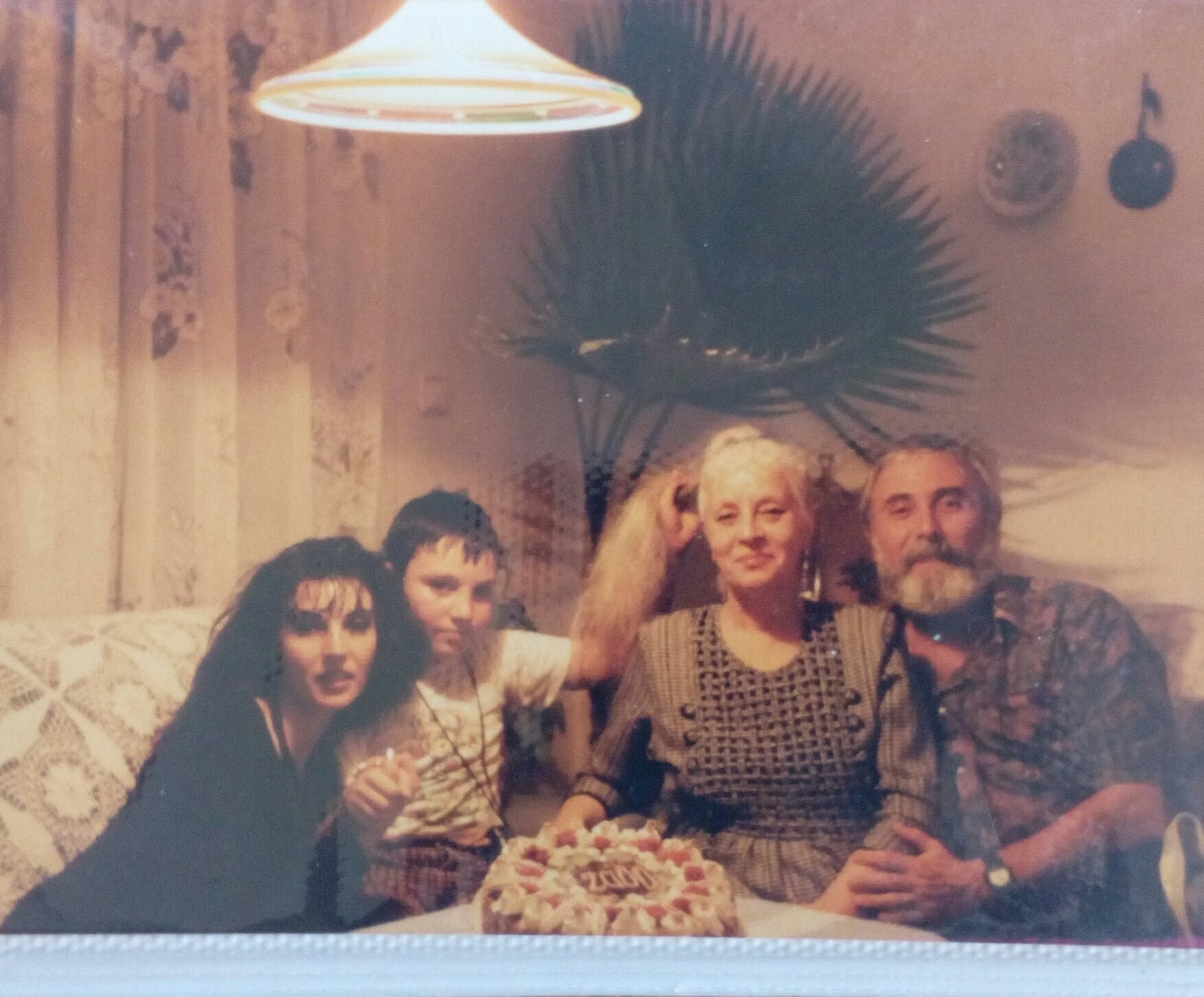
Family Christmas, 1999

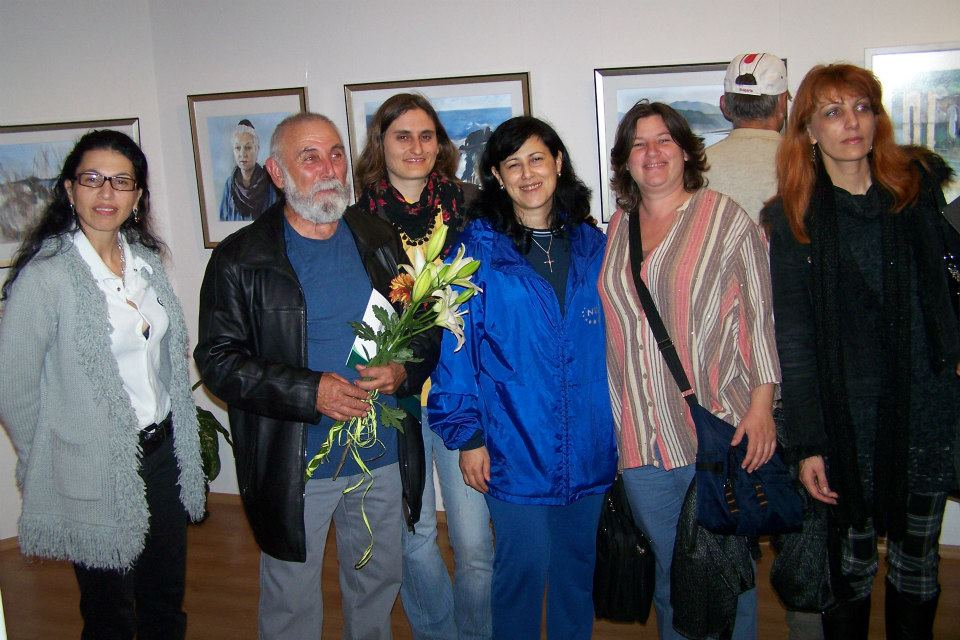
Exhibition, May 2012

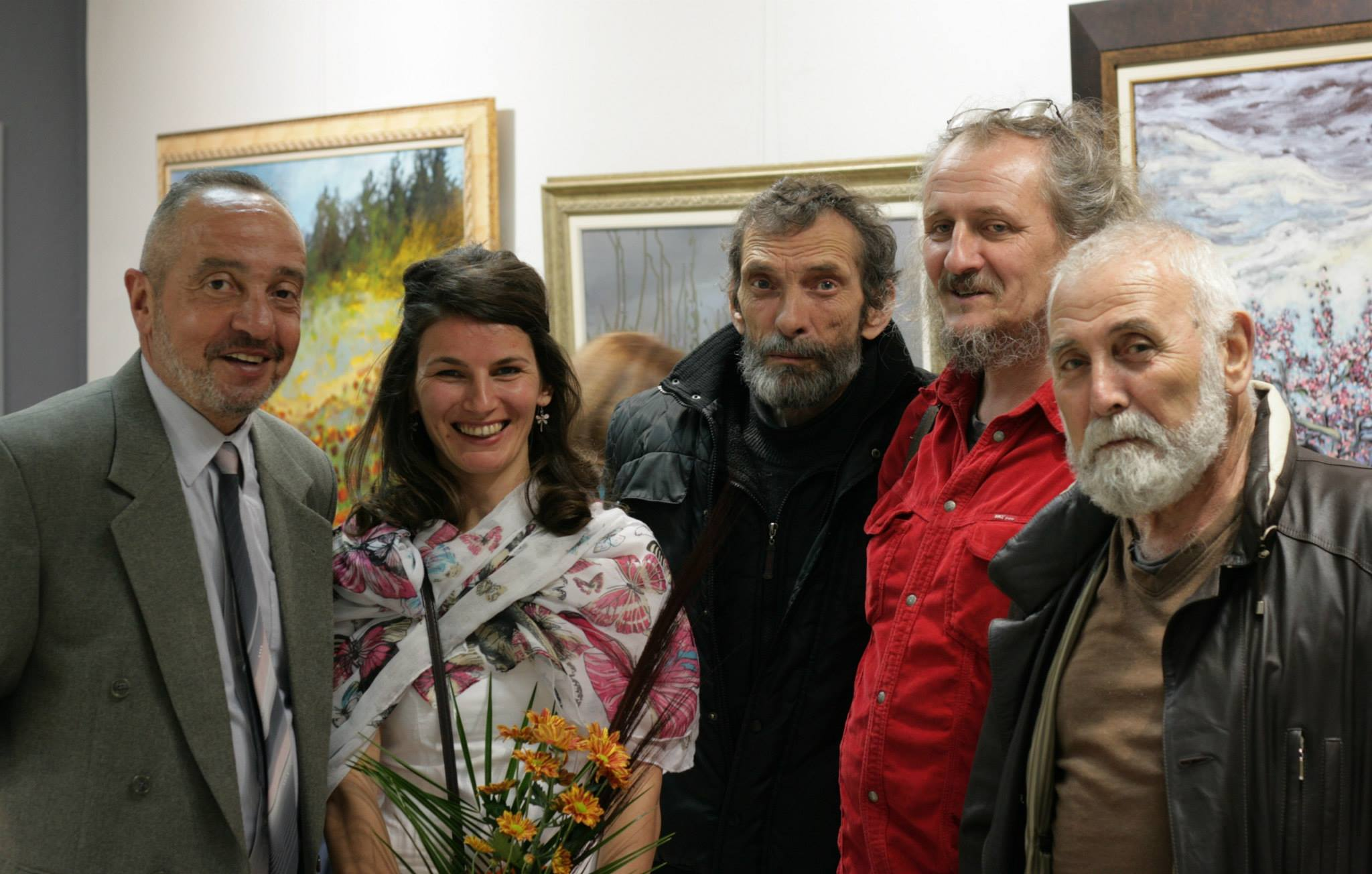
At an exhibition, 2014

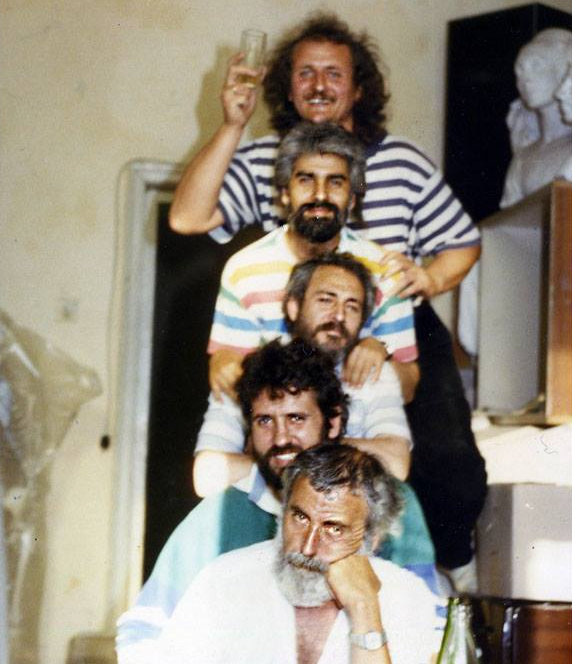
Group photo of Sliven art masters and teachers

== Exhibitions ==
=== Solo exhibitions ===
- 2017 (November) – Final solo exhibition during his lifetime, Gallery "May", Sliven
- 2013 – Solo exhibition, Gallery "May", Sliven
- 2012 – "Soft Pastel" exhibition, Gallery "Bogoridi", Burgas
- 2011 – Solo exhibition, Gallery "May", Sliven

=== Group exhibitions ===
- 2016 (November) – Joint exhibition of the Union of Bulgarian Artists - Sliven Branch, Gallery "May"
- Numerous municipal, district, and collective exhibitions (1971–2016)

== Notable works ==
Among Georgi Yanakiev's known works are:

- "The Dance of the Vines"
- "The Blue Stones" (1999)
- "Sedlarevo Flowers" No. 1 (2000)
- "Sedlarevo Flowers" No. 2
- "Horizon over Sozopol"
- "Evening Mood"
- "Colorful Night" (2017, his final painting)
- "Autumn Landscape"
- "Morning Sea"
- "Spring Motif"
- "Still Life with Roses"
- "The Old Town"
- "Winter Landscape"

== Teaching career ==
Georgi Yanakiev was a longtime teacher of drawing and painting at the National Art School "Dimitar Dobrovich" in Sliven, where he taught alongside his colleague Yordan Parushev. Through his teaching, he influenced generations of young artists, passing on not only technique but also his philosophy of art as a way of life.

Among his students was the graphic artist and illustrator Damyan Damyanov (born 1982), who graduated from the Sliven gymnasium and later became a recipient of numerous national awards in graphic design and illustration.

== Public activity ==
As the chief artist of Sliven Municipality from 1971, Georgi Yanakiev left a lasting mark on the visual appearance of the city. An active member of the Union of Bulgarian Artists - Sliven branch, he participated in numerous cultural initiatives and projects.

His long-standing participation in collective and regional exhibitions established him as an important figure in the cultural life of the region.

== Awards and honors ==
- 1970 – Honorary Award from Chairman of the State Council Todor Zhivkov upon graduating with honors from the National Academy of Art
- 2016 – Honorary Badge from the Mayor of Sliven Municipality for long-standing contribution to the cultural life of the city

== Legacy ==
After his death in 2018, his family has maintained his artistic legacy. More than 250 paintings are preserved in the family collection, representing a valuable part of Sliven's cultural heritage.

His work continues to be displayed in galleries and private collections in Bulgaria and abroad. The website georgijanakiev.wordpress.com documents the artist's life and works.

== See also ==
- Union of Bulgarian Artists
- National Academy of Art
- Evtim Tomov
- Zafir Yonchev
- Petar Chuklev
- Yordan Parushev – colleague teacher at the National Art School "Dimitar Dobrovich"
- Damyan Damyanov – student
- List of Bulgarian painters
