= Dobrović =

Dobrović is a surname of South Slavic origin.

== People with the surname ==
- Juraj Dobrović (born 1928), Croatian artist
- Martin Dobrović (1599–1621), Croatian Catholic priest
- Massimo Dobrovic (born 1984), Istrian Italian actor
- Nikola Dobrović (1897–1967), Serbian architect, teacher and urban planner
- Petar Dobrović (1890–1942), Serbian painter and politician
- Slaven Dobrović (born 1967), Croatian politician

== See also ==
- Dobrovich, Bulgarian surname
- Dobrovice
