= Yordan =

Yordan is a given name and less often a surname. Notable people with the name include:

== Surname ==
- Philip Yordan (1914–2003), American screenwriter

== Given name ==
- Yordan Alvarez (born 1997), Cuban baseball player
- Yordan Angelov (1953–2013), Bulgarian volleyball player
- Yordan Bikov (born 1950), Bulgarian weightlifter
- Yordan Etov (born 1989), Bulgarian football player
- Yordan Frometa, Cuban amateur featherweight boxer
- Yordan Gospodinov (born 1978), Bulgarian football player
- Yordan Hadzhikonstantinov-Dzhinot (1818–1882), Bulgarian teacher, publicist and figure in the Bulgarian National Revival
- Yordan Ilinov (born 1985), Bulgarian sprinter
- Yordan Letchkov (born 1967), Bulgarian footballer, and mayor of Sliven
- Yordan Miliev (born 1987), Bulgarian football player
- Yordan Minev (born 1980), Bulgarian football player
- Yordan Mitkov (born 1956), Bulgarian weightlifter
- Yordan Parushev (1958–2011), Bulgarian artist
- Yordan Petkov (born 1976), Bulgarian football player
- Yordan Piperkata (1870–1903), Macedonian Bulgarian revolutionary, member of IMARO
- Yordan Radichkov (1929–2004), Bulgarian writer and playwright
- Yordan Todorov (footballer, born July 1981), Bulgarian football player
- Yordan Todorov (footballer, born November 1981), Bulgarian football player
- Yordan Todorov (footballer, born 1999), Bulgarian football player
- Yordan Varbanov (born 1980), Bulgarian football player
- Yordan Yanev (born 1954), Bulgarian long jumper
- Yordan Yordanov (disambiguation), various people
- Yordan Yovkov (1880–1937), Bulgarian writer
- Yordan Yurukov (born 1983), Bulgarian football player
