= Rumen (given name) =

Rumen (Bulgarian: Румен) is a Bulgarian masculine given name. Notable people with the name include:

- Rumen Aleksandrov (born 1960), Bulgarian former weightlifter and coach
- Rumen Apostolov (1963–2002), Bulgarian football goalkeeper
- Rumen Dimitrov (born 1982), Bulgarian Sambo practitioner and mixed martial artist
- Rumen Dimitrov (triple jumper) (born 1986), Bulgarian triple jumper
- Rumen Galabov (born 1978), Bulgarian former footballer
- Rumen Gasharov (born 1936), Bulgarian painter
- Rumen Goranov (born 1984), Bulgarian footballer
- Rumen Gyonov (born 1992), Bulgarian footballer
- Rumen Hristov (footballer) (born 1975), Bulgarian retired footballer
- Rumen Hristov (politician) (born 1955), Bulgarian politician
- Rumen Ivanov (1973–2024), Bulgarian footballer
- Rumen Nikolov, Bulgarian sprint canoer who competed in the mid-1990s
- Rumen Nikolov (footballer) (born 1990), Bulgarian footballer
- Rumen Ovtcharov (born 1952), Bulgarian politician, engineer, physicist and economist, former Minister of the Economy and Energy
- Rumen Petkov (artist) (1948–2018), Bulgarian animator, painter and comic creator
- Rumen Petkov (gymnast) (born 1959), Bulgarian gymnast
- Rumen Petkov (politician) (born 1961), Bulgarian politician, former Minister of the Interior
- Rumen Radev (born 1963), former president of Bulgaria
- Rumen Rashev (born 1955), Bulgarian politician
- Rumen Rangelov (born 1985), Bulgarian footballer
- Rumen Sandev (born 1988), Bulgarian footballer
- Rumen Tinkov (born 1987), Bulgarian football goalkeeper
