= Ekaterina Savova-Nenova =

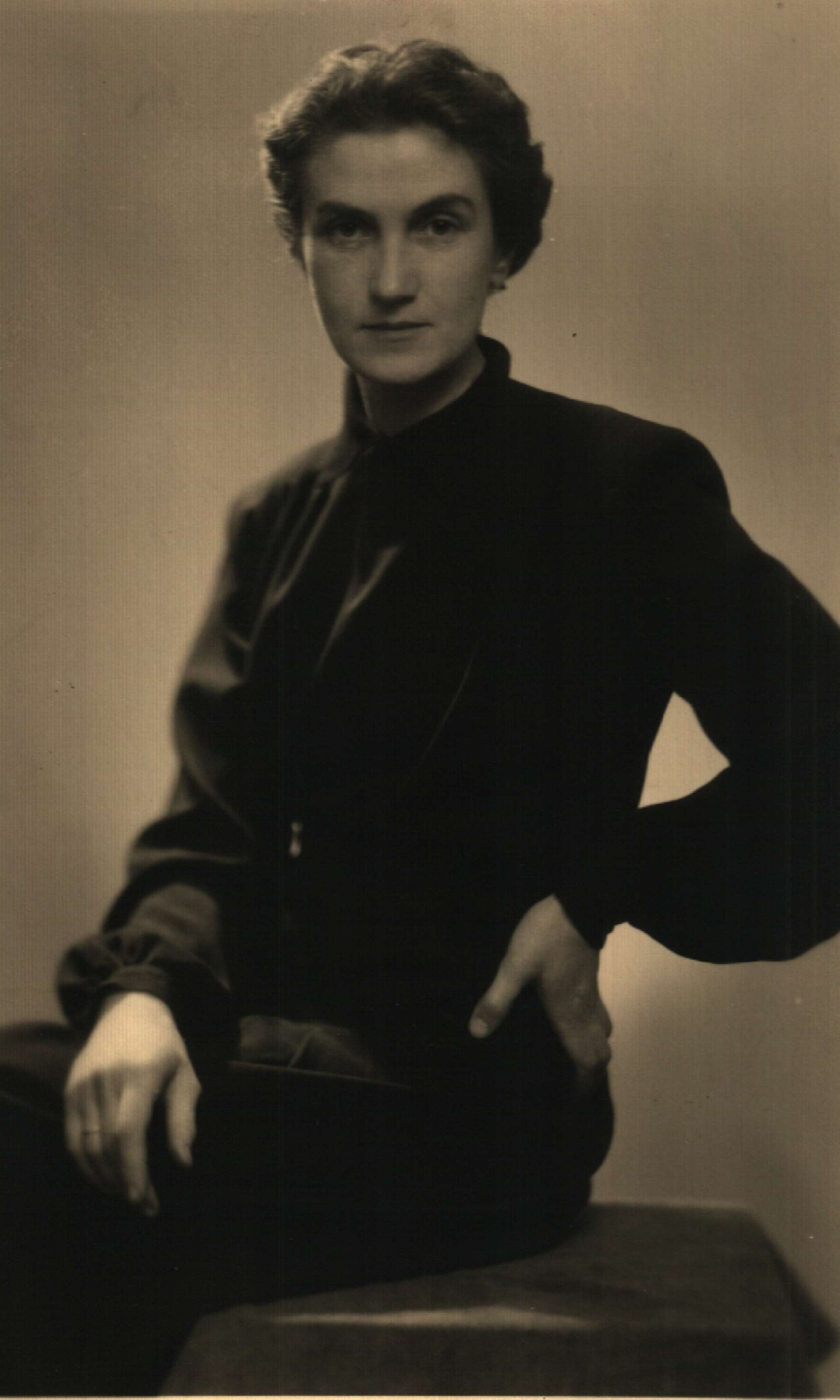
- Born: 1901; Sofia, Bulgaria
- Died: 1980 (aged 78–79)
- Known for: Painting
- Spouse: Ivan Nenov

Ekaterina Savova-Nenova (Bulgarian: Екатерина Савова-Ненова; 1901–1980) was a Bulgarian painter, married to Ivan Nenov, and an art teacher at the Institute for Teachers of Children in Sofia, Bulgaria. She was born November 13, 1901, in Sofia. She studied with Nikola Marinov at the Academy of Arts in Sofia, graduated in 1925, exhibited regularly with the Union of Bulgarian Artists, and had three individual shows in 1943, 1946, and 1958. Her paintings are exhibited in the Philippopolis Art Gallery in Plovdiv and the National Art Gallery in Sofia.
