= Dobrovich =

Dobrovich is a surname. Notable people with the surname include:

- Dimitar Dobrovich (1816–1905), Bulgarian painter and revolutionary
- Joshua Dobrovich (fl. 2025), American politician
