= Stancho Stanchev =

Bulgarian theatre director

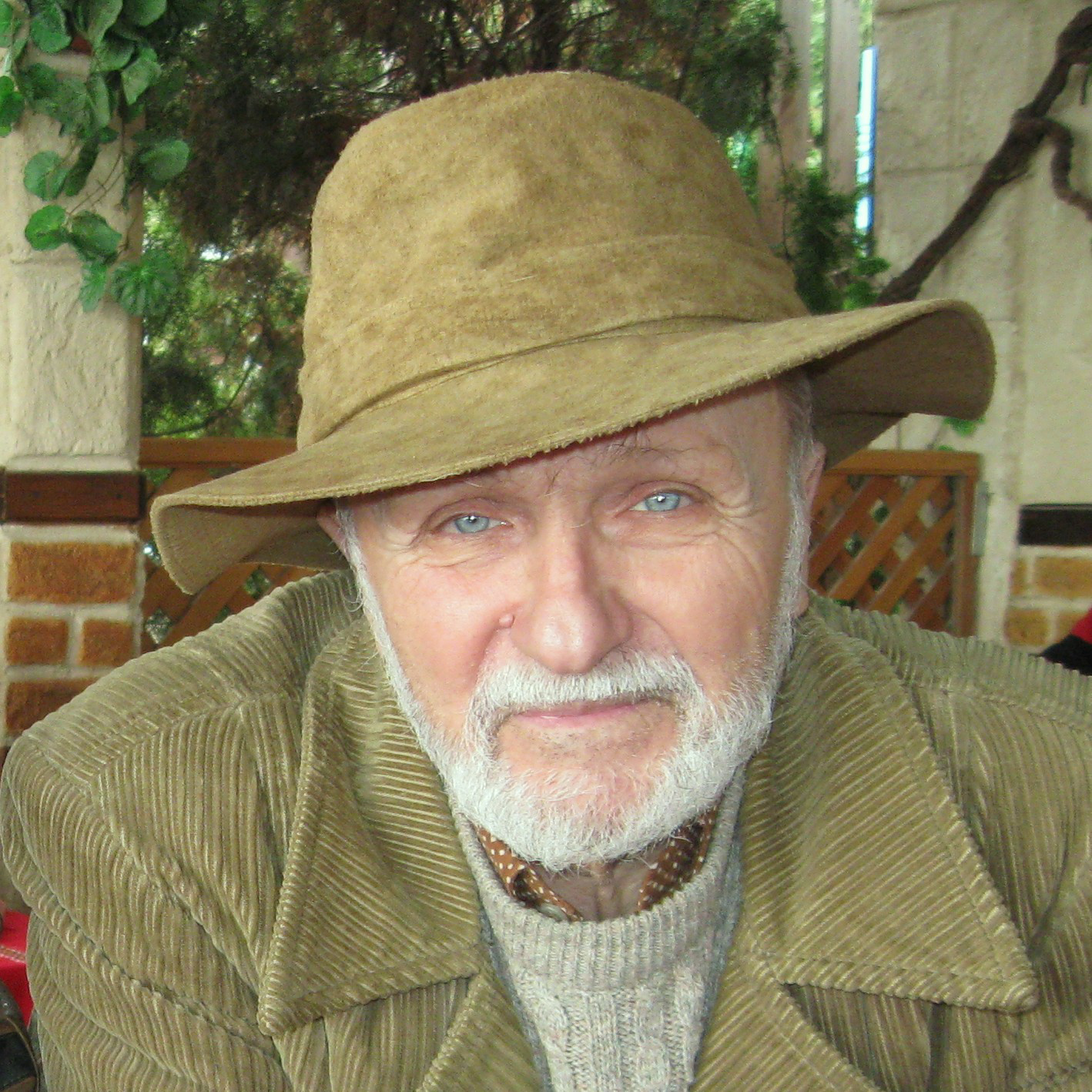
Stancho Stanchev Bulgarian theatre director

Stancho Georgiev Stanchev (Bulgarian Станчо Георгиев Станчев) was a Bulgarian theatre director.

== Biography ==
Stancho Stanchev was born on 5 September 1932 in Plovdiv, Bulgaria. He graduated from the DVTU (Public Higher School of Theater) presently "Krastyo Sarafov" National Academy for Theatre and Film Arts Sofia in 1955, in theatre directing under Prof. Boyan Danovski. He completed a postgraduate degree at the Vakhtangov Theatre under Evgeny Simonov and at the Moscow Satire Theatre under Valentin Pluchek in Moscow.

Stancho Stanchev has staged more than 100 plays by Bulgarian and foreign playwrights on the stages of the drama theatres in Varna, Ruse, Shumen, Sofia, Moscow, Silistra, Pazardzhik. His wife is the artist Daria Vassilyanska. He died on 23 October 2017 in Varna.

== Career ==
- 1955–1959 - theatre director at "Vasil Drumev" Drama Theatre - Shumen
- 1959–1962 - theatre director at "Sava Ognianov" Drama Theatre - Ruse
- 1962–1992 - theatre director, artistic director of "Stoyan Bachvarov" Drama Theatre - Varna

== Performances ==
- The Crucible, Arthur Miller, Drama Theatre, Shumen, 1955–56
- Le Baruffe Chiozzotte /The Chioggia Scuffles/, Carlo Goldoni, Drama Theatre, Shumen, 1956
- Notre-Dame de Paris, Victor Hugo, Drama Theatre, Shumen, 1958
- Buonanotte Patrizia, Aldo De Benedetti, Drama Theatre, Shumen, 1958
- The General and the Mad, Angel Vagenshtain, Drama Theatre, Ruse, 1961
- De Pretore Vincenzo, Eduardo De Filippo, Drama Theatre, Ruse, 1959
- Duel, Ivan Vazov, Drama Theatre Varna, 1962–63
- Around the World in Eighty Days, Pavel Kohout, Drama Theatre, Varna, 1965–66
- The Investigation /Die Ermittlung/, Peter Weiss, Drama Theatre, Varna, 1966–67
- As You Like It, William Shakespeare, Drama Theatre, Varna, 1972–73
- January Yordan Radichkov, Drama Theatre, Varna, 1974–75
- The Roman Bath Stanislav Stratiev, Drama Theatre, Varna, 1974–75
- The Good Soldier Švejk, Jaroslav Hašek, Drama Theatre, Varna, 1975–76
- The Suede Jacket, Stanislav Stratiev, Pushkin Theatre, Moscow, 1977
- The Effect of Gamma Rays on Man-in-the-Moon Marigolds, Paul Zindel, Drama Theatre, Varna, 1978–79
- The Suede Jacket, Stanislav Stratiev, Drama Theatre, Varna, 1978–79
- One Flew Over the Cuckoo's Nest, after Ken Kesey, stage adaptation Dale Wasserman, Drama Theatre, Varna, 1979–80
- Little Comedies, after Anton Chekhov /A Marriage Proposal, On the Harmful Effects of Tobacco, Jubilee, The Swan Song, Drama Theatre, Varna, 1979–80
- Archangels Don't Play Pinball, Dario Fo, Drama Theatre, Varna, 1980–81
- Cyrano de Bergerac, Edmond Rostand, Drama Theatre, Varna, 1981–82
- The Government Inspector, Nikolai Gogol, Drama Theatre, Varna, 1986–87
- All House, Bed and Church, Dario Fo, Drama Theatre, Varna, 1986–87
- The Holy Family, György Schwajda, 1988–89
- The Last Tape /Krapp's Last Tape/, Samuel Beckett, Drama Theatre, Varna, 1991–92
- The Basement, Murray Schisgal, State Puppet Theatre Varna, 1993
- Nora /A Doll's House /, Henrik Ibsen, Art Club Sezam, Varna, 1995
- Miracle, Ivan Radoev, Drama Theatre, Pazardzhik, 1995
- Who's Afraid of Virginia Woolf?, Edward Albee, Drama Theatre, Varna, 1996–97
- L’enseineur ou Une ombre au tableau, Jean-Pierre Dopagne, Drama Theatre, Varna, 2003

== Sources ==
- The Prostori Magazine for Literature and Art
- Encyclopedia of the Bulgarian Theatre
- official site of Drama Theatre Varna
- The Prostori Magazine for Literature and Art, Septembre 2006
- Encyclopedia of the Bulgarian Theatre, ISBN 9545285028, 2005, p. 370, Publishing House Trud, Sofia
- Art Dialog
