= Gencho Nakev =

Bulgarian painter

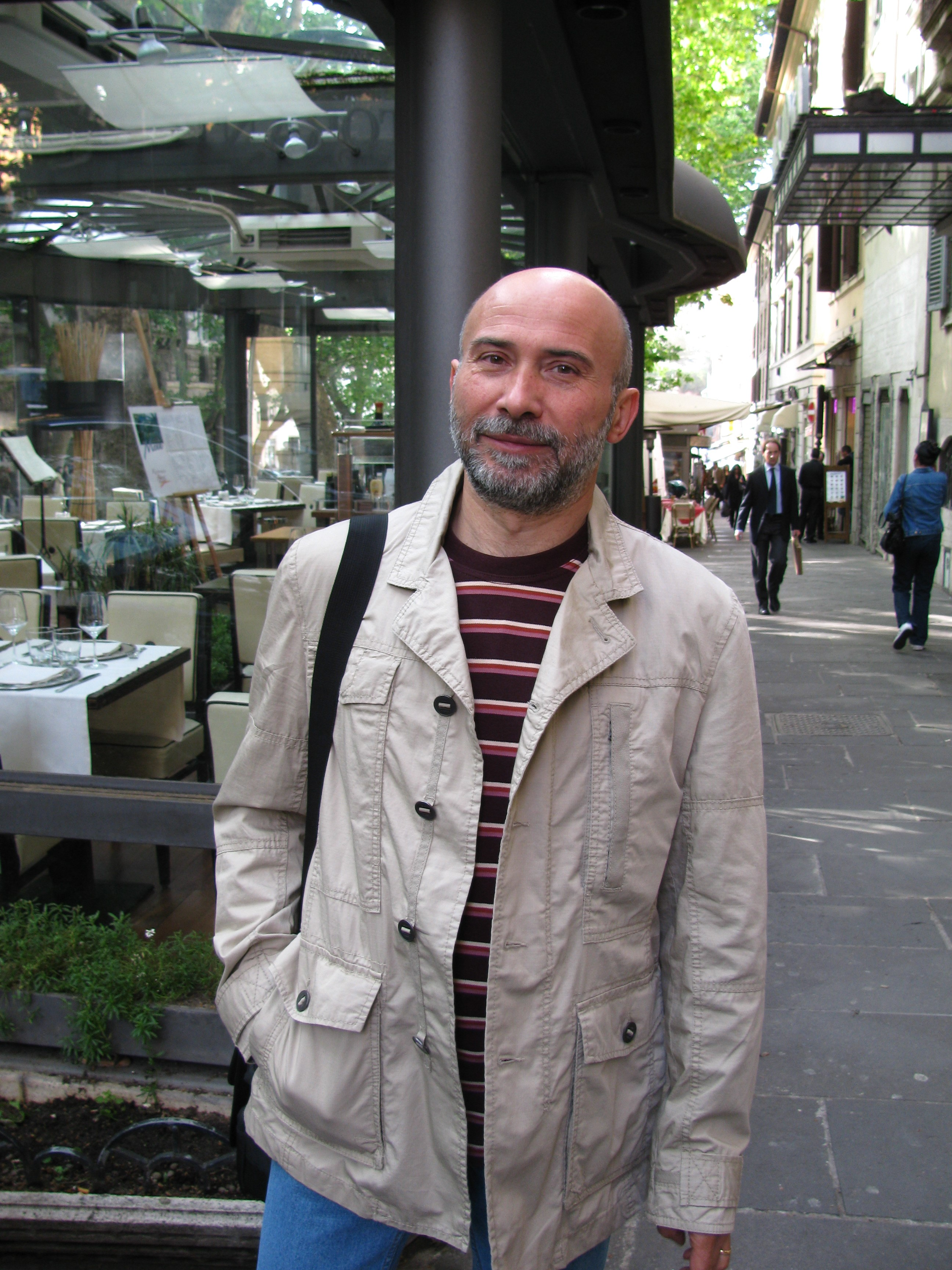
Gencho Nakev - Bulgarian painter

Gencho Nakev, also written as Генчо Накев (born 1962 in Kazanlak, Bulgaria), is a Bulgarian painter.

From 1995 until now teacher of Drawing at the Chair of Drawing and Modelling at the Faculty of Architecture of the University of Architecture, Civil Engineering and Geodesy in Sofia (Bulgaria). Associate Professor since 2011. Member of the Union of Bulgarian Artists since 1992, and through UAB to AIAP of UNESCO. Lives and works in Sofia, Bulgaria.

His artworks are possessed by galleries in Sofia, Pleven, Gabrovo, Vidin, Blagoevgrad and Dobrich (Bulgaria), private collectors in Bulgaria, Germany, France, Czech Republic, Russia, USA, Canada, England and Turkey

== Education ==
1981 – High school education: Specialized Secondary School of Fine Arts in Kazanlak

1987 – Post-Secondary-School education: University of Veliko Tarnovo, Faculty of Fine Arts, Specialty: Painting

== Individual exhibitions ==
- 2015 – Art Gallery « Artamontsev », Sofia
- 2015 – Art Gallery « Aspect », Plovdiv
- 2013 – Municipal Gallery of Pleven
- 2012 – Union of Bulgarian Artists, Art Gallery « Sofia Press » – « Journey » I
- 2012 – Art Gallery « Aspect », Plovdiv – « Journey » II
- 2011 – Art Gallery « Nesi », Burgas
- 2010 – Art Gallery « Artamontsev », Sofia
- 2009 – Art Gallery « Aspect », Plovdiv
- 2008 – Art Gallery « Artamontsev », Sofia
- 2007 – Art Gallery « Aspect », Plovdiv
- 2007 – Art Gallery « Artamontsev », Sofia
- 2006 – Art Gallery « Aspect », Plovdiv
- 2005 – Art Gallery « Artamontsev », Sofia
- 2004 – Art Gallery « Nesi », Burgas
- 2004 – Art Gallery « Artamontsev », Sofia
- 2003 – Art Gallery « Artamontsev », Sofia
- 2001 – Art Gallery « Cyclopes », Sofia
- 1999 – Month of the European Culture, Sts Constantin and Helena Church, Plovdiv, the Old Town, presented by Art Gallery « Solers »
- 1998 – Art Gallery « Navilart », Varna
- 1993 – Municipal Gallery of Pleven
- 1993 – « Gallery 13 », Pleven
- 1991 – « Rom – Art Gallery » – Braunschweig, Germany
- 1990 – Municipal Gallery of Pleven
- 1990 – Gallery of the Union of Bulgarian Artists, 6 Shipka Street, Sofia
- 1990 – Municipal Gallery of Sliven

== Major groups’ exhibitions and forums ==
- 2009 – Exhibition « Layers » – the Art Gallery of the State Institute of Culture at the Ministry of Foreign Affairs « Mission » and the Gallery « Artamontsev » present Bulgarian artists at the Permanent Representation of Bulgaria to the EU in Brussels
- 2006 – International Plein Air – Caorle (Italy)
- 2004 – « Ohlyuv Art » (Snail Art) – project of Art Gallery « Artamontsev » and Mrs. Isabelle Sol Dourdin, under the patronage of the spouse of the President of the Republic of Bulgaria, Mrs. Zorka Parvanova, Programme for development of the ONU
- 2004 – V Graphic Art Workshop, Plovdiv
- 2002 – Exhibition “Small format”, Pleven
- 1999 – Art Fair – Francfort, Germany, presented by Galerie in der Prannerstrasse (Munich)
- 1997 – Exhibition « Мiniature », Lebanon
- 1997 – Exhibition « Krida Art », Sofia
- 1996 – « Rom – Art Galerie », Braunschweig, Germany
- 1995 – « Rom – Art Gallerie », Braunschweig, Germany
- 1994 – Union of the Bulgarian Artists, Art Gallery « Sofia Press » presents Bulgarian artistes in Liège, Belgium
- 1993 – « Salon d’automne », Paris, France
- 1992 – Exhibition of « Art Club » – Union of the Bulgarian Artists, Gallery 6 Shipka str., Sofia
- 1992 – Exhibition « Eroticism », Pleven
- 1992 – « Eroticism » Happening, Pleven
- 1991 – Exhibition of « Art Club » in « Rom – Art Galerie » – Braunschweig, Germany
- 1991 – Kunstforum – Länderbank, Vienne, Austria – charity auction – presented by the Gallery of the Union of the Bulgarian Artists “Sofia Press”
- 1991 – Exhibition of « Art Club », Cottbus, Germany
- 1990 – “The Ship” – installation/happening, forecourt of the Palace of Culture – Sofia
- 1990 – International Plein Air “Etara”, Gabrovo
- 1990 – Group Exhibition “5 + 2”, Gabrovo
- 1990 – Group Exhibition “ART”, Pleven
- 1990 – Exhibition “7 + 2”, Pleven
- 1990 – Exhibition of the Artists of Pleven in the town of Sliven
- 1989 – Exhibition “Experiment”, Pleven – collective exhibition of artistes and photographers
- 1989 – “Awakening”, Pleven – installation/happening Gencho Nakev and Lyuben Kostov
