= Violeta Maslarova =

Bulgarian artist (1925–2006)

- Виолета Христова Масларова
- Born: 1925; Burgas, Bulgaria
- Died: 2006 (aged 80–81)
- Education: National Academy of Art
- Known for: painting

Violeta Christova Maslarova (Bulgarian: Виолета Христова Масларова; 1925–2006) was a Bulgarian artist known for her romantic and moody seascapes. Along with Georgi Baev and Kiril Simeonov she was often referred to as one of the 'Bourgas Colourists'. Her career spanned both the communist and the capitalist era of Bulgaria with mixed effects on her art and career.

Maslaraova (née Buchvarova) was born to a poor family in Burgas, Bulgaria. Her father, Christo Buchvarov was a builder who succumbed at a relatively young age to severe Parkinson's disease, brought on according to family tradition by business failure caused by his partner's embezzlement, which left him a partial invalid. Zhetchka, her mother, kept the family by selling flower pots and cultivating vegetables.

Maslaraova showed and early aptitude for drawing. This was encouraged by her teachers and her mother. She was admitted to the art academy in National Academy of Art in Sofia in 1944, where she studied under Professor Detchko Ouzounov, himself a friend of Jules Pascin, with whom he had studied painting in Berlin.

Following graduation Violeta married the lawyer Dimiter Nikolov Maslarov. Her paintings were very well received and she was admitted to the Union of Bulgarian Artists. Under the communist regime this was an important step for any artist. Membership gave automatic admission to many regional and national exhibitions, invitations to plein-air workshops, the possibility of state commissions and the likelihood of purchases by state bodies and dependent organisations. Violeta was also included in 'fraternal delegations' to Czechoslovakia, Roumania and the USSR.

Although 'Socialist Realism' was the official approach to the visual arts in Bulgaria artists still found ways of subverting the official line. Such expedients as painting factories using a cubist grid or painting workers' demonstrations using a heightened palette were common. Maslarova's response was to move towards seascapes and flowers paintings. The seascapes often included the local fishermen with their boats and nets, an officially 'appropriate' subject, but within a landscape that tended towards a minimal abstraction. Besides receiving official approval these were also popular among the cultural community, bringing her the respect both of the public and her peers. In 1966 she was awarded the Order of Cyril and Methodius for her services to the arts.

As the communist regime drew to a close Maslarova, now a widow, found conditions in Bulgaria to be increasingly difficult and in 1988 moved to the UK. Despite steady sales of her paintings and a solo show the Charlotte Lampard gallery in London she was unable to settle and, following the fall of the Zhivkov regime, returned to Bulgaria in 1992, where she lived until her death in 2006.

Her later years in Bulgaria produced mixed results artistically. With state support severely curtailed there was increased pressure to produce and sell work. The absence of her husband, one of her best critics, and the need to sell more work meant that she had to work more conscientiously than before but that the paintings became more variable in quality. Despite this she was named as the 'Artist of the Year' in 1999 and elected a freeman of the city of her native Bourgas in 2000. Her best work remained her seascapes, with their tender palette of muted blues, violets and purples. Despite their simple composition they were, in fact, heavily worked going through many variations before arriving at their finished state. Surprisingly for someone trained in a classical discipline, her later portraits do little to enhance her reputation, which must depend upon her seascapes and some of her later flower paintings.
