= Alexander Telalim =

Telalim Alexander
- Born: 18 April 1966 (age 60); Vladychen, Bolhrad Raion, Odesa Oblast, Ukrainian SSR
- Known for: Painting, watercolor and calligraphy

Alexander Telalim (born 1966) is a Ukrainian and Bulgarian visual artist. He graduated from the Grekov Odesa Art School in Odesa, Ukraine, and then from the National Academy of Arts in Sofia, Bulgaria. He lives and works in Sofia.

Telalim is one of the Bulgarian artists working predominantly in watercolour. He combines the natural fluidity of watercolour with the power of sharp lines, creating amazingly vivid and emotional works. His paintings harmonize visions of childhood with his philosophy. The conciseness of his medium highlights the depth and expressiveness of his watercolours in the heritage of Zen philosophy. He also works as a calligrapher and book illustrator.

He is a member of the Union of Bulgarian Artists and has had more than 60 solo exhibitions in Europe, the USA and Japan.

Telalim's artworks can be found in numerous private collections in Europe and the US, as well as in public collections of the City Gallery of Izmail (Ukraine), the municipality of Saint Louis (France), the Bulgarian Consulate in New York City (US), the municipality of Weimar (Germany) and the Ukrainian Consulate in Sofia (Bulgaria).

== Career ==
- 2002: International ceramic workshop, Troyan, Bulgaria
- 2003: Mural "The Magic Theater", The National Academy of Theater and Film, Sofia
- 2004: International watercolor workshop, Nova Zagora, Bulgaria
- 2004-07: Design line for the FPI hotels, Sofia and Varna, Bulgaria
- 2009: "Watercolor Dreamscapes" workshop, Illinois Institute of Art-Chicago, IL

== Selected group exhibitions ==
- 1983-95: Group shows in Izmail and Odesa, Ukraine
- 1997: National exhibition "Bulgaria — Drawing '97", Sofia, Bulgaria
- 1999: National exhibition "Bulgaria — Drawing '99", Sofia, Bulgaria
- 2000: "Spiritual Messages", Vitosha Gallery, Sofia, Bulgaria
- 2002: "Sails" (installation with Valia Telalim), "Sea of Forms" Art Festival, Golden Sands, Varna, Bulgaria
- 2004: Around the Coyote Art Festival, Chicago, USA

"Far From Yesterday: New Bulgarian Art" — TZ Gallery, Chicago, USA

- 2007: "Trace of Water", Bulgarian Consulate in New York, (Bulgarian Days Festival), New York
- 2009: "Belle Mistique", Gallerie MK, River Nord Art District, Chicago

"Faces Without Translation", Noe Art Gallery, Sofia, Bulgaria

- 2010: "The Light of the Winter Star" (with Vassilen Vasevski), Ukrainian National Museum, Chicago, USA
- 2011: "The First Flight" exhibition by contemporary Bulgarian artists, Sofia Gallery, London

"Traditions and Inspirations from the East" - calligraphy of A. Telalim, bonsai and ikebana, Mission Gallery of the Ministry of Foreign Affairs in Sofia.

- 2013 "Summer Fusion", Collection Red showcases the talents of artists from the former Soviet Union, Kensington, London

== Selected solo exhibitions ==
- 1997: "Water Reflections", City Art Gallery, Izmail, Ukraine

"Message from the East", "Cristina de Vicente" Gallery, Huelva, Spain
"Valentina" Ukrainian Art Club, Sofia, Bulgaria

- 1999: Gavrilova Gallery, Saint-Louis/Basil, France

"The Sky", Santa Clara Monastery, Moguer, Spain
"The Way of the Wind", "Festinvest" Exhibition Hall, Sofia, Bulgaria
Garduno Gallery, Sevilla, Spain; City Gallery, Masagon, Spain

- 2000: "Bridges" — "Bulgaria — Slavonic World" Museum, Sofia, Bulgaria

City Art Gallery, Lodz, Poland

- 2001: "Message from the West" — Sachie Ikeda Gallery, Kagava, Japan

"Ludwig Beier" Exhibition Hall, Stara Zagora, Bulgaria

- 2002: "Gift for Lovers — 14.02", Galeros Gallery, Sofia, Bulgaria

"Watercolor from Bulgaria", Olivian Gallery, Kagava, Japan
"Fishing at Night", Contemporary Art Center, Varna, Bulgaria

- 2006: "Balkanica" Cultural and Art Center, Sofia, Bulgaria

"Yellow and Blue" (Ukrainian Days in Macedonia), National Art Gallery, Skopje, Macedonia

- 2007: "Awake and Dreaming" — Grita Gallery, Sofia, Bulgaria

"Aqua Incognita", Girafe Gallery, Berlin, Germany
"Aqua Incognita", Literaturehause Gallery, Weimar, Germany
"New Mithology", Noe Gallery, Sofia

- 2008: "The Flowers", Papillon Gallery, Varna, Bulgaria

"Aquarelle", Girafe Gallery, Brussels, Belgium
"Edem: At Home, Towards the Inner Self", Lik Gallery, Sofia, Bulgaria
"Dreams on the Roof", Sofia Philharmonics Gallery, Sofia, Bulgaria

- 2009: "Watercolors", Ukrainian National Museum, Chicago, USA

"The Home", Papillon Gallery, Varna, Bulgaria

- 2010: "Morning in the Promised Land", Rosh Pinna, Israel
- 2015: Masters of Watercolor - Exhibition participants' catalogue, Saint Petersburg, 20–31 January 2015
