= Dimitre Mehandjiysky =

Bulgarian artist (1915–1999)

Dimitre Manassiev Mehandjiysky (Bulgarian: Димитър Манасиев Механджийски; 8 October 1915 – 17 October 1999), was a Bulgarian painter and designer. He is considered one of the pillars of the 20th century Bulgarian environmental (interior, exterior and furniture) design. In addition, he is known as a masterful watercolor painter. Mehandjiyski is awarded with over 20 state honors, in recognition for his talent and achievement. In addition, his name was added to the prestigious Bulgarian Encyclopaedia of Design and Applied Art (Енциклопедия на Българските Приложни Изкуства, Том 2: М-Я).

Dimitre Mehandjiysky was born in Bosilegrad, a city with a mostly Bulgarian population that subsequently became a Serbian territory, since Bulgaria was on the losing side in World War I. After his parents' untimely death, Mehandjiysky became the guardian of his young siblings. Together, they migrated to Sofia, where Mehandjiysky struggled for years to support his family and to obtain a decent education. Ultimately, he became a student at the National Art Academy in Sofia, where he studied under Prof. Dechko Uzunov, majoring in Monumental Art. He graduated soon after the end of World War II, in 1946.

== First period ==
In the following years, Mehandjiysky gradually established himself as an influential artist/designer. He was commissioned to design furniture and home accessories, and to work on multiple museums, exhibits, store interiors, and art galleries, international expos and fairs — in Bulgaria, USSR, Czechoslovakia, Poland, Italy, France, Cuba, U.S., Canada, Japan, Denmark, Austria, and many other countries.

The paintings Dimitre Mehandjiysky worked on in this period are numerous, but remain less known than his applied art and interior design creations. Primarily, Mehandjiysky's paintings are watercolor landscapes and traditional architecture scenes form the Bulgarian towns of Balchik, Sozopol, Nesebar, Koprivshtica, Karlovo, Plovdiv, and the area around Sofia. His first solo exhibition opened on 13 November, 1986.

== Second period ==
In the later years of his creative career, Dimitre Mehandjiysky lived in between Sofia, Bulgaria and Osaka, Japan. He worked predominantly on paintings in watercolor and gouache (tempera). He developed a new watercolor technique that surprised everyone who knew the artist in the past: the pragmatic, purist, minimalistic designer thinking was replaced with an emotional, irrational, semi-abstract, kinetic, dynamic, sometimes lyrical and transparent- and sometimes dark, dramatic and turbulent- application of marker & watercolor over special textured paper. Mehandjiysky got inspired by diverse subjects: traditional architecture and nature of Japan; a large variety of fresh flowers and still-life, etc. In addition, he worked on series of nudes- sensual, spontaneous paintings with elegant, subdued eroticism that ultimately became extremely popular with private art collectors in Japan and other countries.

== Epilogue ==
In spite of old age, the artist led an active life and remained remarkably productive until his last breath; he died in 1999 during a trip to Pasadena, California, and was buried at the Forest Lawn cemetery in Glendale.
