= Nikola Marinov =

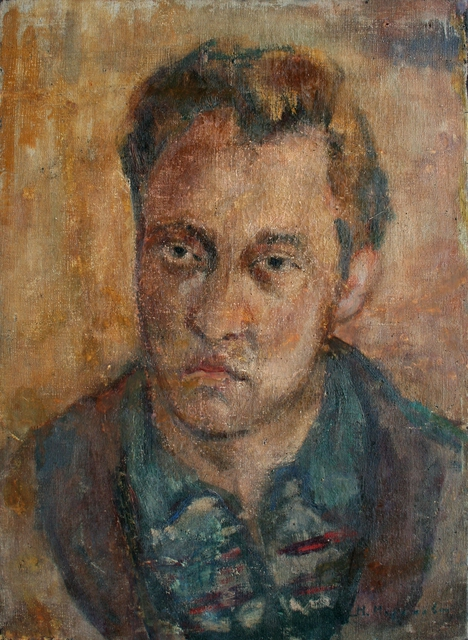
- Nikola Marinov, Self-portrait
- Born: 10 July 1879; Targovishte, Bulgaria
- Died: 16 December 1948; Sofia, Bulgaria
- Known for: Painter

Nikola Marinov Abadzhiev (Bulgarian: Никола Маринов Абаджиев) was a Bulgarian painter and teacher.

Marinov was born in the town of Targovishte in 1879. His interest in painting began in the high school. After that he continued his education at the Albertina Academy of Fine Arts in Turin, Italy, where his teachers included Andrea Tavernier and Giacomo Grosso. He graduated in 1903 and stayed to paint in Italy for two more years.

After returning to Bulgaria in 1906, he worked as a teacher in Sofia until 1919, and then with the Ministry of Education and Science (1919–1921). Between 1921 and 1940 he was a professor in the National Academy of Art, Sofia where he served as Chancellor in the period 1935–1937. Among his students were eminent Bulgarian artists such as Ilia Beshkov and Ivan Nenov.

He worked mostly in the art of painting as he had preference for water-color. Marinov has also done a great number of frescoes in churches in Plovdiv, Lovech, Biala Cherkva, Pernik and Alexander Nevsky Cathedral in Sofia.

The town art gallery in Targovishte is named after him in his honour and many of his works are exhibited there. As well there is a high school in the town named Nikola Marinov.

== Works ==
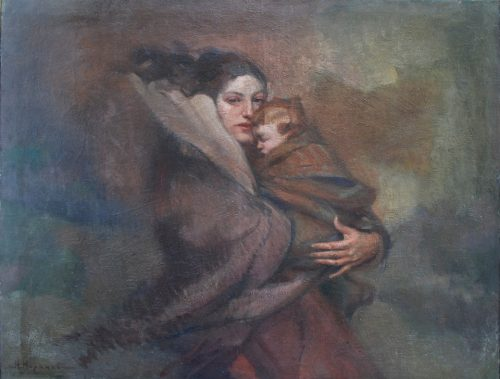
"Again in life"

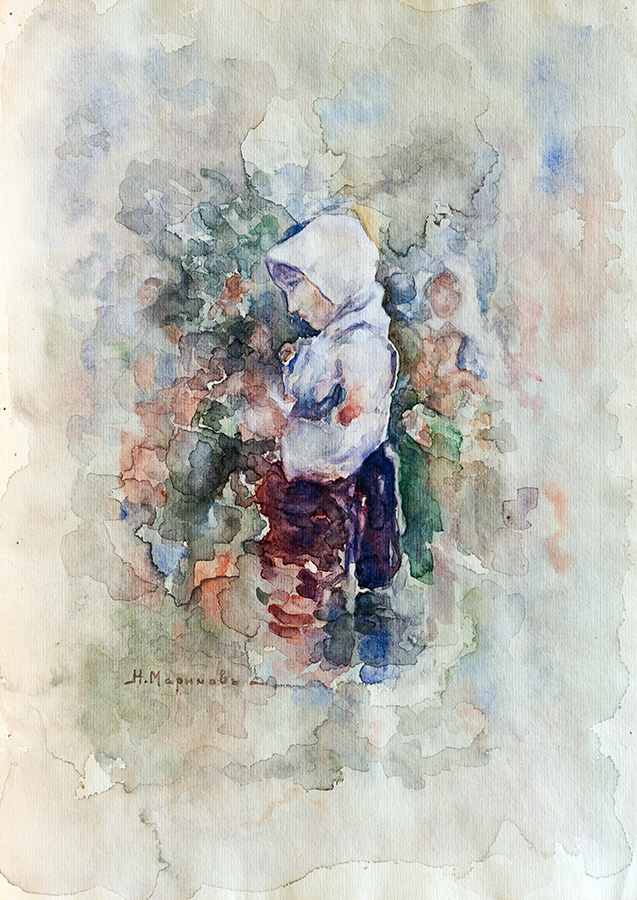
"Rose picking"

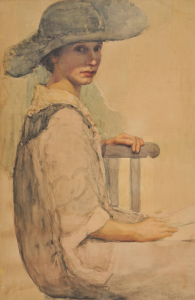
Portrait of the painter's wife Frederica

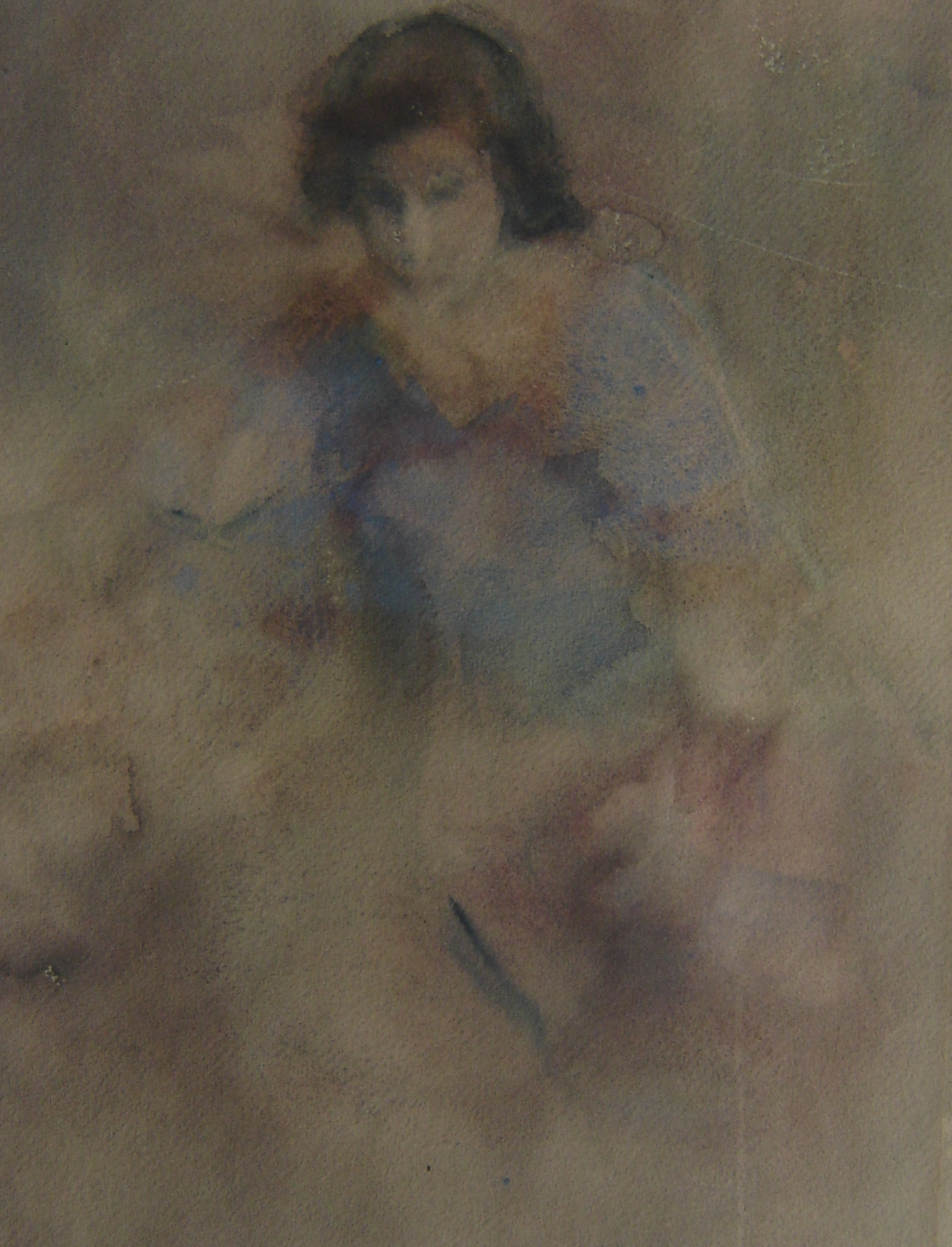
Daydreaming
