= Yordan Yordanov =

Yordan Yordanov may refer to:

- Yordan Yordanov (footballer, born 1951), Bulgarian footballer
- Yordan Yordanov (canoeist) (born 1981), Bulgarian sprint canoer
- Yordan Yordanov (footballer, born 1992), Bulgarian footballer
