= Radi Nedelchev =

Bulgarian artist (1938–2022)

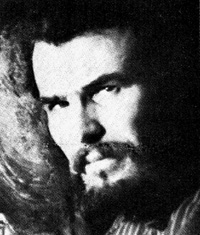
Radi Nedelchev

Radi Nedelchev (Bulgarian: Ради Неделчев; April 1, 1938 – April 4, 2022) was a Bulgarian artist best known as a painter of naïve art. His paintings depict mostly landscapes, village life and festivals.

Radi Nedelchev was a member of the Union of Bulgarian Artists and also held The Order of Cyril and Methodius 1st class – the highest prize for art and culture in Bulgaria.
