= Anastas Konstantinov =

Anastas Konstantinov (Bulgarian: Анастас Константинов) (March 29,1956 - June 01, 2017) is a well known artist who was celebrated for his mystic expressionism, although his work is diverse.

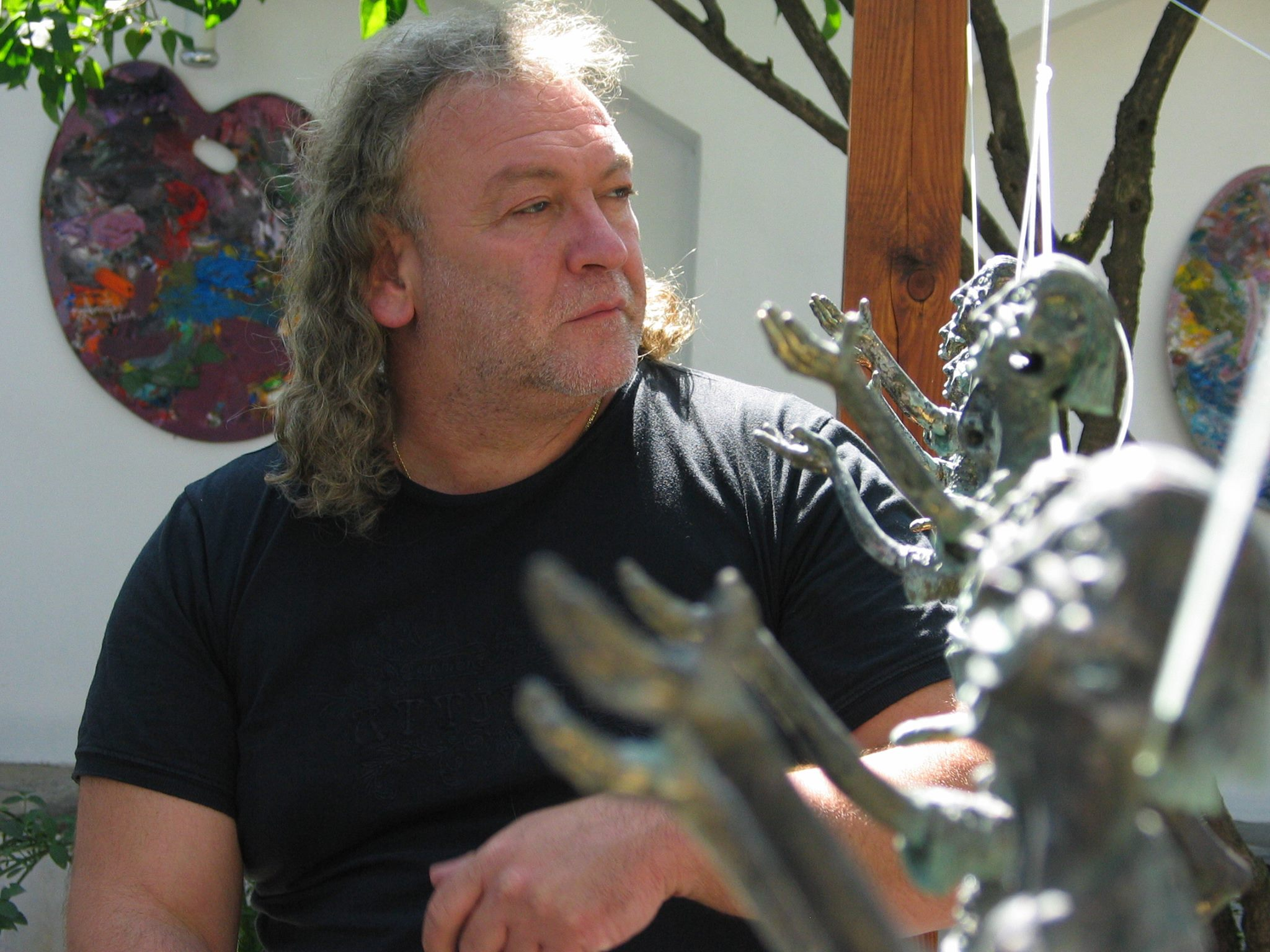
Anastas Konstantinov in his studio garden in Plovdiv, Bulgaria.

Konstantinov finished his preliminary art training at the Secondary Art School in Kazanlak, Bulgaria in 1976 and continued his training at the Veliko Tarnovo University until he graduated in 1982 with a master's degree in fine arts. While he was there, Anastas' paintings got near neo-expressionism and became conflict-driven due to his disgust with the Bulgarian Communist Party and communism as a whole. One critic from the Pittsburgh Post-Gazette remarked that those paintings were "violent, nihilistic, ominous, even grotesque." In 1986, one of Konstantinov's exhibitions was shut down by the Bulgarian Communist Party for displaying subversive paintings. He continued to fight communism and to portray the dark reality of the time. Despite threats from the authorities, he responded to his exhibition being shut down by painting the series, "The Red Pigs," which was laden with even greater themes of discontent. Prof. Dr. Hans Theodor Flemming asserted at an exhibition of Contemporary Bulgarian Art in Hamburg at that time that Anastas' paintings were "apocalyptic" and that they took place "in surreal areas, in which people and animals appear in sinister alienation and decay, thus setting various iconographic riddles."

After the end of the Cold War, Konstantinov's paintings became less conflict-driven and began to focus more on the spiritual. As the art critic Bisera Yosifova reported for a Plovdiv newspaper Plovdivski novini, "the angry young man from the eighties has revealed for the first time the sacral spaces of the love mystery. He has realized that a lie cannot be deadened with violence, but only with love." Due to the sale of some large paintings, Anastas was able to begin the construction of his project "Gallery Anastas" in an old part of Plovdiv, Bulgaria. Archeologists supervised the construction in order to preserve the Neolithic, Thracian, Roman, and Medieval remnants of the location. The gallery, called Gallery Anastas, opened in 1999 alongside 90 completed works.

In 2011, Michelangelo Celli, an American art collector, visited Anastas' personal gallery in Bulgaria and was "blown away" and "deeply moved" by his work. Mr. Celli urged Anastas to travel to the United States to paint and gain publicity. He agreed and stayed with Mr. Celli in Pittsburgh for three months. His visit resulted in the creation of the US Project, an initiative which is "committed to promoting awareness for the work of Bulgarian artist Anastas Konstantinov in the United States."

In 2013, as part of the US Project, Anastas Konstantinov was selected by the Starry Night Exposure Program to participate in art fairs during 2013 Art Basel and 2014 Frieze New York. In 2013, Christian Noorbergen included Anastas in his Carte Blanche Exhibition at the Galerie Schwab in Beaubourg, France.

One unintended result of the US Project was that Anastas' artistic reputation in Bulgaria grew. He was asked to appear on Darik Radio Radio Bulgaria and numerous other media sources reported on his whereabouts. As a result of Anastas' 33 years of professional work he was asked to present over eighty of his paintings and sculptures in Plovdiv, Bulgaria at the City Gallery of Fine Arts in July 2014. This exhibition marked the first time in 25 years the artist presented at a major solo exhibition in Plovdiv.
