= Yordan Parushev =

Yordan Parushev (Bulgarian: Йордан Парушев) (30 June 1958 in Sliven, Bulgaria – 15 December 2011), was a contemporary Bulgarian artist. Graduated in Painting Department /Veliko Tarnovo University /, with the main subject - painting class Pamukchiev Stanislav's, 1983. He has specialized in the Repin Academy in St. Petersburg, Russia and the Cite Internationale Arts in Paris, France. Associate professor of art history and art of Veliko Tarnovo University "St." St. Cyril and Methoudius ". Member of the Union of Bulgarian Artists.

== Technique ==
Parushev works in painting and collage. He developed a collage technique by layering thin, translucent paper without paint. He creates multi-image surfaces using colored paper, combining it with abstract paintings. He uses various types of paper, including napkins and corrugated paper, as well as sawdust and wood bark.

There are over 45 solo exhibitions at home and abroad. Participated in over 300 group exhibitions of contemporary Bulgarian art Bulgaria, Austria, Germany, India, Belgium, France, Norway, Poland, Russia, Turkey, Serbia, Korea, Portugal, Slovakia, Netherlands, Croatia. His works are involved in prestigious selections of contemporary Bulgarian Awards: 14 awards for fine arts.

Works are owned by: National Gallery, the Sofia City Art Gallery, art galleries in Rousse, Sliven, Shumen, Pleven, Razgrad, Smolyan, Dobrich. Museum of Contemporary Art - Seoul, Korea, Center for Documentation of collage - Sergin, France, National Palace of Culture Collection - Sofia, French Cultural Institute Collection - Sofia, Cyril and Methodius "Collection - Sofia," Open Society "- Sliven. Private collections in Bulgaria, the United States, Russia, Britain, Germany, France, Turkey, Norway, Finland, Greece, Belarus, Belgium, Netherlands, Slovakia, Poland, Portugal, Luxemburg.
