= Sultana Suruzhon =

Bulgarian painter

- Born: May 12, 1900; Novi Pazar, Bulgaria
- Died: January 18, 1962 (aged 61); Bat Yam, Israel
- Known for: Painting

Sultana Suruzhon (Sultana Souroujon, Bulgarian: Султана Суружон, 1900 – 1962) was a Bulgarian modernist painter, notable for her portraits.

Suruzhon was born on 12 May 1900 in Novi Pazar in a Jewish family. Her brother, Leon Souroujon, 13 years her younger, became a notable violinist.

Suruzhon studied at the National Academy of Art in Sofia between 1921 and 1927 under Tseno Todorov (painting) and Kharalampi Tachev (design). After graduation, she was active in feminist movements. In 1938, Suruzhon travelled for a year to Paris. She immersed there in the local art scene and participated in an exhibition in the Grand Palais with three paintings of nudes. Subsequently, she returned to Bulgaria.

In 1953 Suruzhon immigrated from Bulgaria to Israel, and from then on exhibited internationally. In 1962 she was killed in a traffic accident in Bat Yam, Israel.

Her paintings are exhibited in the leading Bulgarian art museums, including the National Art Gallery in Sofia and the Plovdiv City Art Gallery.
