= Nadezhda Kouteva =

Bulgarian artist

Nadezhda Kouteva (Bulgarian: Надежда Кутева) is a Bulgarian artist with over ten awards in her career. Born in Sofia, Kouteva graduated in Mural Painting from the Academy of Fine Arts “N. Pavlovich”, Sofia in 1971. Ten years later, Kouteva received a full scholarship at the Corcoran School of the Arts and Design in Washington, D.C.

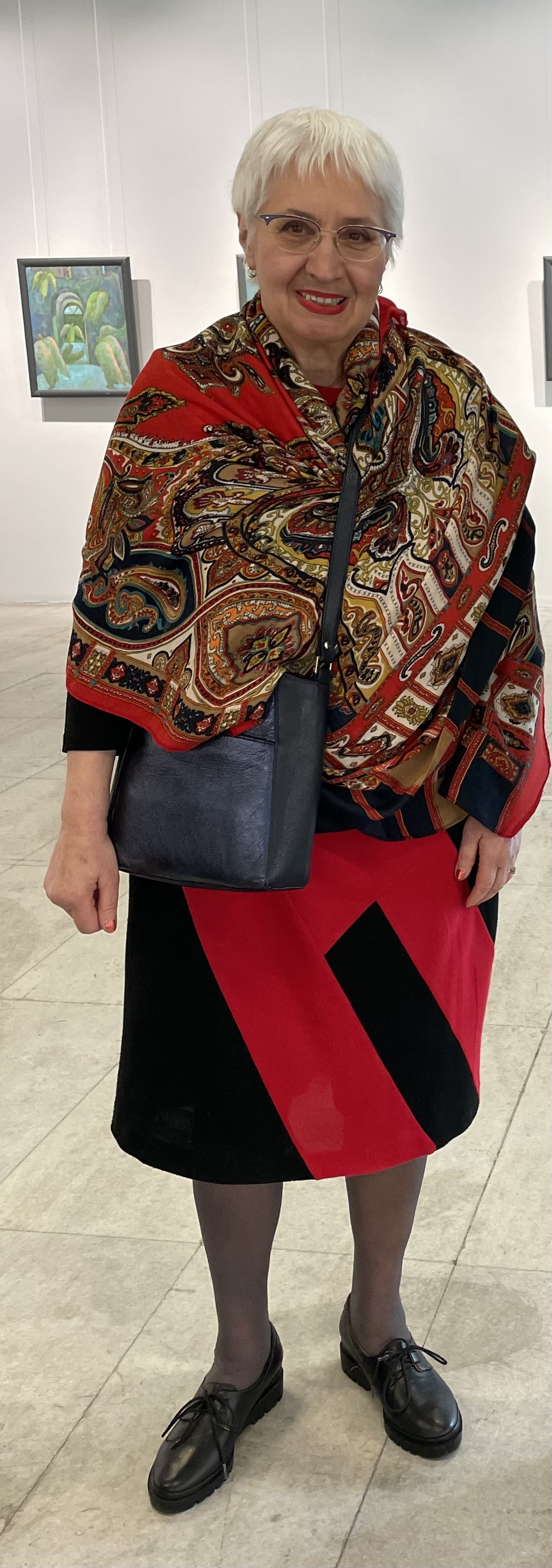
Nadezhda Kouteva exhibition, Sofia, April 2022

Kouteva's first solo exhibition was in 1975 in Sofia. In the following years, Kouteva had over twenty exhibitions in different countries, including Cyprus, Vietnam, USA, Poland, Japan, Serbia, Macedonia, Slovakia, the Netherlands and Germany.

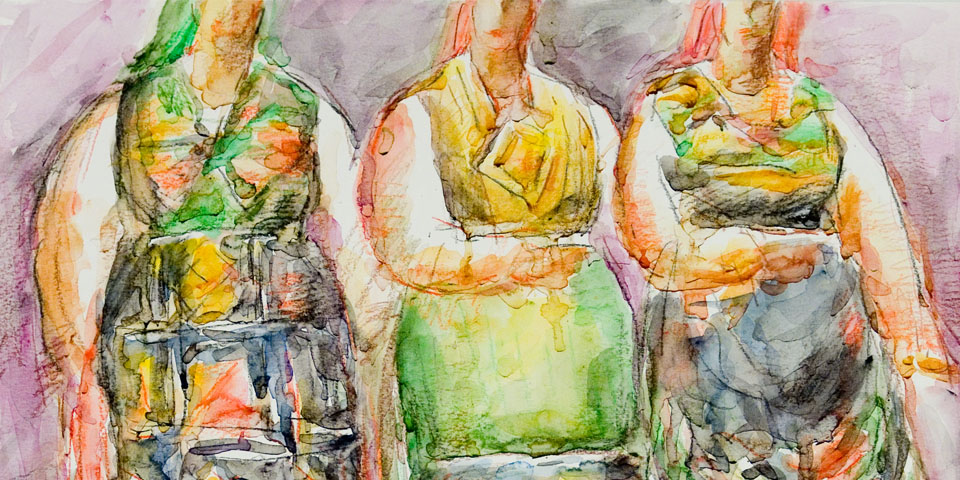
Original Aquarelle Painting by Nadezhda Kouteva

== Prizes ==
Kouteva won her first award in Košice, Slovakia in 1977, the Prize of the Slovakian Artists' Fund. In 1978, she was awarded with the "Humour and Satire in the Arts" prize in Gabrovo, Bulgaria. In 1986, she received the notable Bulgarian prize "Zlatyu Boyadzhiev". In 2006 Kouteva was awarded with the Certificate and gold prize for a high prestige expert of the European Convent of Experts. In 2010, she also received the "Guardian of Traditions" prize in the painters category of the Association for the Development of Arts and Handicrafts in Bulgaria.

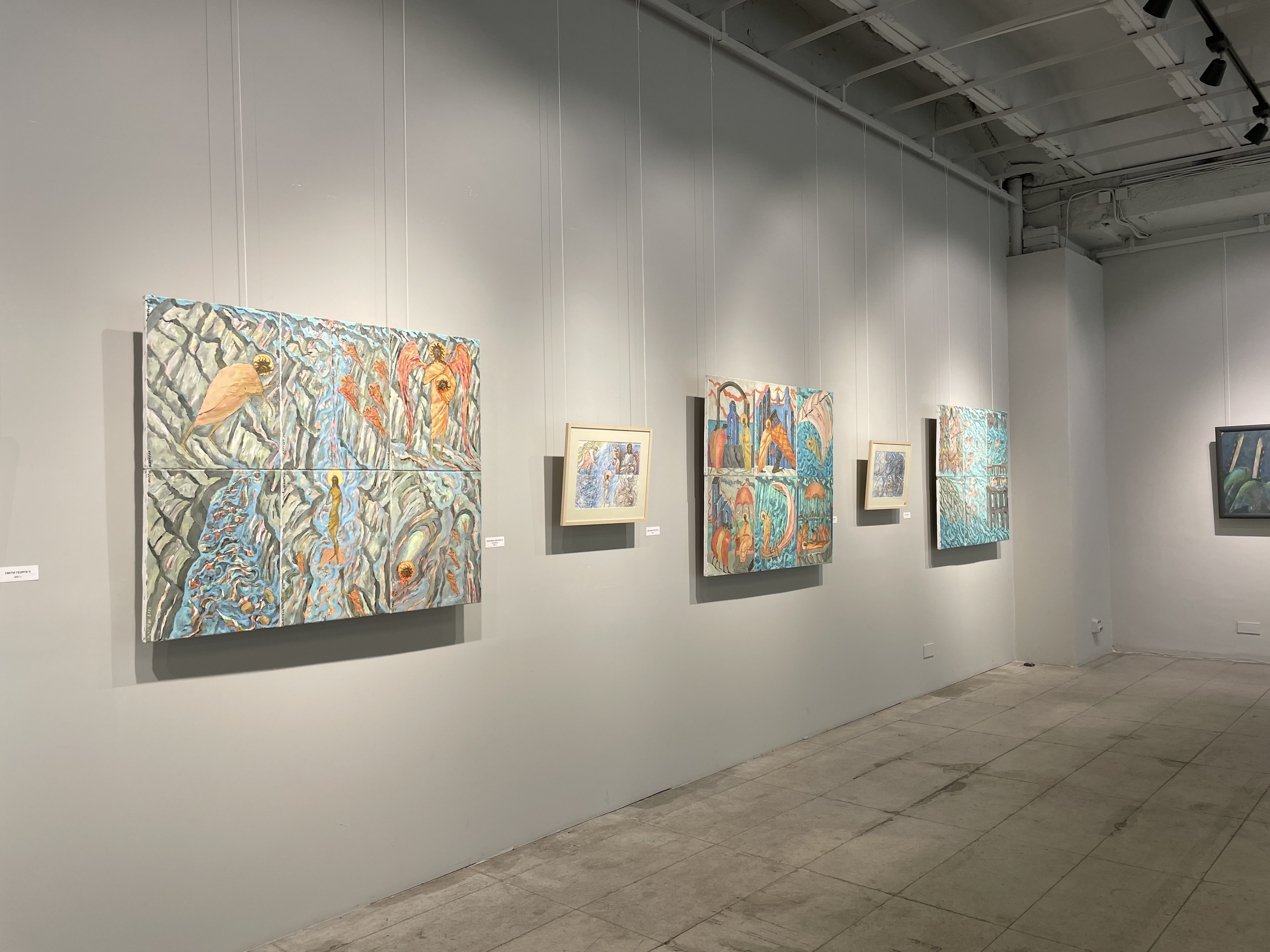
Nadezhda Kouteva exhibition in Sofia, April 2022
