= Ivan Nenov =

Bulgarian painter (1902–1997)

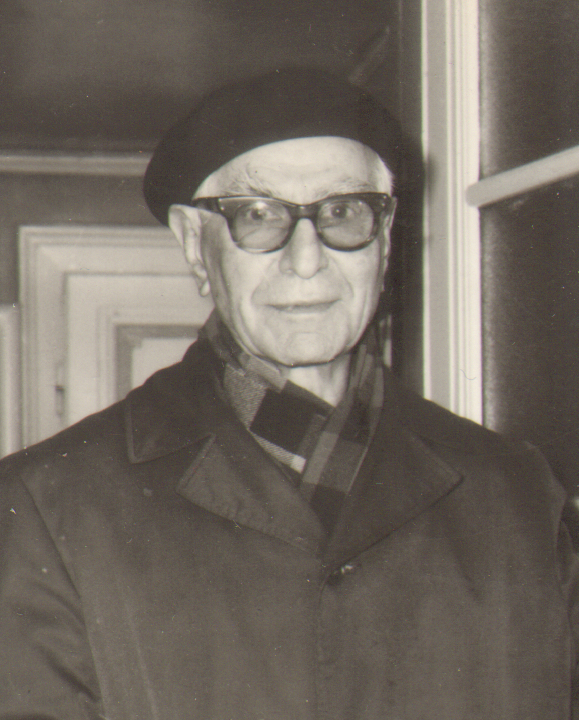
- Born: May 17, 1902; Sofia, Bulgaria
- Died: September 4, 1997 (aged 95); Sofia, Bulgaria
- Known for: Painting
- Spouse: Ekaterina Savova-Nenova

Ivan Nenov (Bulgarian: Иван Василев Ненов; 1902–1997) was a Bulgarian painter.

== Biography ==
Nenov was born on May 17, 1902, in Sofia. He was the husband of Ekaterina Savova-Nenova. He was member of the Bulgarian Academy of Fine Arts. In the early 1940s his studio was destroyed in the bombings of Sofia during World War II.

In the 1950s Nenov was prohibited from exhibiting his paintings, and dismissed from the Academy of Fine Arts for being a Formalist. Subsequently, he began working with clay.

Nenov died on April 9, 1997, in Sofia.

In 2012 the Sofia City Art Gallery held a retrospective of Nenov's work.
