= Daria Vassilyanska =

Bulgarian artist

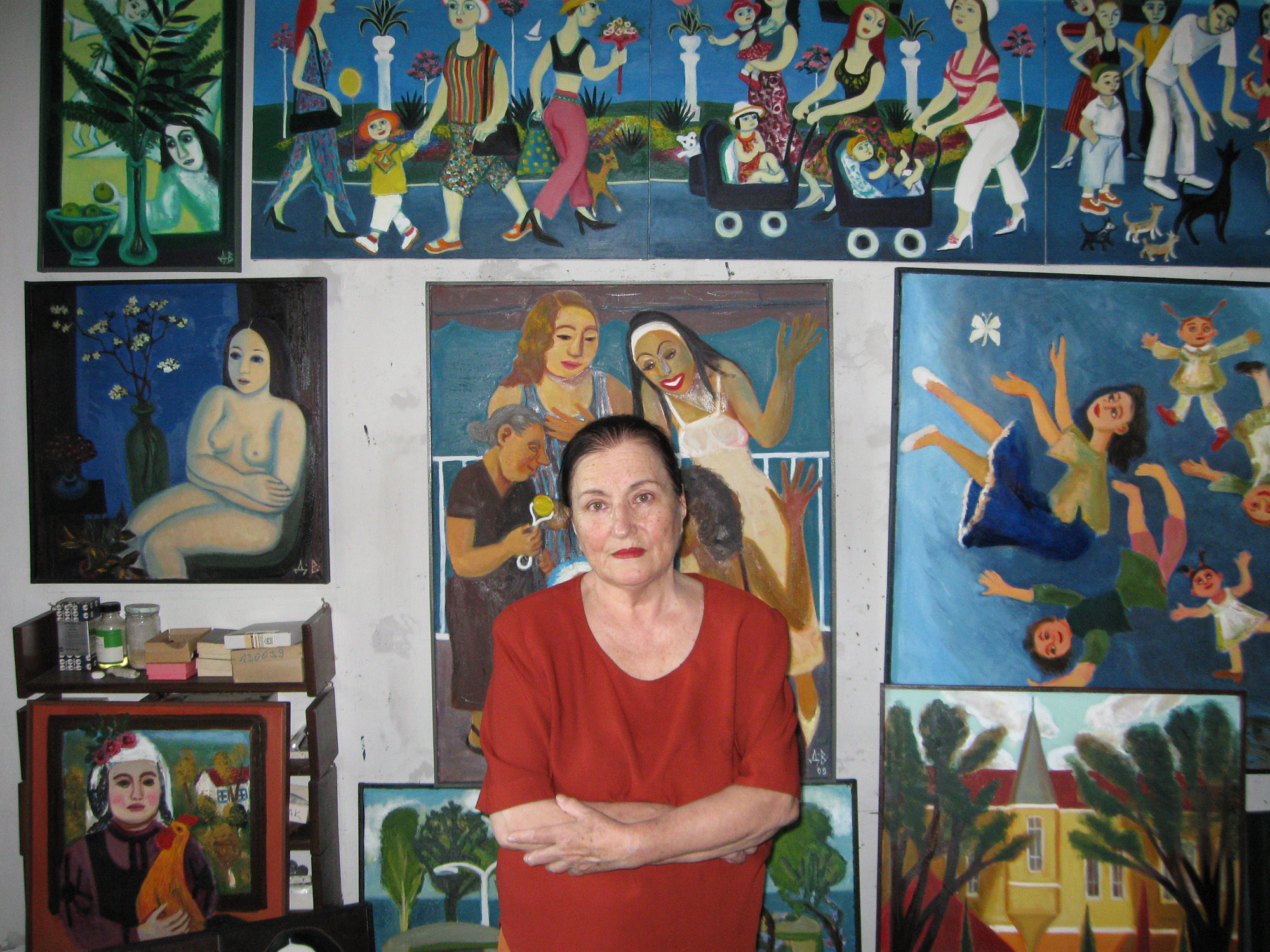
Daria Vassilyanska

Daria Kozmova Vassilyanska (in Bulgarian Дария Козмова Василянска) (1928–2017) was a Bulgarian artist.

== Biography ==
Daria Vassilyanska was born on 28 November 1928 in Varna, Bulgaria. She graduated from Prof. Iliya Petrov's painting class at the National Academy of Art in Sofia in 1955. Beginning in 1959 she took part in all national, group and regional exhibitions of the Union of the Bulgarian Artists. Vassilyanska lived and worked in Varna. Her husband was the Bulgarian theatre director Stancho Stanchev. She died on 4 December 2017 in Varna. She was a free-lance artist in the sphere of easel painting, scenography, monumental-decorative murals and applied art. Her works are owned by The National Art Gallery, Sofia City Art Gallery, Varna City Art Gallery, 22 state art galleries in Bulgaria, institutions and private collections in the country and abroad.

== Solo exhibitions ==
- 1974 – "BWA" Sopot Gallery, Gdańsk, Poland
- 1975 – Exhibition Hall at 65 "Knyaz Boris I" – Varna
- 1975 – "Lamartine" museum, the Old town of Plovdiv
- 1976 – Gallery of the Union of the Bulgarian Artist "Shipka 6" Sofia
- 1976 – Göttingen, Germany
- 1977 – Art Fest – Oreshak
- 1998 – The Ladies, the Ladies up on Stage – "Art 36" Gallery, Sofia
- 1998 – Jubilee exhibition at the Varna City Gallery 'Boris Georgiev'
- 1999 – Sundry Pictures, "TED" Gallery, Varna
- 1999 – Daria’s Cats, "Georgi Velchev" museum, Varna
- 2000 – Little Landscapes with the Sea, "Gallery 8", Varna
- 2001 – Madonnas, "Gallery 8", Varna
- 2001 – Grimaces and Smiles, "Georgi Velchev" Art Museum, Varna
- 2002 – Madonnas, "Art 36" Gallery, Sofia
- 2002 – Greetings, Bearers of Culture!, "Gallery 8", Varna
- 2003 – The Threepenny Exhibition, "Gallery 8", Varna
- 2004 – Seaside, "Dyakov" Gallery, Plovdiv
- 2004 – Old-fashioned Exhibition, "Artin" Gallery, Varna
- 2006 – Looking at Things More Beautiful, "Artin" Gallery, Varna
- 2008 – Exhibition at "Zlatyu Boyadzhiev" Museum – Old Plovdiv
- 2008 – With These Ones I Feel Fine, Jubilee exhibition at the Varna City Gallery 'Boris Georgiev'
- 2014 – Smiles and Grimaces at Varna City Gallery 'Boris Georgiev'
- 2016 – Paper Pictures at Varna City Gallery
- 2016 – Daria’s Cats – Second Hand] at the House of Architect in Varna
- 2017 – In Memoriam – Varna City Gallery "Boris Georgiev"

== Participation in international exhibitions ==
- 1976 International Biennial of Painting – Košice, Slovakia, Art Fair – Göttingen, Germany, International Triennial of Realistic Painting – Sofia
- 1981, 1983, 1985, 1989, 2001, 2003 International Biennial of Humour and Satire – Gabrovo
- 1996 International Triennial of Painting – Sofia
- 2000–2014 Biennial of Visual Arts "August in Art" – Varna
- 2004 Balkan Quadrennial of Painting "Myths and Legends of My People" – Stara Zagora

== Participations in representative exhibitions of the Union of Bulgarian Artists abroad ==
- 1961 Budapest, Hungary
- 1967, 1973, 1979, 1984 Odessa, Ukraine
- 1969 Braila, Romania; Turku, Finland
- 1970 Warsaw, Poland
- 1974 Moscow, Russia; Vichy, France
- 1983 Berlin, Germany
- 1985 Kuwait
- 1993 Tokyo, Japan

== More significant participations in general exhibitions and competitions ==
- 1972,1974,1978 General Art Exhibition "Friends of the Sea" – Burgas
- 1978,1979 General Art Exhibition "The Drawing" – Sofia
- 1982,1985 General Art Exhibition "Small Format" – Sliven
- 1983 General Art Exhibition "Drawings and Figurines" – Sofia
- 2003 "The Jazz of Optimists" – Rayko Aleksiev Gallery, Sofia
- 2005 General Art Exhibition "Portrait" – Shipka 6 Gallery, Sofia
- 2007 General Art Exhibition "Traffic" – Shipka 6 Gallery, Sofia
- 2008 Exhibition National Competition "Allianz Bulgaria" for painting, sculpture and prints.
- 2013 Seventh National Exhibition "Art Collages" – Plovdiv
- 2014 "Then and Now" – representative exhibition of 30 renowned Bulgarian painters at "Shipka 6" Gallery, Sofia
- 2016 Visual Chronicles/Nine Portraits
- 2016 "Visual Chronicles/Nine Portraits of Painters" – Sofia City Art Gallery

== Scenography ==
She is the author of the scenography of 10 theatre performances in the theatres of Varna and Shumen: 1955–1956 "Funny Stories after Cervantes’ interludes, staged by Stancho Stanchev, "Vasil Drumev" Drama Theatre – city of Shumen 1956–1957 "Cinderella" by Charles Perrault, staged by Stancho Stanchev, Puppet Theatre – city of Shumen 1956–1957 "Father and Son" by L.S.Tirina, staged by Stancho Stanchev, "Vasil Drumev"Drama Theatre – city of Shumen 1958–1959 Goodnight, Patricia! by Aldo De Benedetti, staged by Stancho Stanchev, "Vasil Drumev" Drama Theatre – city of Shumen 1958–1959 "The Hunchback of Notre-Dame" by Victor Hugo, staged by Stancho Stanchev, "Vasil Drumev" Drama Theatre – city of Shumen 1958–1959 "The Phoney Civilisation" by Dobri Voynikov, staged by Stancho Stanchev, "Vasil Drumev" Drama Theatre – city of Shumen 1962–1963 "The Great Bobby" by Krzysztof Gruszczyński, staged by Stancho Stanchev, "Stoyan Bachvarov" Drama Theatre – city of Varna 1962–1963 "Colleagues" by Vasiliy Aksyonov and Yuri Stabovoy, staged by Tsvetan Tsvetkov, "Stoyan Bachvarov" Drama Theatre – city of Varna 1964–1965 "So Many Poppies!" by Nikola Rusev, staged by Stancho Stanchev, "Stoyan Bachvarov"Drama Theatre – city of Varna 1972–1973 "Seventh Commandment: Steal a Bit Less!" by Dario Fo, staged by Stancho Stanchev, "Stoyan Bachvarov" Drama Theatre – city of Varna

== Monumental-decorative works ==
- 1974 Design for decorative metal grilles and ceramic panels – Dzhanavara, Varna
- 1974 Mural “Harmony” in the foyer of “Chernorizets Hrabar” Primary School, Varna
- 1977 Mural “Shipbuilding” – 250x500 cm – the foyer of Bulgarian Ship Hydrodynamics Centre, Varna
