= Zlatyu Boyadzhiev =

Bulgarian painter (1903–1976)

Landscape by Zlatyu Boyadzhiev

Zlatyu Georgiev Boyadzhiev (Bulgarian: Златю Бояджиев; 22 October 1903 – 2 February 1976) was a Bulgarian painter. He is known for his portraits and landscapes, depicting mainly the Old Town of Plovdiv, Bulgaria's second largest city, and village life in the region.

== Life ==
Born in the village of Brezovo, Boyadzhiev graduated in painting from the Academy of Fine Arts in Sofia in 1932. His work is generally divided into two main periods: until 1951, when he suffered a stroke and temporarily gave up painting, and from his partial recovery a few years later until his death in 1976. After the stroke, he worked with his left hand and in a completely different manner.

The first period is characterized by neoclassical style in composing scenes with scenes of rural life. In the second period of the artist's style changed radically in the direction of grotesque imagery, the inclusion of dozens of shapes in compositions and expressive color.

He was awarded the Hero of Socialist Labor, Winner of the Union of Bulgarian Artists "Vladimir Dimitrov - the Master." Among his most famous works are "Village of Brezovo," "On the table" and "Two weddings." Many of his paintings are displayed in a house museum in Plovdiv.

== Sources ==
- "The Official Record and the Receptive Field: Zlatyu Boyadzhiev in Communist Times". www.academia.edu.
- Гълъбов, З. (2006). Faces of Plovdiv. Nova. ISBN 9789549183139. "Among them in the first place I would mention the museum with the paintings of the greatest Bulgarian artist – Zlatyu Boyadzhiev"
- James Elkins; Zhivka Valiavicharska; Alice Kim (2010). Art and Globalization. Penn State Press. ISBN 978-0271037165.
