= Rumen Gasharov =

Bulgarian painter (born 1936)

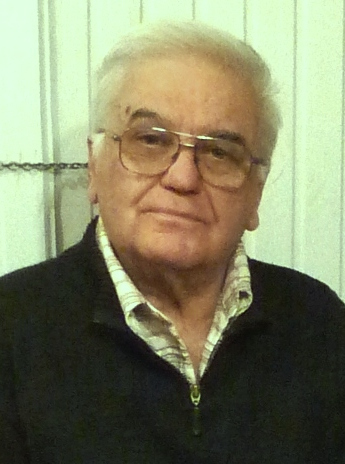
- Rumen Gasharov, Bulgarian painter, 2009
- Born: May 22, 1936 (age 90); Plovdiv, Bulgaria
- Occupation: Painter

Rumen Gasharov (Bulgarian: Румен Гашаров) is a Bulgarian painter. His works have been exhibited internationally, including in 20 independent exhibitions in Bulgaria, Czech Republic, Hungary, England, Germany, and elsewhere. Gasharov entered the newly created National Arts School of Sofia, Bulgaria in 1951, and in 1962 graduated from the Bulgarian National Academy of Arts under professor Iliya Petrov.

== Works ==
Paintings by Gasharov are held internationally, including in:

- The Pushkin Museum, Moscow
- The Bulgarian National Art Gallery
- The Sofia Art Gallery (Sofia, Bulgaria)
- 23 art galleries in Bulgaria
- Private collections in Bulgaria, England, France, Italy, Germany, Austria, USA, Cyprus, Dubay, and elsewhere.

His works also include several murals:

- In the Culture Club in village Golyama Zhelyazna, Bulgaria
- The foyer of hotel "Melnik", Melnik, Bulgaria
- The Forum Hall in the National Educational Complex of Culture, Gorna Banya, Bulgaria

== Awards ==
- First award for painting by a national exhibition about the city of Sofia, Bulgaria.
- Award for arts by the Sofia Municipality.
- Award "Vladimir Dimitrov - Maystora"
- First award for painting by the International Festival of Satire, Humour, and Arts in Gabrovo, Bulgaria.
- Award from a national exhibition in Burgas, Bulgaria.

== Sources ==
- "Rumen Gasharov", by Maximilian Kirov, Izkustvo magazine, issue 10, 1967.
- "Rumen Gasharov", by Dimitar Dimitrov, a monograph published by Bulgarski Hudozhnik publishing house, 1978.
- "3rd independent exhibition of Rumen Gasharov", by Velina Bratanova, Izkustvo magazine, issue 8, 1981.
- "Rumen Gasharov", by Vladimir Svintila, Rodna Rech magazine, issue 2, 1983.
- "Rumen Gasharov", by Tasnàdi, Attila, Mai Bulgaria magazine, issue 5, 1983.
- "Rumen Gasharov", by Ruzha Marinska, Izkustvo magazine, issue 10, 1987.
- "Sofia in my works", by Rumen Gasharov, Sofia magazine, issue 12, 1987.
- "Rumen Gasharov", by Encho Mutafov, Otechestvo magazine, issue 19, 1989.
- "Rumen Gasharov", by Elena Popova, Septemvri magazine, issue 7, 1989.
- "Exhibition by Rumen Gasharov in ART36 Gallery", Probmemi na Izkustvoto magazine, issue 4, 1991.
- "Rumen Gasharov", by Ruzha Marinska, Izkustvo magazine, issue 67–70, 1999.
- "Letter to Rumen Gasharov", by Vladimir Svintila, Ek magazine, issue 6, 1999.
