= Dimitar Dobrovich =

Bulgarian artist (1816–1905)

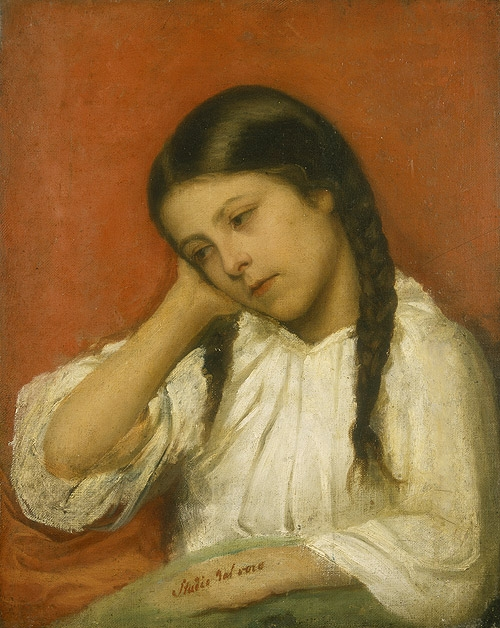
Dimitar Dobrovich, Portrait of a girl (c. 1850)

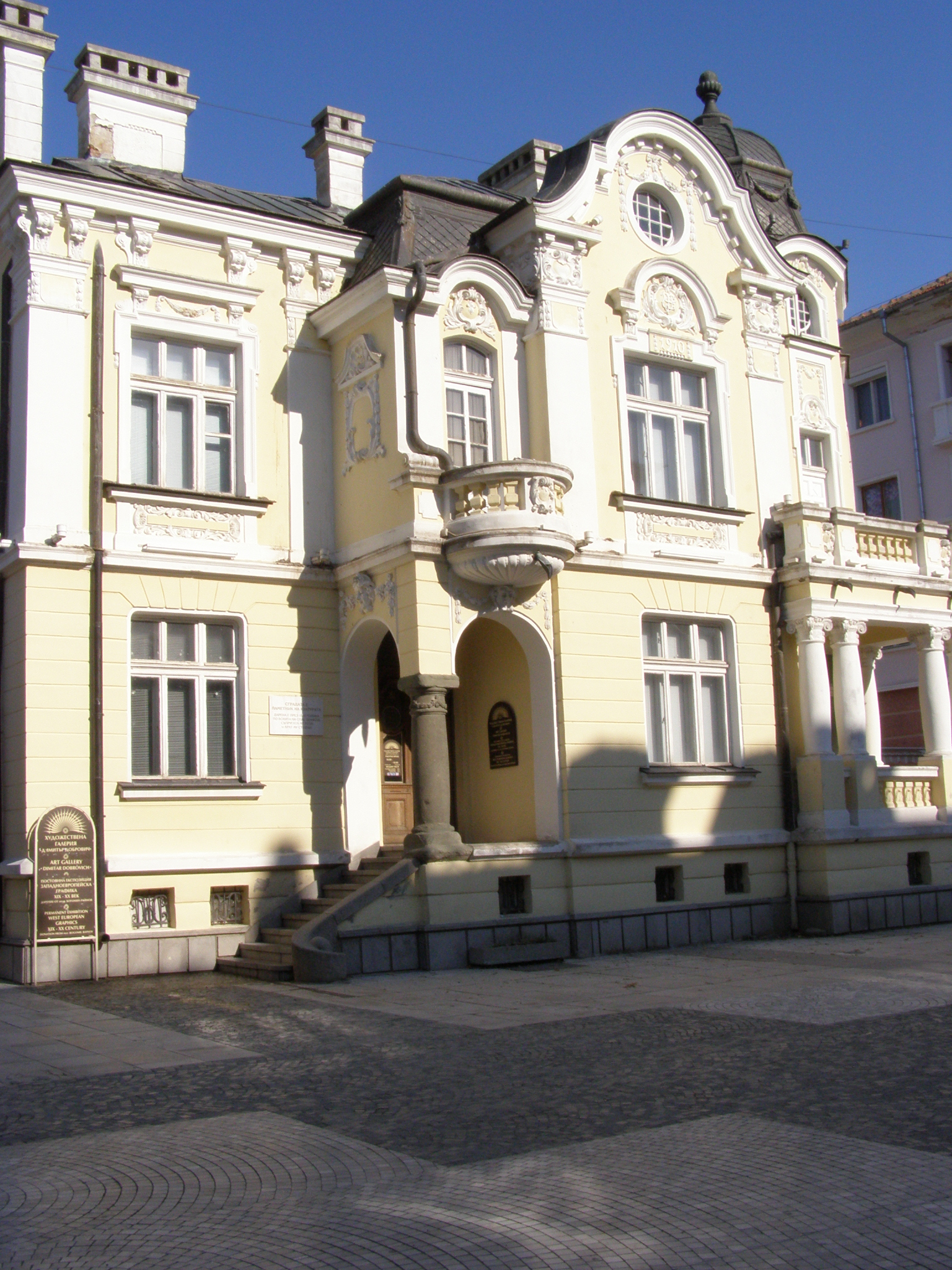
The Dimitar Dobrovich Art Gallery in the artist's native Sliven

Dimitar Georgiev Dobrovich (Bulgarian: Димитър Георгиев Добрович; 1816 – 2 March 1905) was the first academically-trained Bulgarian painter and a participant in the revolutions of 1848 in the Italian states.

== Biography ==
Dobrovich was born in the northern Thracian city of Sliven, then part of the Ottoman Empire, to a freeze dealer and a rich stock breeder's daughter. In 1830, Dimitar left for Wallachia with his grandfather, where he lived in Ploieşti and Brăila, but he did not settle and returned to Sliven.

In 1834–1837, he studied at the Phanar Greek Orthodox College in the imperial capital Istanbul, where he became an acquaintance of revolutionary Georgi Rakovski. Dobrovich continued his education in Athens, the capital of the Kingdom of Greece, where he attended a high school (1837–1840). He was then tutored by French painter Pierre Bonirote before enrolling at the Greek Technical School of Arts, where he was a student of Italian painter Raffaello Ceccoli. It was at that time that Dobrovich started painting portraits under the Hellenized name Demetrios Dobriadis.

In 1848, Dobrovich moved to Rome to enroll at the Rome University of Fine Arts. In the same year, he took part in Giuseppe Garibaldi and Giuseppe Mazzini's uprising and fought actively for three months. Dobrovich graduated from the academy five years later to become the first academically-trained Bulgarian artist. He returned to Bulgaria in 1893, when the country was an autonomous Principality of Bulgaria already liberated from Ottoman rule. He died in 1905 in his native Sliven.

== Works ==
While living in Athens, Dobrovich created icons for local Orthodox churches. However, he broke up with the canonical approach of iconography shortly thereafter to adopt a secular style of painting. Some preserved works from this Greek period include Portrait of a Greek bishop (1842–1843), Portrait of the wife of Italian painter Raffaello Ceccoli (1842–1847, National Art Gallery), Portrait of a girl (c. 1850, National Art Gallery) and Portrait of religious writer Eugenios Voulgaris.

Dobrovich developed as a mature artist in Italy, embracing the style and vision of the late Italian Romanticism. Dobrovich depicted scenes from the daily life of the Italian people, for example Spinner woman, Italian villagewoman, Italian villagewoman with a jar atop her head, Village girl with goats, etc.

Later in his career Dobroviched turned to oil painting and demonstrated an interest in realist art, shown in works like Sick girl. In his late years, Dobrovich painted portraits of Bulgarian National Revival figures Georgi Mirkovich, Georgi Rakovski, Vasil Levski and Hadzhi Dimitar. Upon returning to Bulgaria in 1893 he held an exhibition which included paintings and copies of paintings by Italian Baroque artists such as Guido Reni and Carlo Dolci.

The Sliven Art Gallery is named the Dimitar Dobrovich Art Gallery in his honour. Besides the National Art Gallery of Bulgaria, the National Gallery of Greece also displays some of his works.
