= Dechko Uzunov =

Bulgarian painter

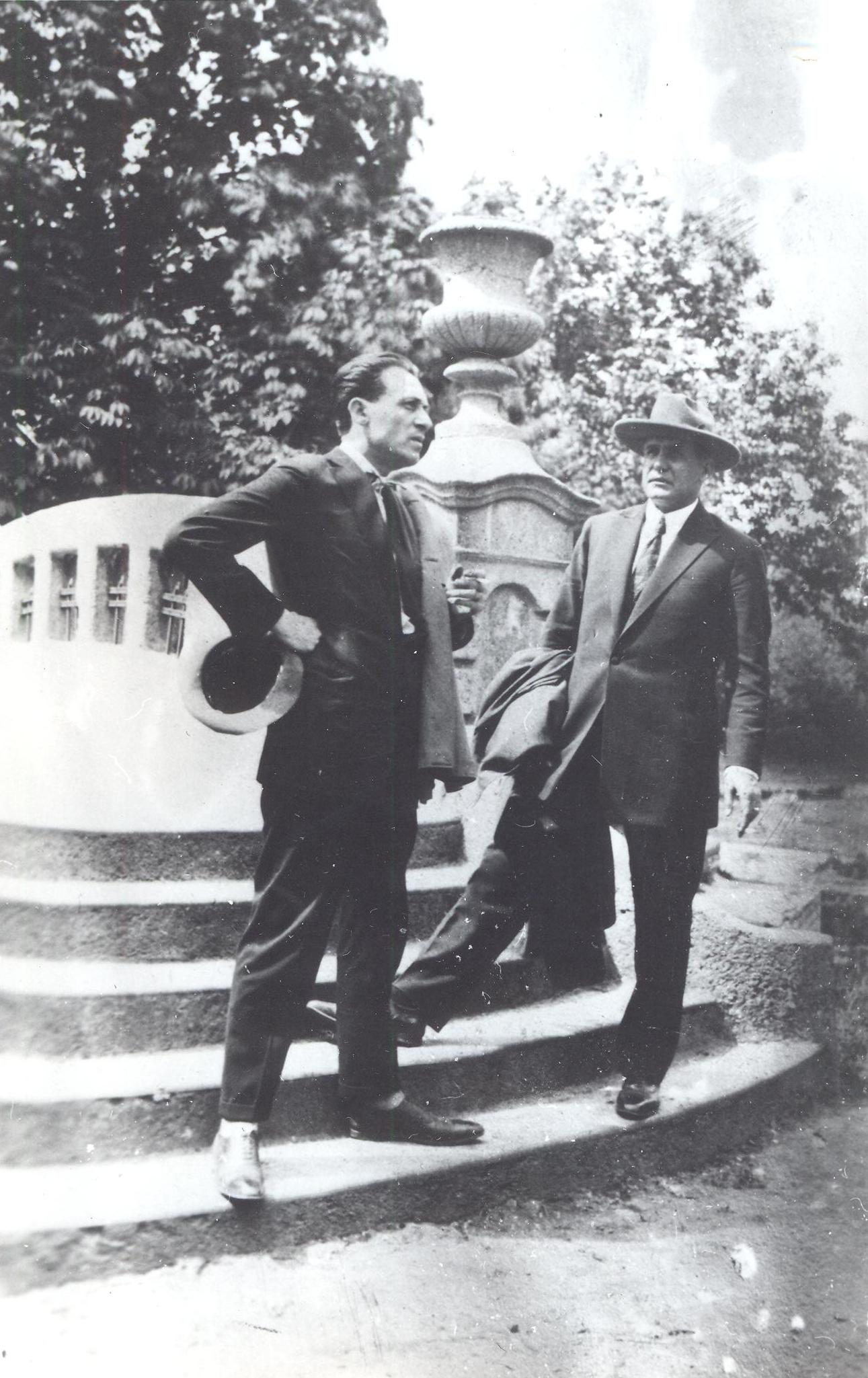
- Uzunov (left) and Sirak Skitnik (right) in Sofia, 1943
- Born: February 22, 1899; Kazanlak, Principality of Bulgaria, Ottoman Empire
- Died: April 26, 1986 (aged 87); Sofie, People's Republic of Bulgaria
- Resting place: Central Sofia Cemetery
- Education: National Academy of Art; Academy of Fine Arts, Munich
- Known for: Portraiture
- Spouse: Masha Zhivkova
- Awards: Dimitrov Prize (1962)
- Elected: Fifth National Assembly of the People's Republic of Bulgaria (1966)

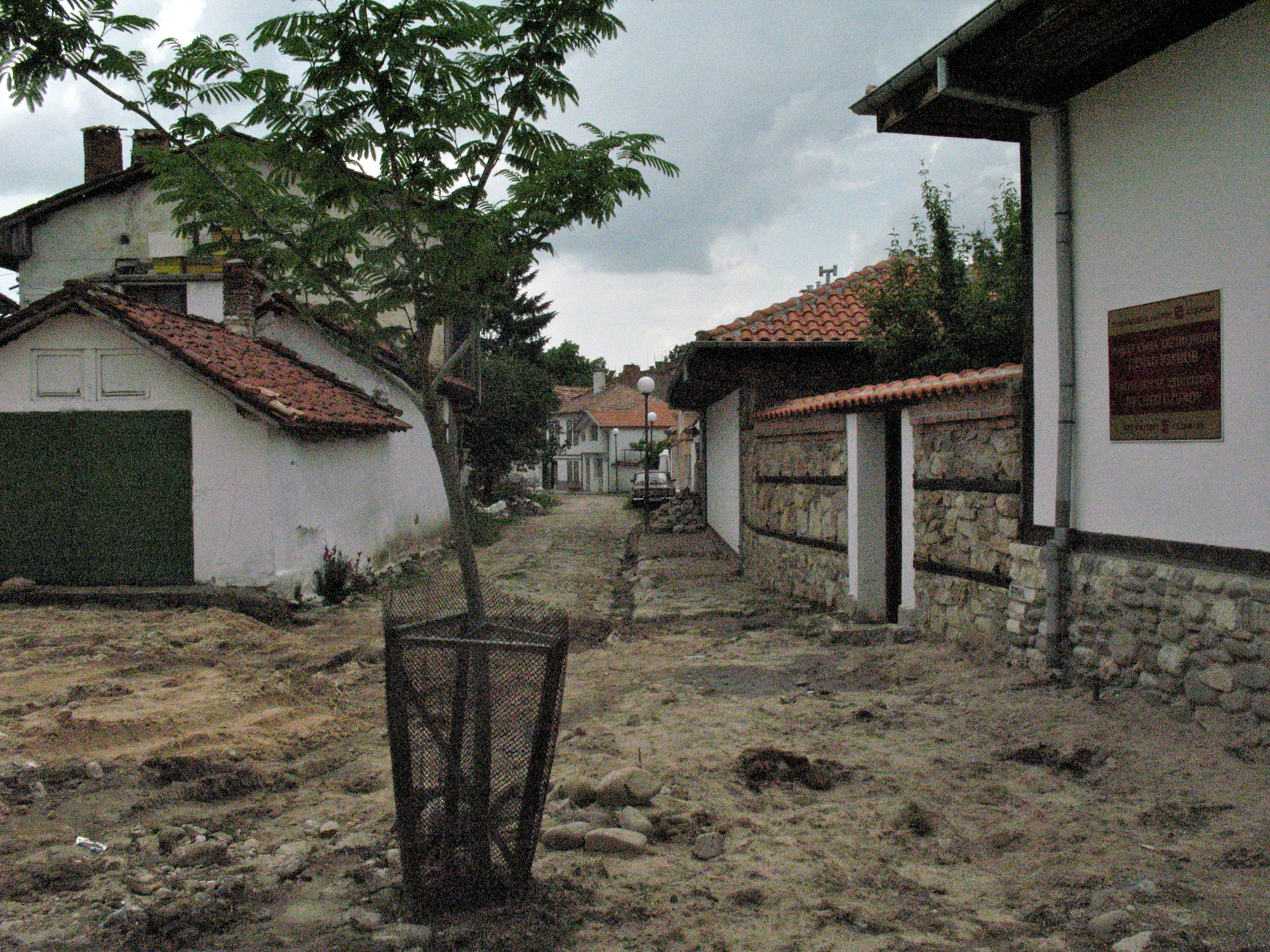
A museum named after Uzunov.

Dechko Uzunov (Bulgarian: Дечко Узунов) (February 22, 1899 – April 26, 1986) was a Bulgarian painter. He was born in Kazanluk and died in Sofia at the age of 87. His work was part of the painting event in the art competition at the 1936 Summer Olympics.
