= Union of Bulgarian Artists =

The Union of Bulgarian Artists (UBA) is a non-profit association for Bulgarian artists which can trace its routes back to 1893. It currently has about 2700 members – artists and critics from all generations – drawn from the many fields of the representational arts. The mission of the UBA is to protect the interests of its members and to promote Bulgarian visual culture at home and abroad. Any artist or critic with proven professional contributions may be admitted for individual membership. The UBA has the largest exhibition complex in Bulgaria.
