= Tilakari Madrasa =

Religious educational institution in Samarkand, Uzbekistan

- Tillakori madrasasi
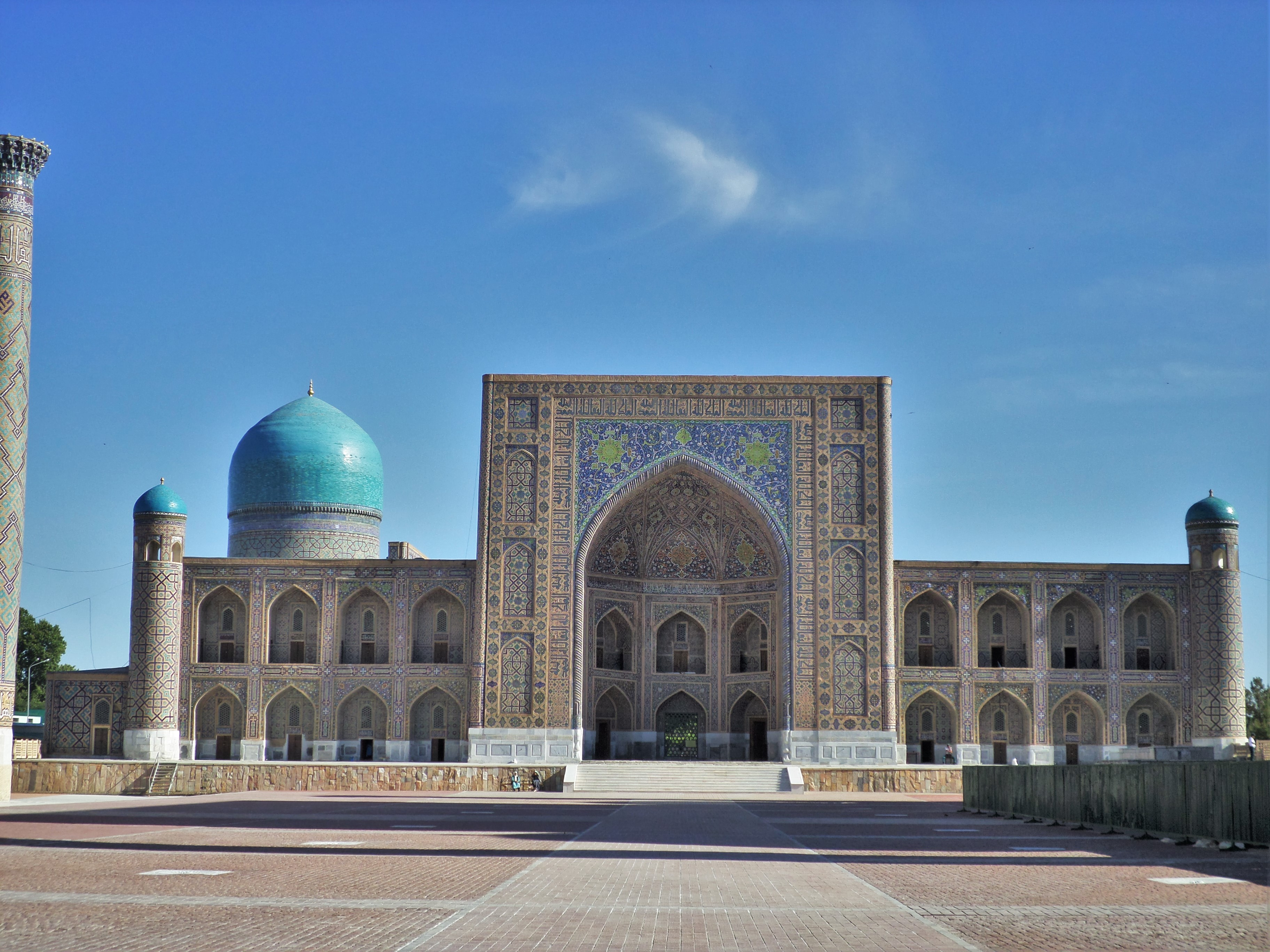
- Interactive map of the Tilakari Madrasa area

General information
- Type: Madrasa
- Location: Samarkand, Uzbekistan
- Coordinates: 39°39′21″N 66°58′30″E
- Inaugurated: 1646-1660
- ^{Part of the World Heritage site "Samarkand – Crossroad of Cultures"}

The Tilakari Madrasa (Note: Also called the Tilakari college; also written Tila-Kari, Tila Kari; alternatively Tila(-)Kori, Tilla(-)Kori via Uzbek; Tilya(-)Kori, Tillya(-)Kori via Russian.) (from Classical Persian: مدرسۀ طلاکاری, romanized: Madrasa-yi Ṭilākārī, lit. 'the Madrasa of Gilding, the Gilded Madrasa'; Uzbek: Tillakori madrasasi) is a 17th-century madrasa (Islamic school) located on the Registan in the historic center of Samarkand, a UNESCO World Heritage Site in Uzbekistan.

== Background ==
The Tilakari Madrasa is the youngest monument in the monumental ensemble of Registan, which is formed by the Ulugh Beg Madrasa, the Sherdar Madrasa and the Tilakari Madrasa. It was built between 1646 and 1660, ten years after the Sherdar Madrasa. The madrasa was not only used for the education of students but was also one of the most important mosques for a long time.

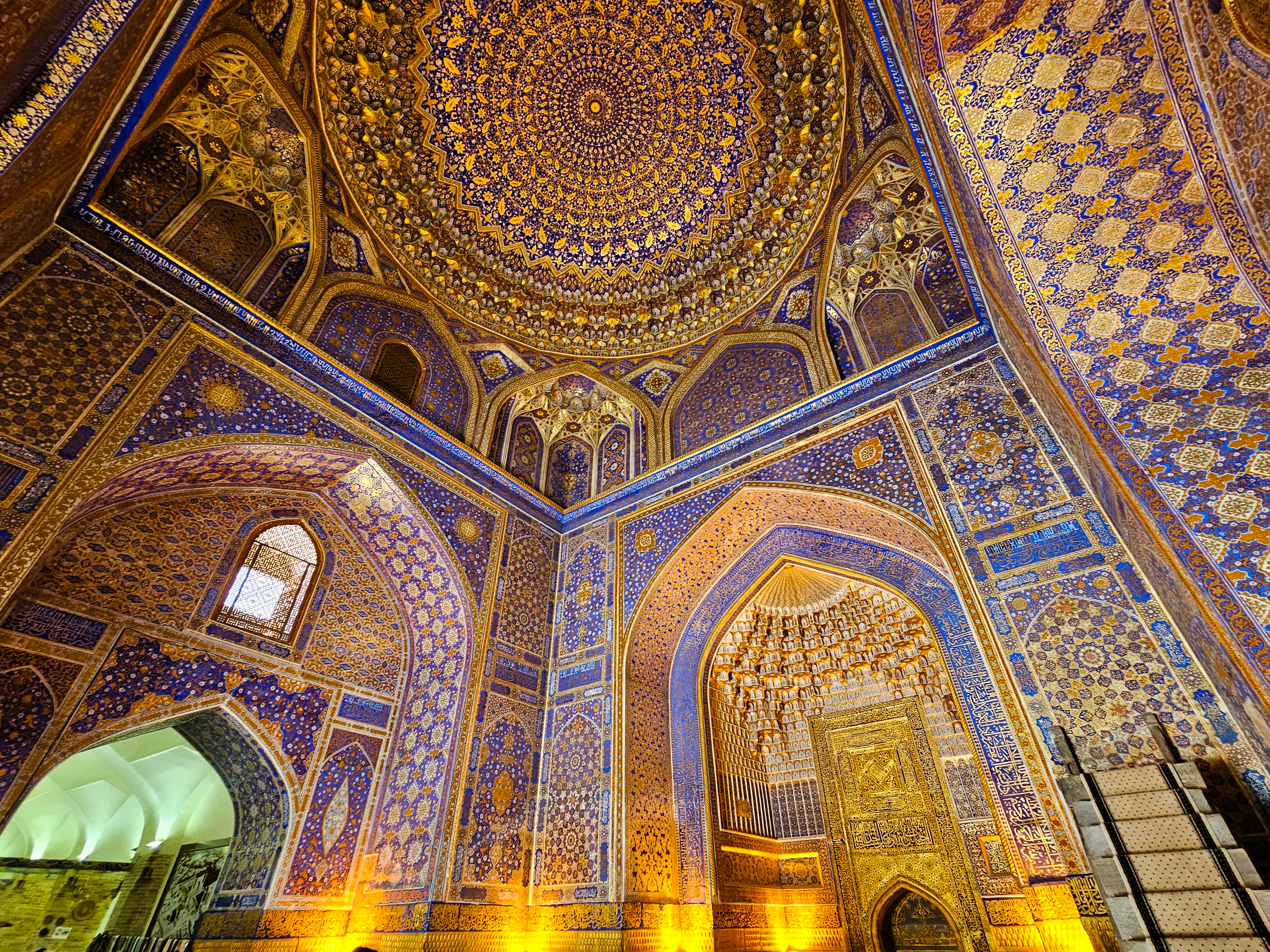
Interior chamber

The Tilakari Madrasa is widely regarded as a masterpiece of Timurid architecture, a tradition deeply rooted in the Persianate architectural and artistic legacy that dominated Central Asia during the 14th–17th centuries. Rather than belonging to a generalized category of “Turkic architecture,” the madrasa reflects the refined aesthetics developed in Iran, Khurasan, and Transoxiana, where Persian cultural and artistic norms shaped the visual identity of the Timurid Empire.

Scholars such as Lisa Golombek, Donald Wilber, Sheila Blair, Jonathan Bloom, and Bernard O’Kane identify Timurid architecture as the culmination of the Persian architectural tradition, characterized by monumental pishtaq façades, intricate mosaic and glazed tilework, muqarnas vaulting, and richly ornamented interiors.

UNESCO likewise describes the Registan complex—including the Tilakari Madrasa—as part of the broader Persian-influenced cultural landscape of Samarkand, shaped by craftsmen brought from cities like Shiraz, Tabriz and Isfahan.

The lavish interior of the Tilakari Madrasa, covered with gilded surfaces and a dense program of floral and geometric patterns, exemplifies the Timurid mastery of decorative arts. Its tilework, calligraphy, and structural composition closely parallel those of major Iranian and Khurasani monuments, reflecting shared workshops, technologies, and artistic conventions across the region. The madrasa's harmonious proportions, turquoise-and-gold palette, and synthesis of spatial and ornamental design make it one of the finest surviving examples of the Persianate Timurid architectural style, rather than a representative of a pan-Turkic artistic category.

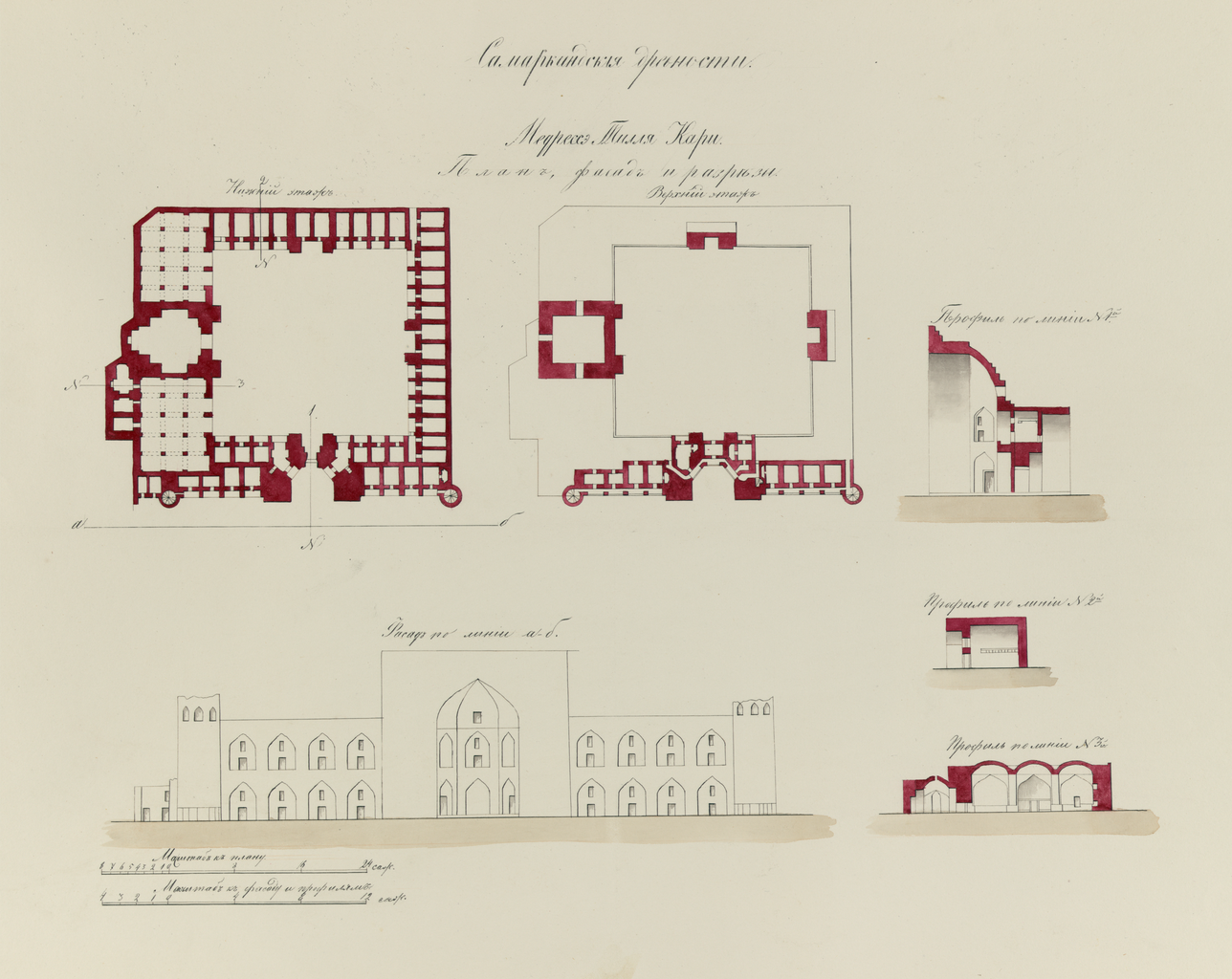
Plan of the madrasa

== Gallery ==
Exterior

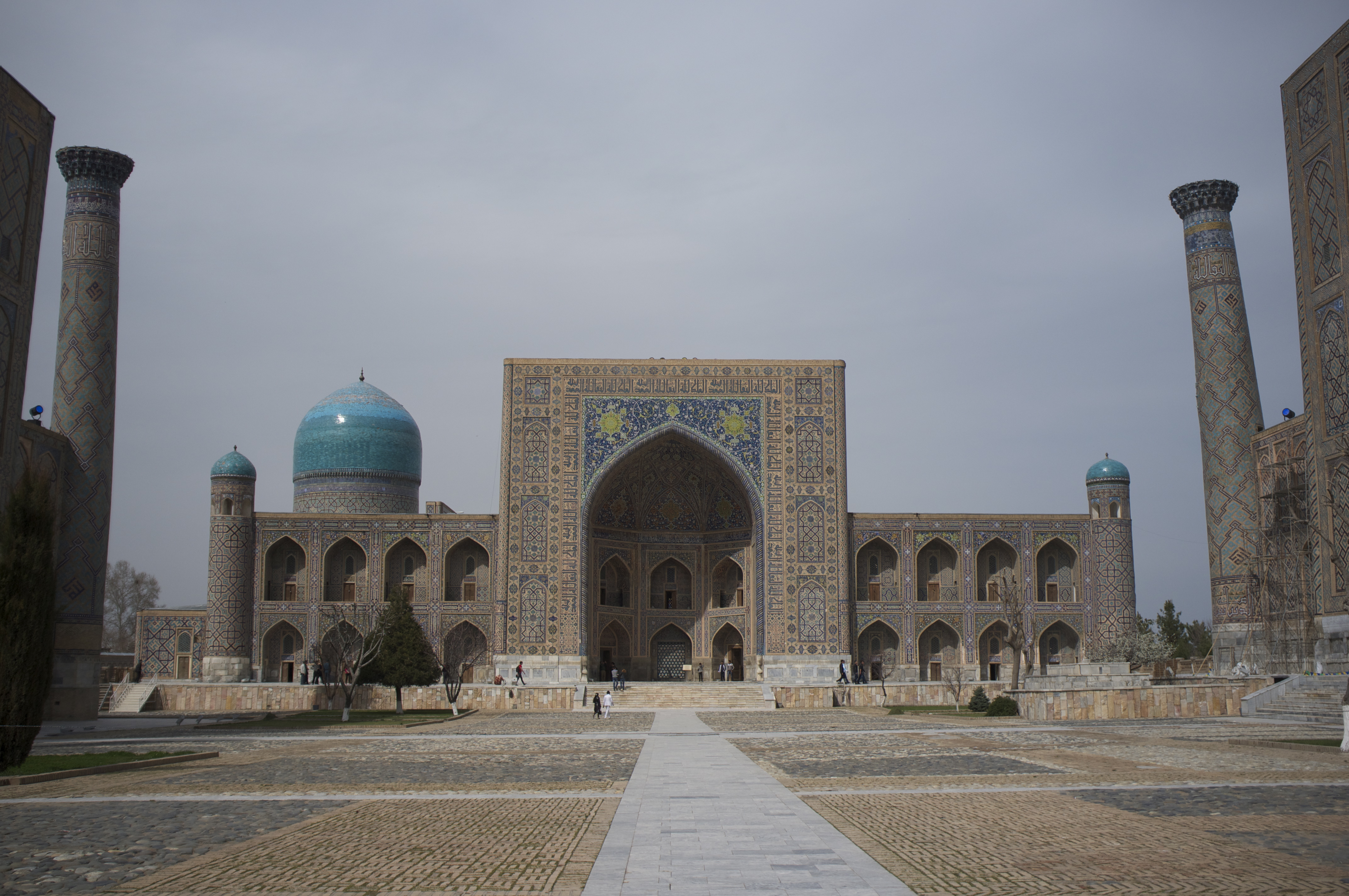
View from the Registan

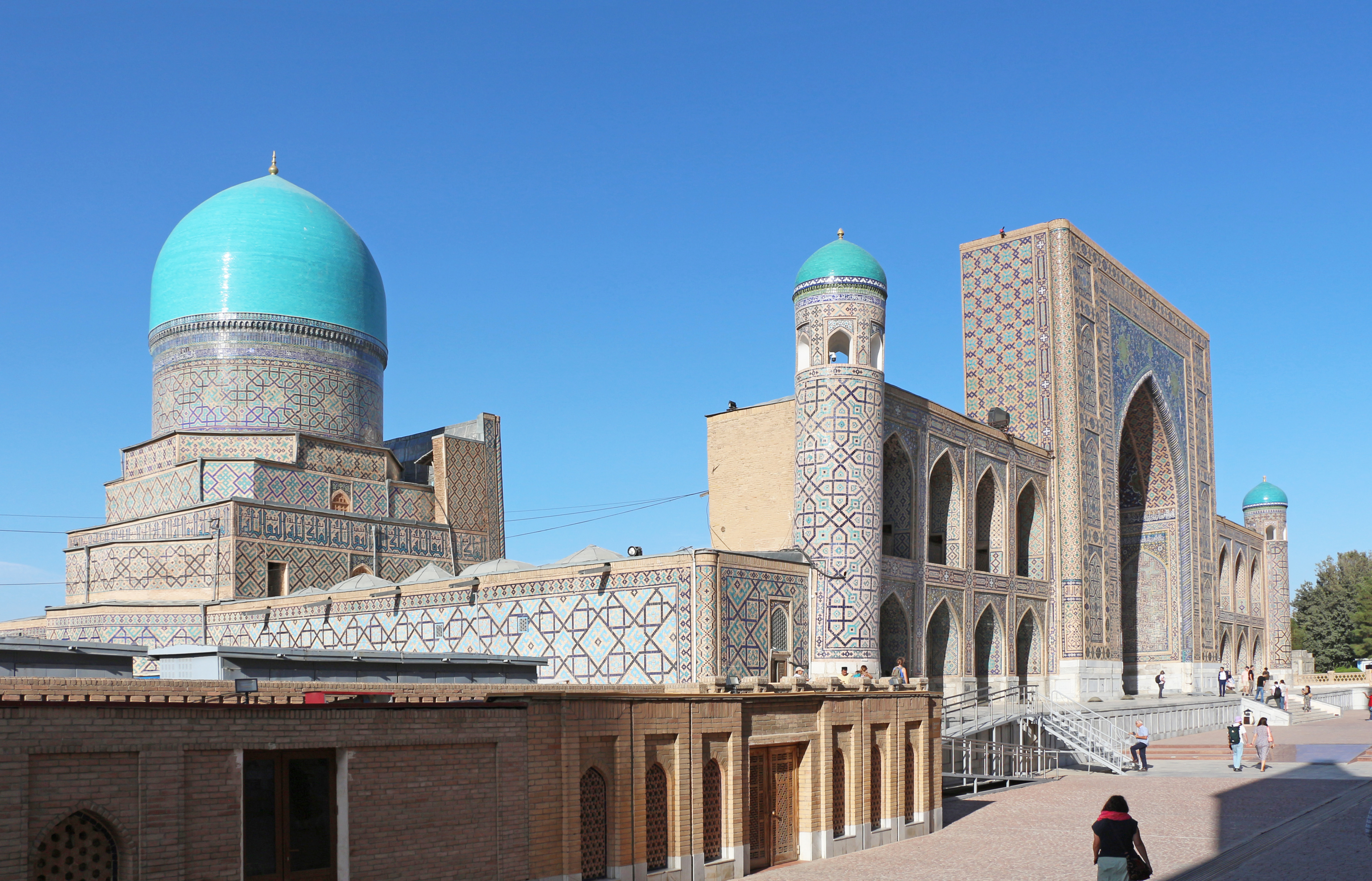
Side view of the madrasa

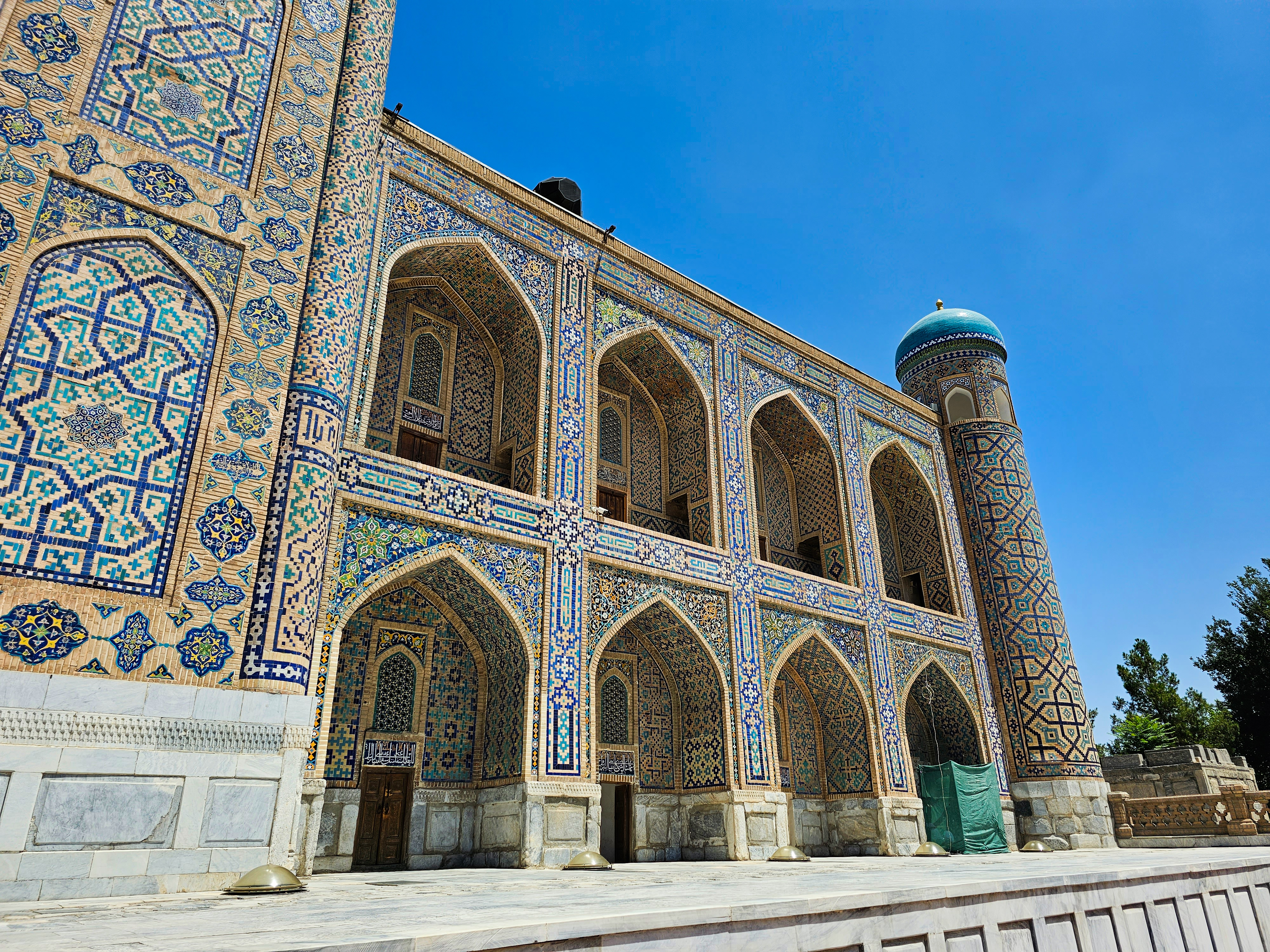
Two storied iwans

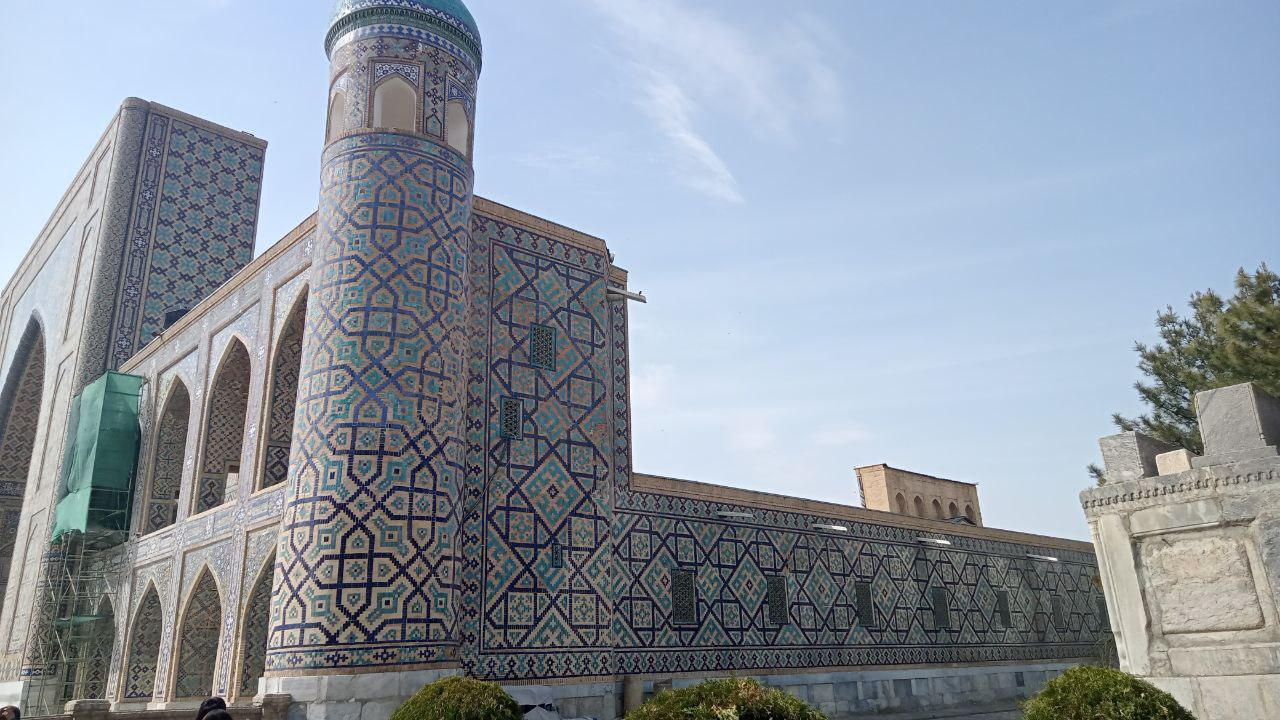
Banna'i decoration on the side of the madrasa

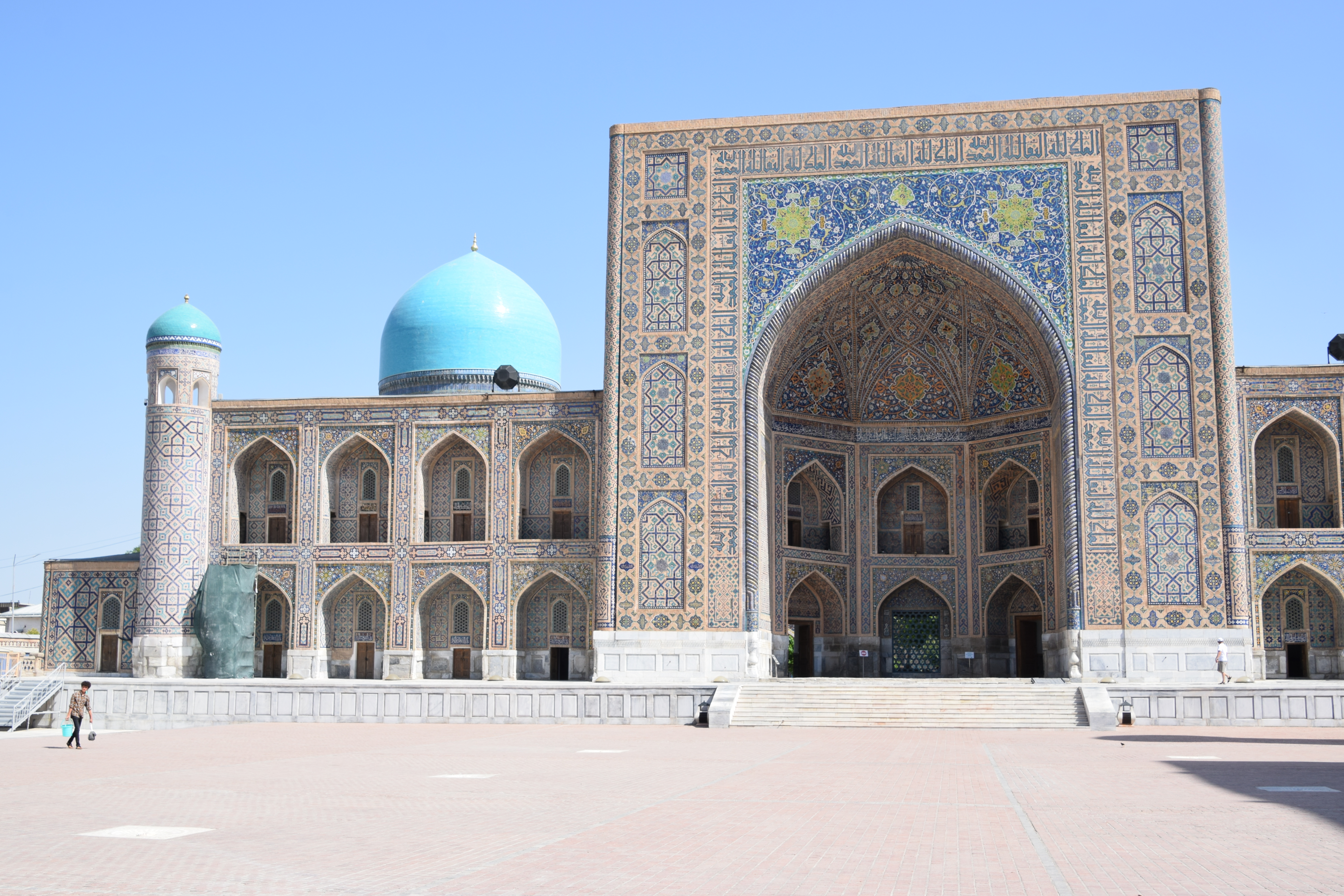
Main entrance iwan

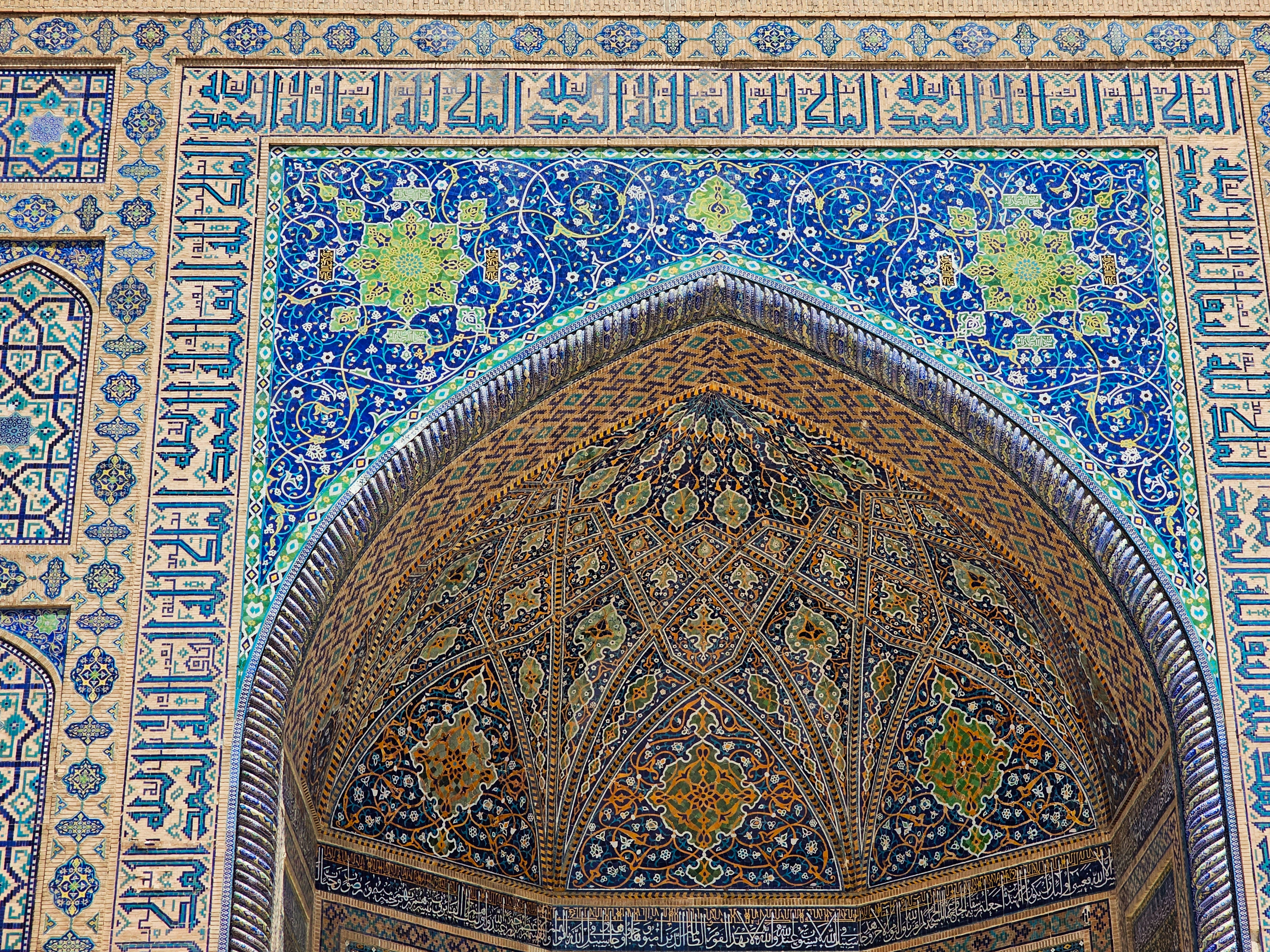
Decoration of the entrance

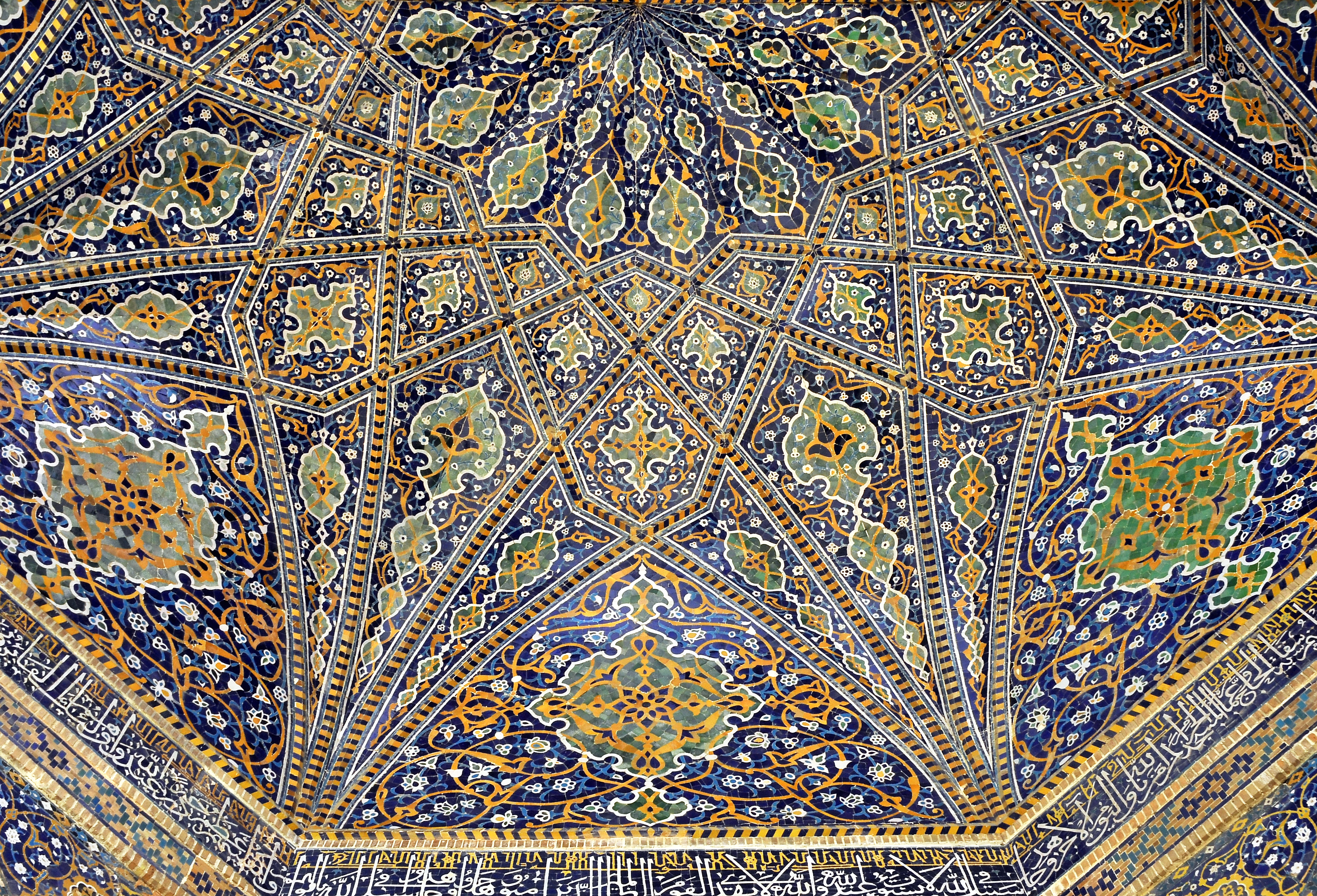
Vaulting inside the iwan

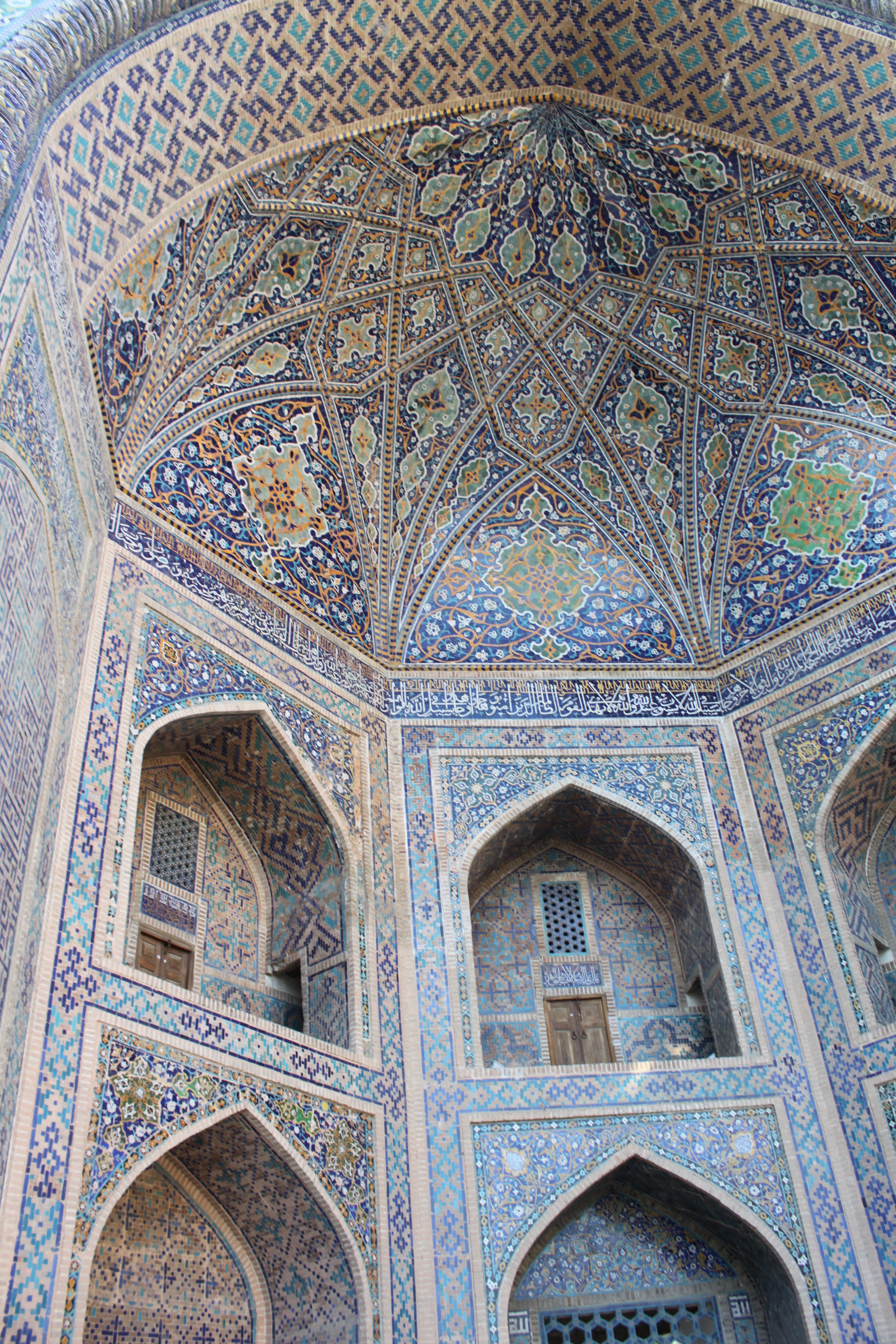
Mini iwans

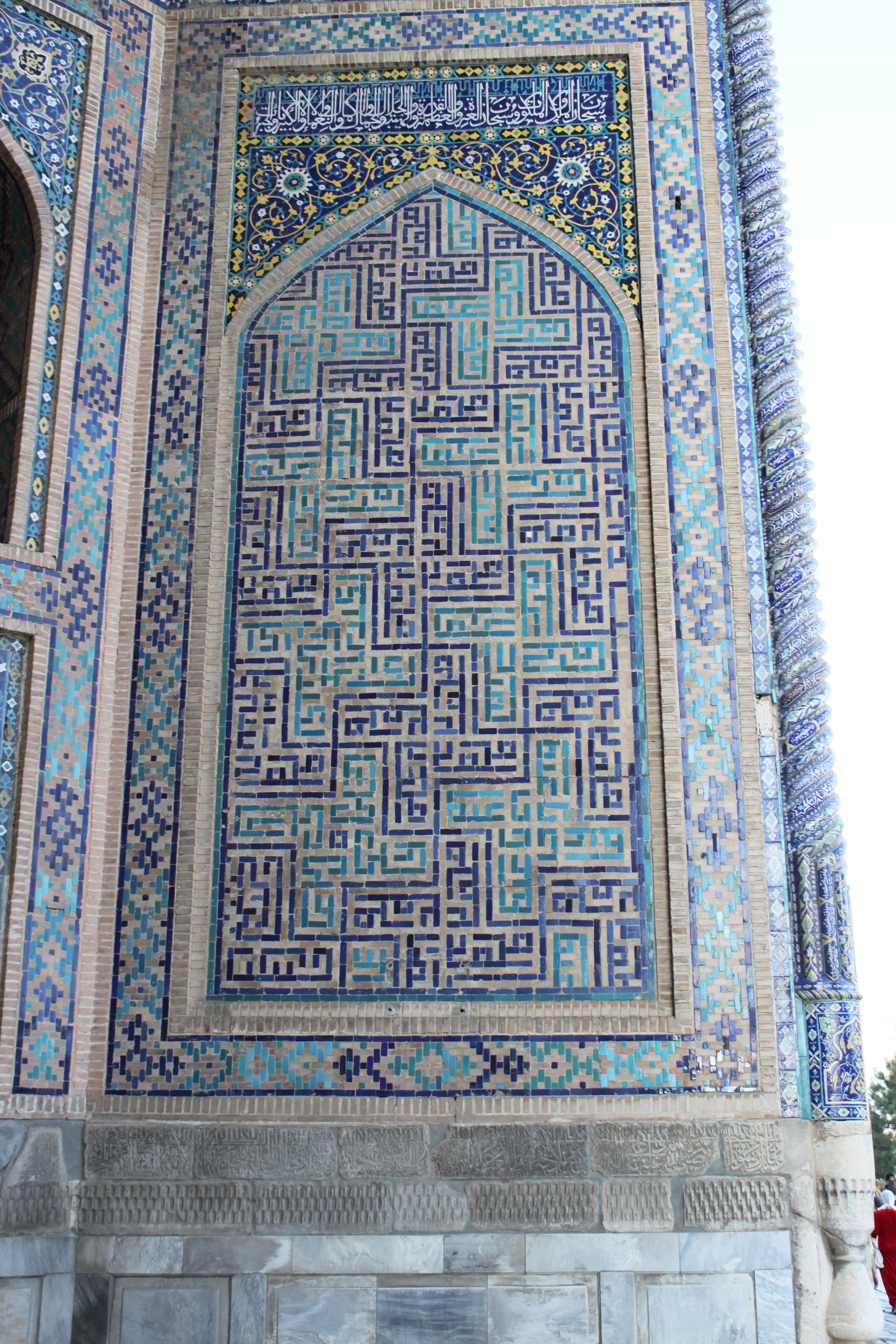
Banna'i decoration

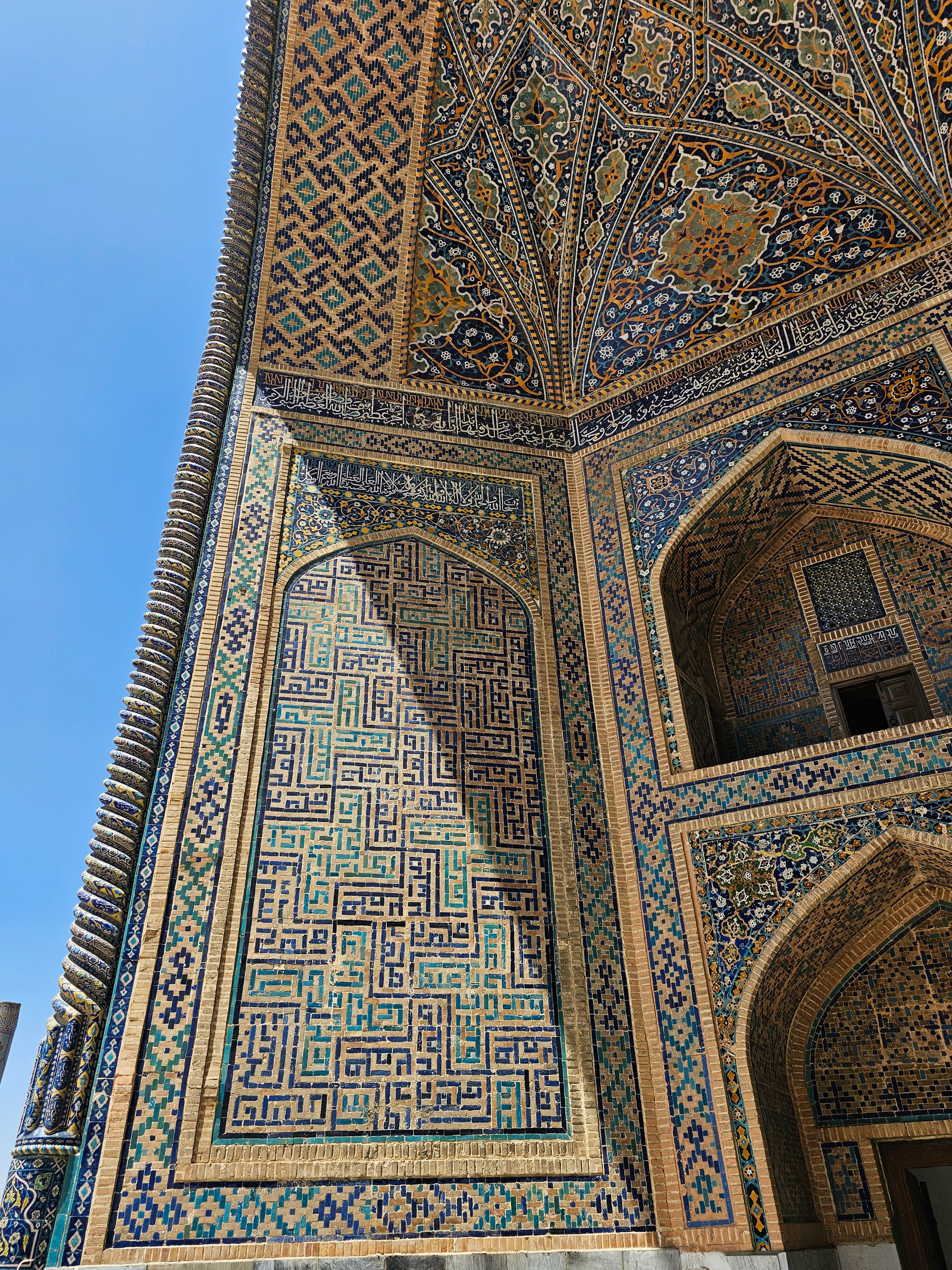
Decoration of the main entrance

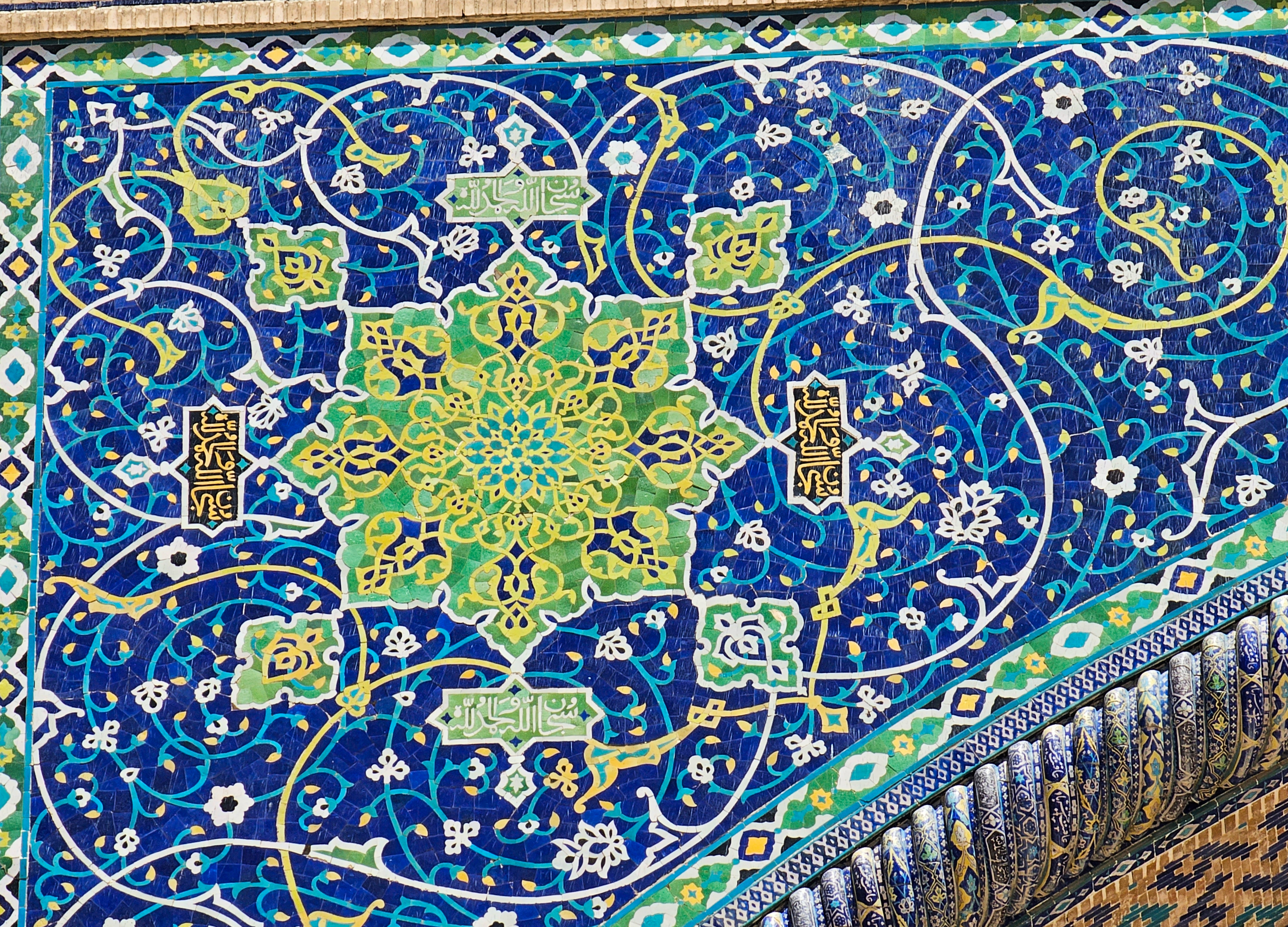
Decoration of the spandrel

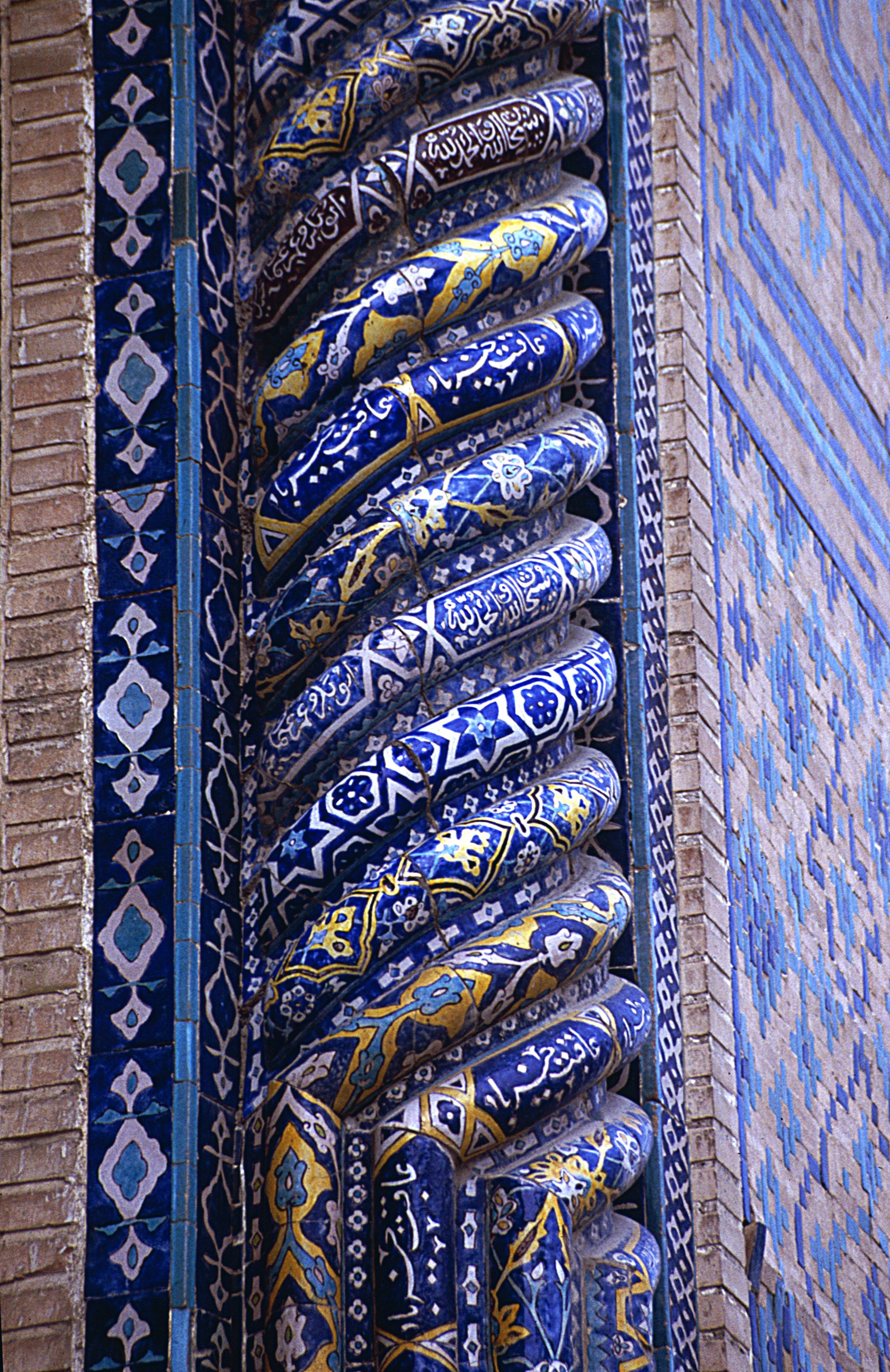
Glazed spiral fluted column

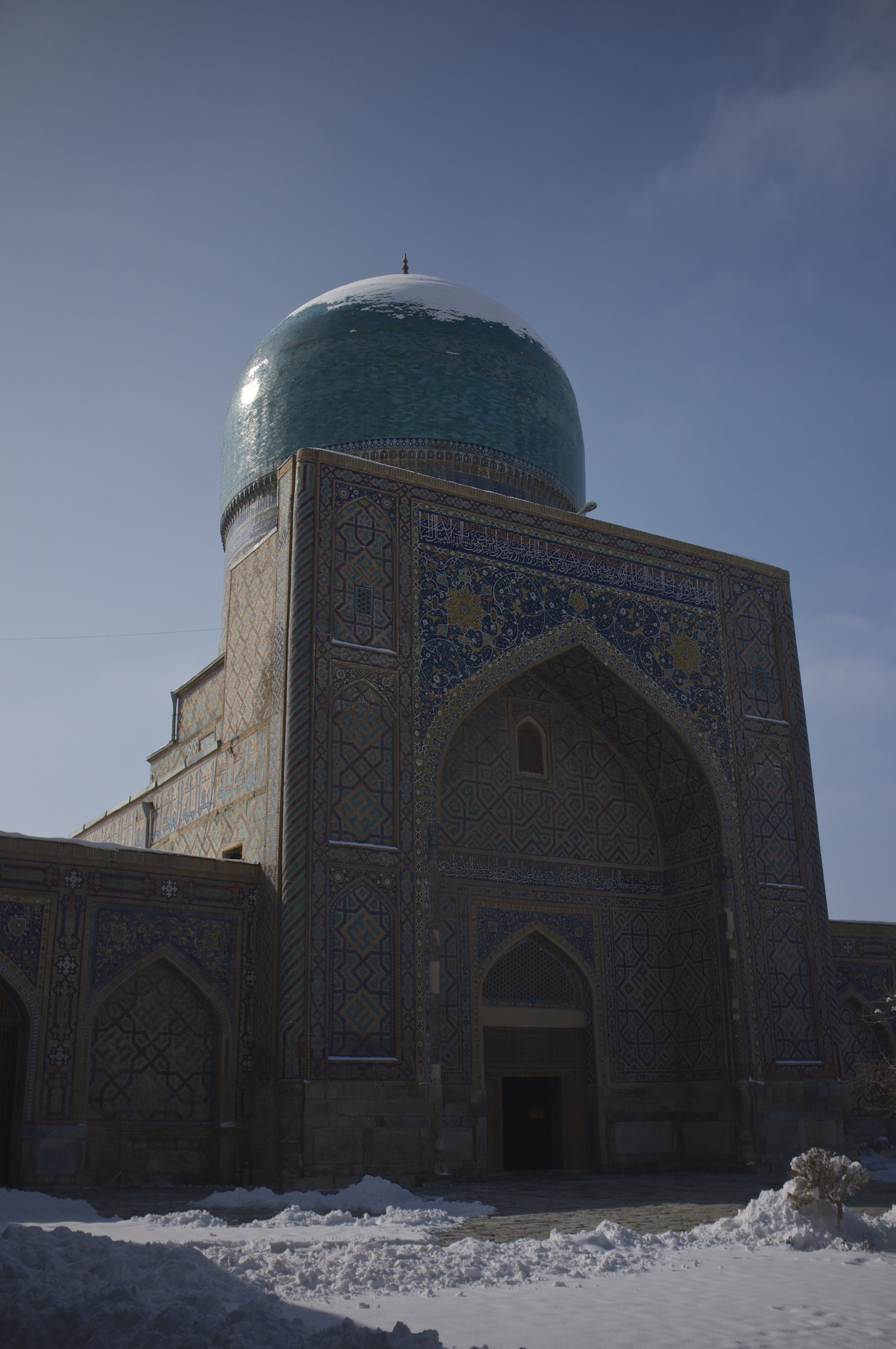
Iwan of the dome

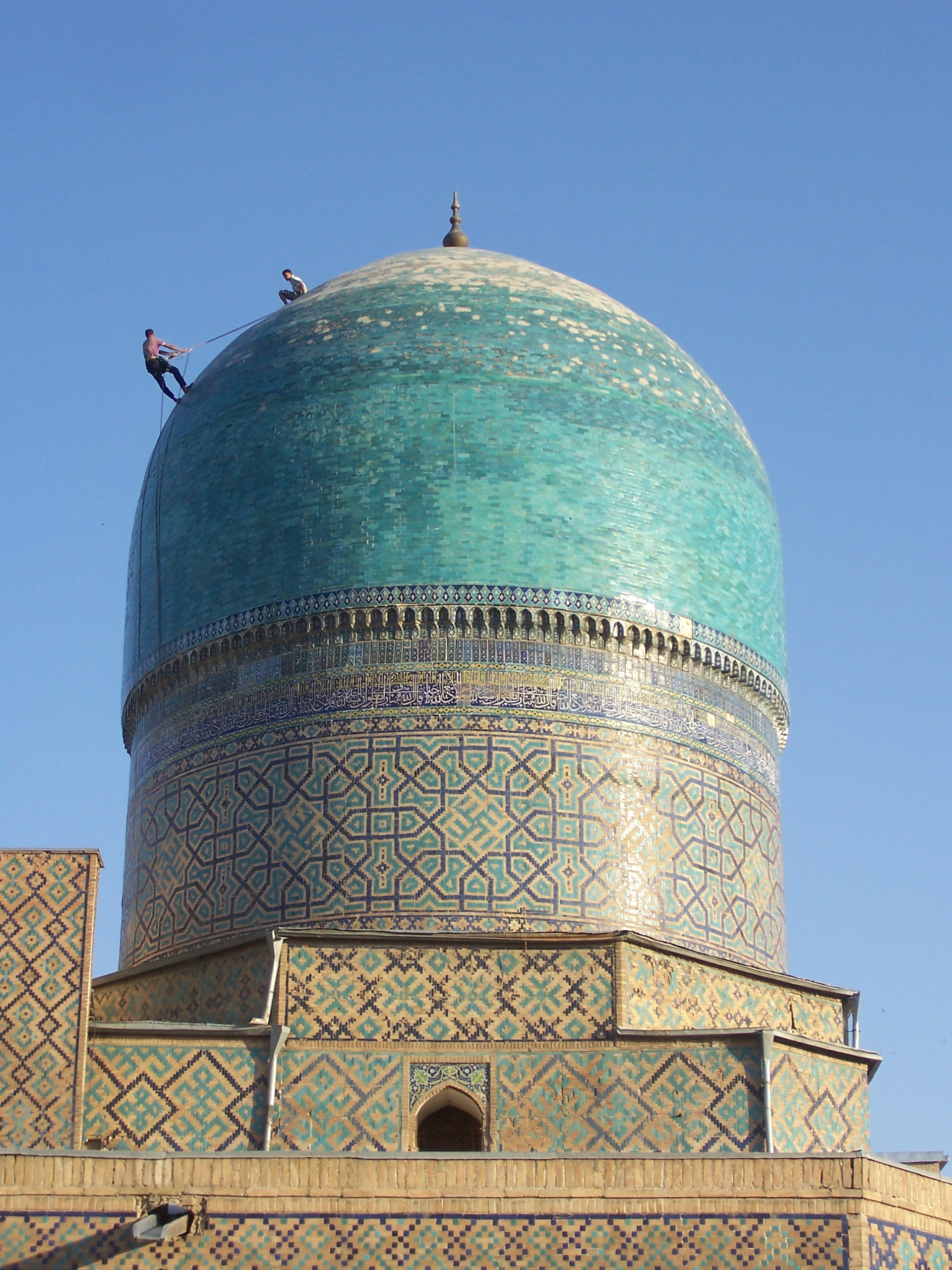
Cleaning the dome

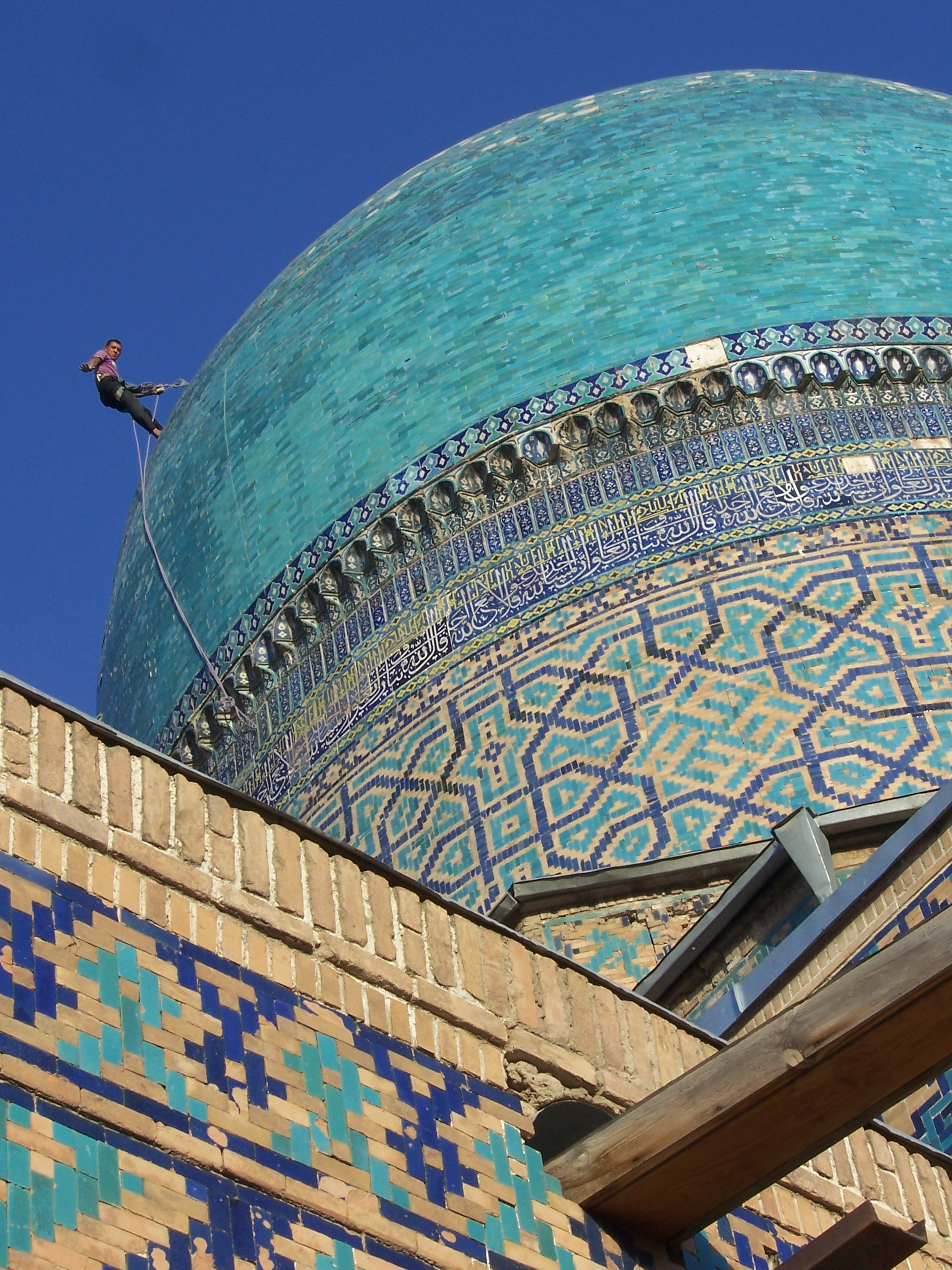
Another view of the dome

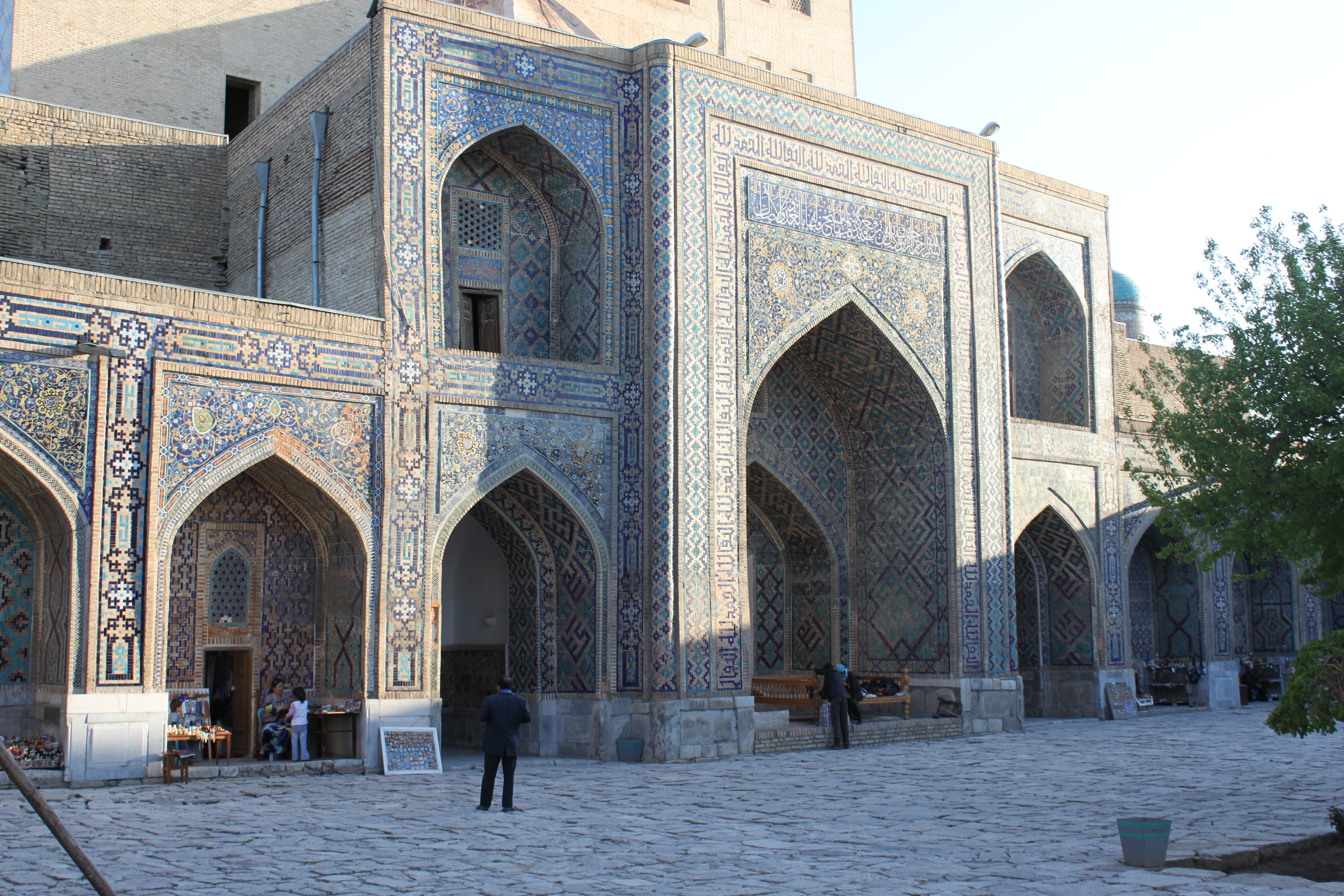
Iwan behind main entrance

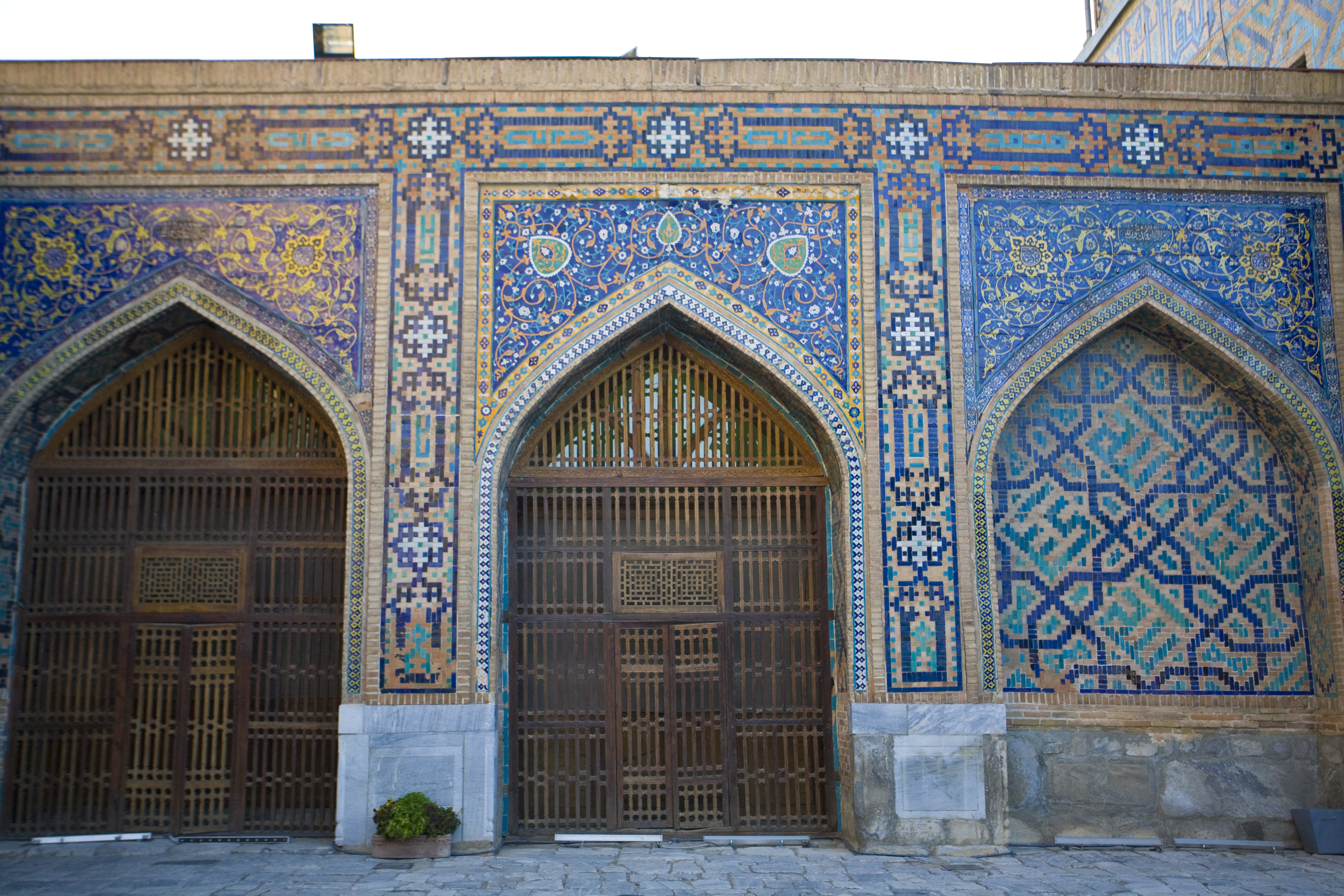
Wooden doors

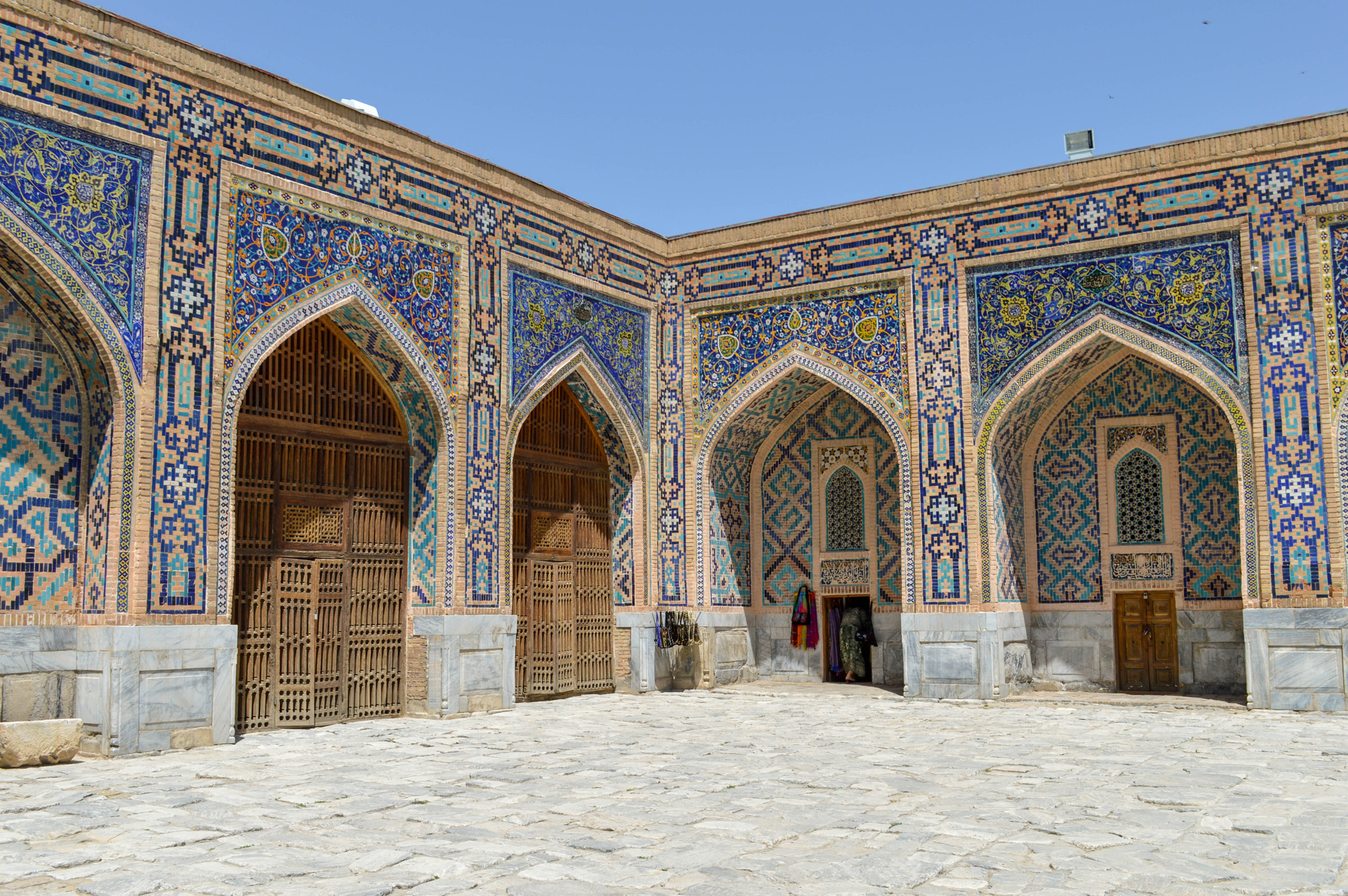
Classroom entrances

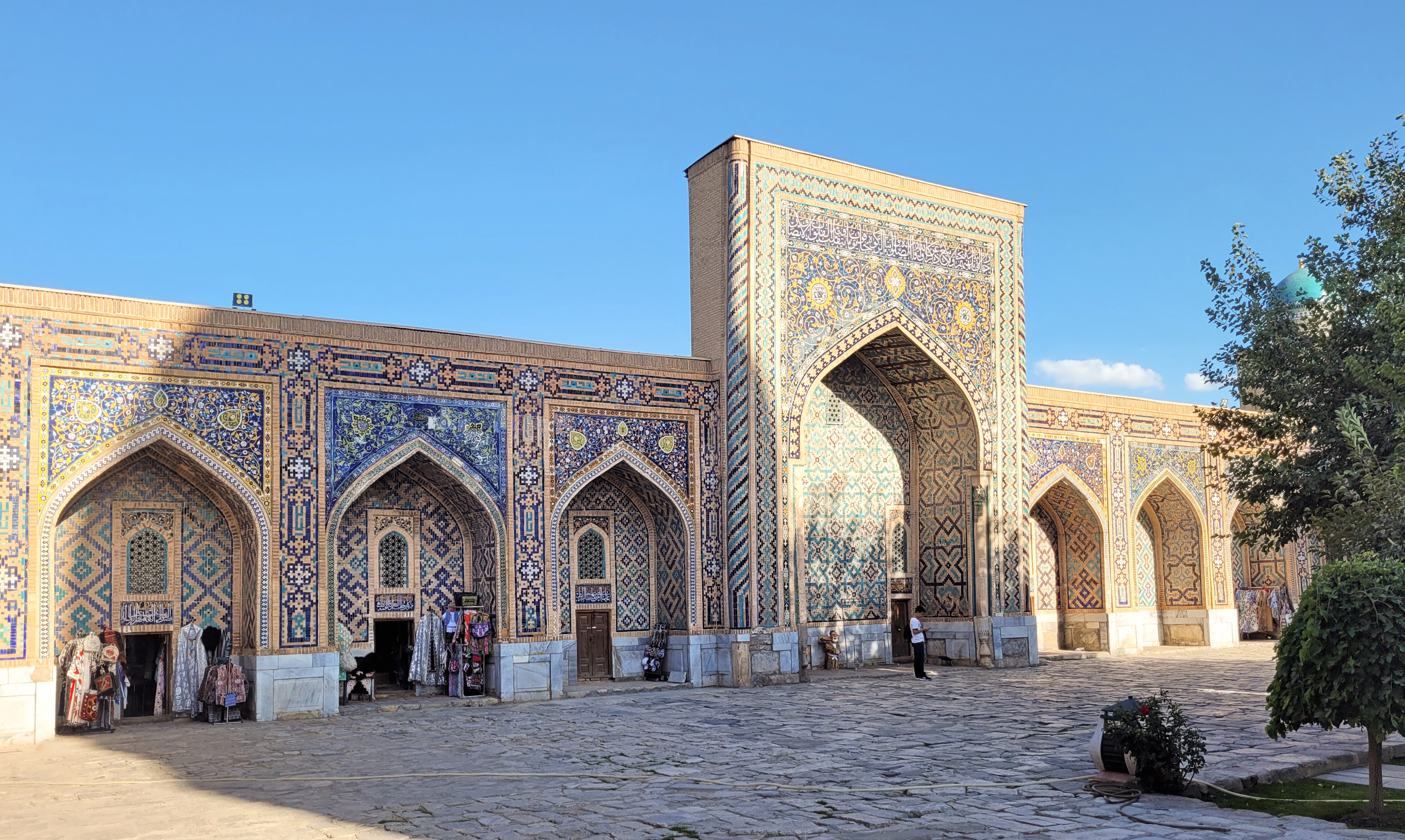
Inner courtyard iwan

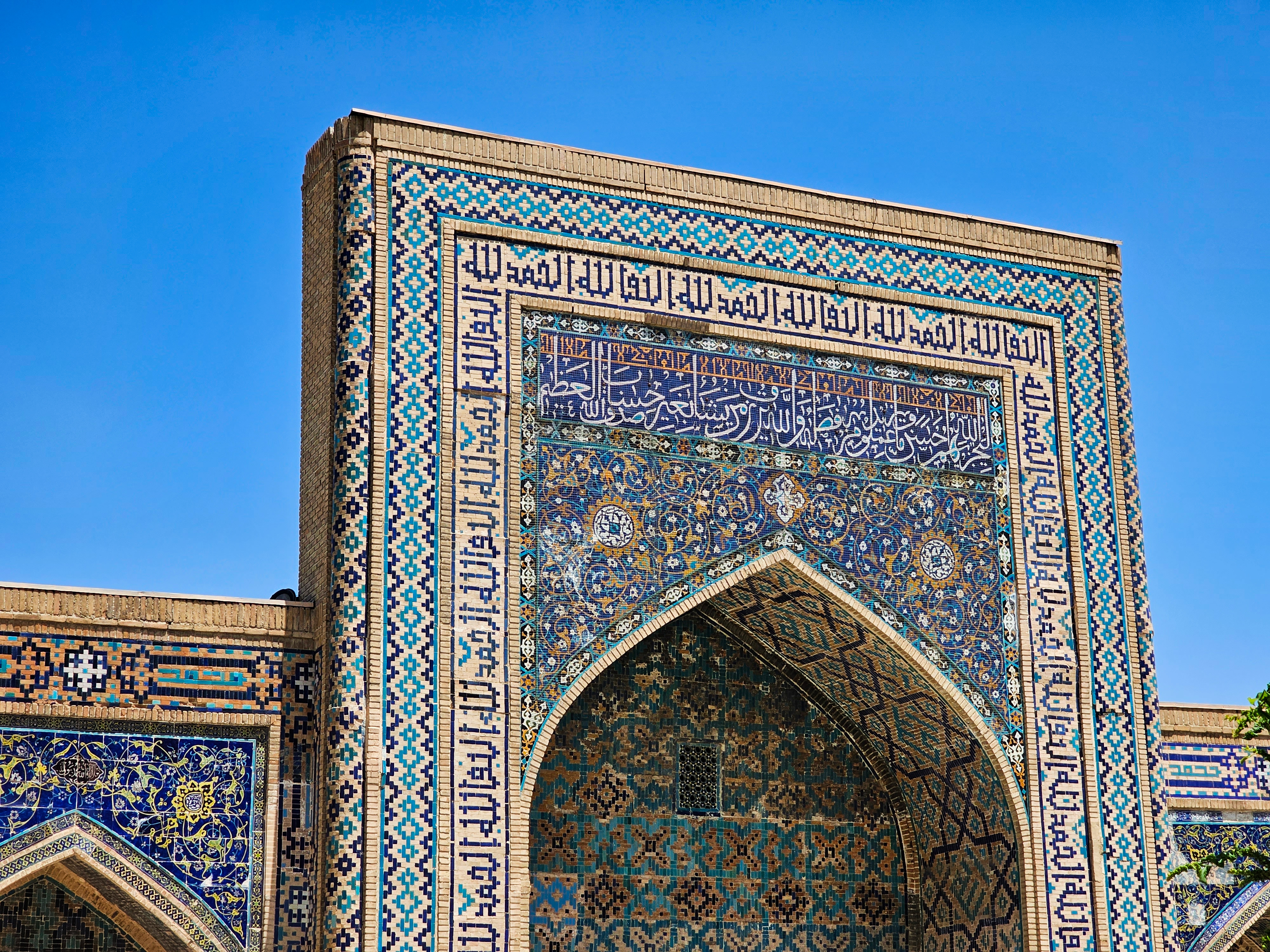
Decoration and calligraphy of a courtyard iwan

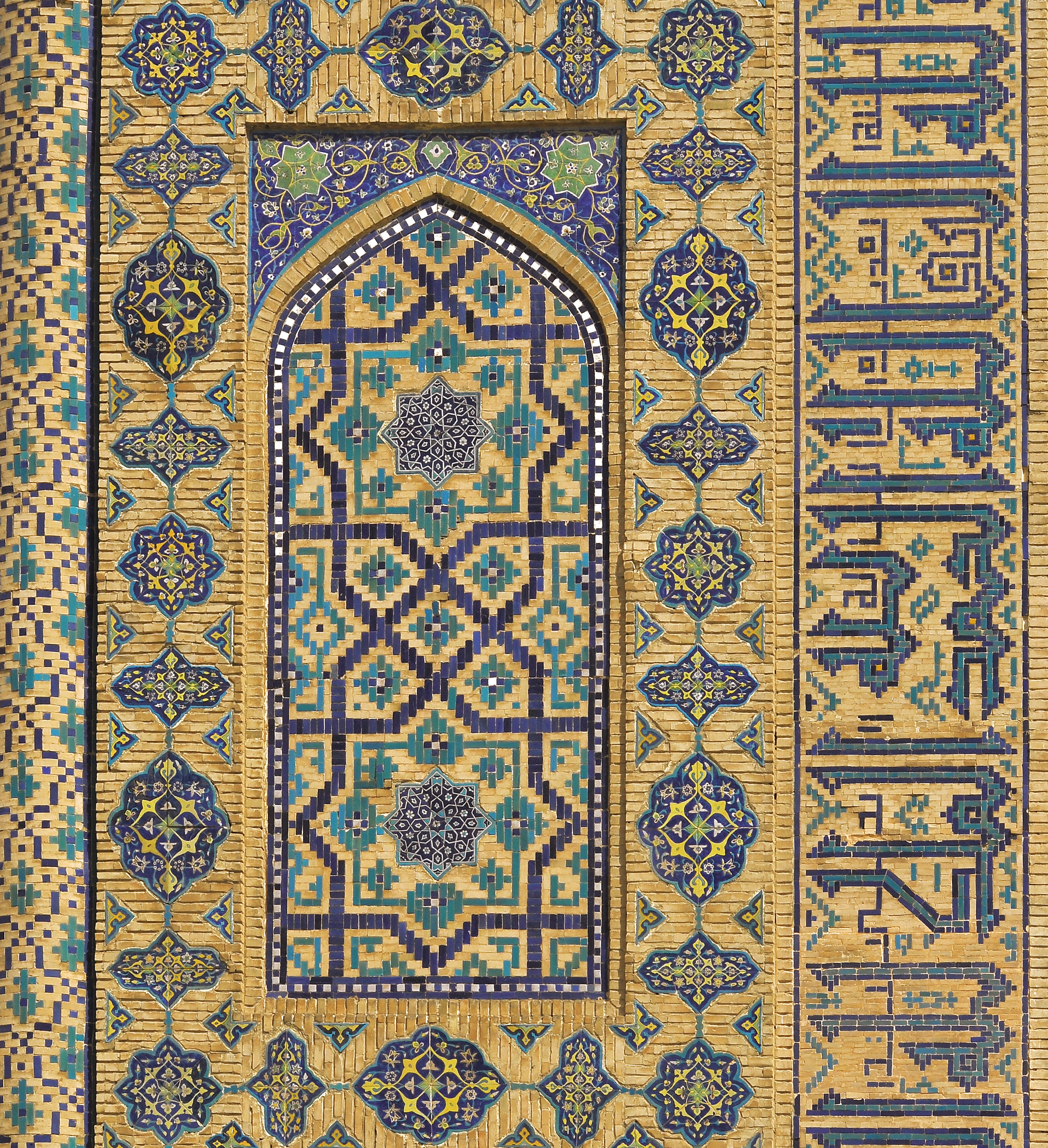
Banna'i decorative brickwork

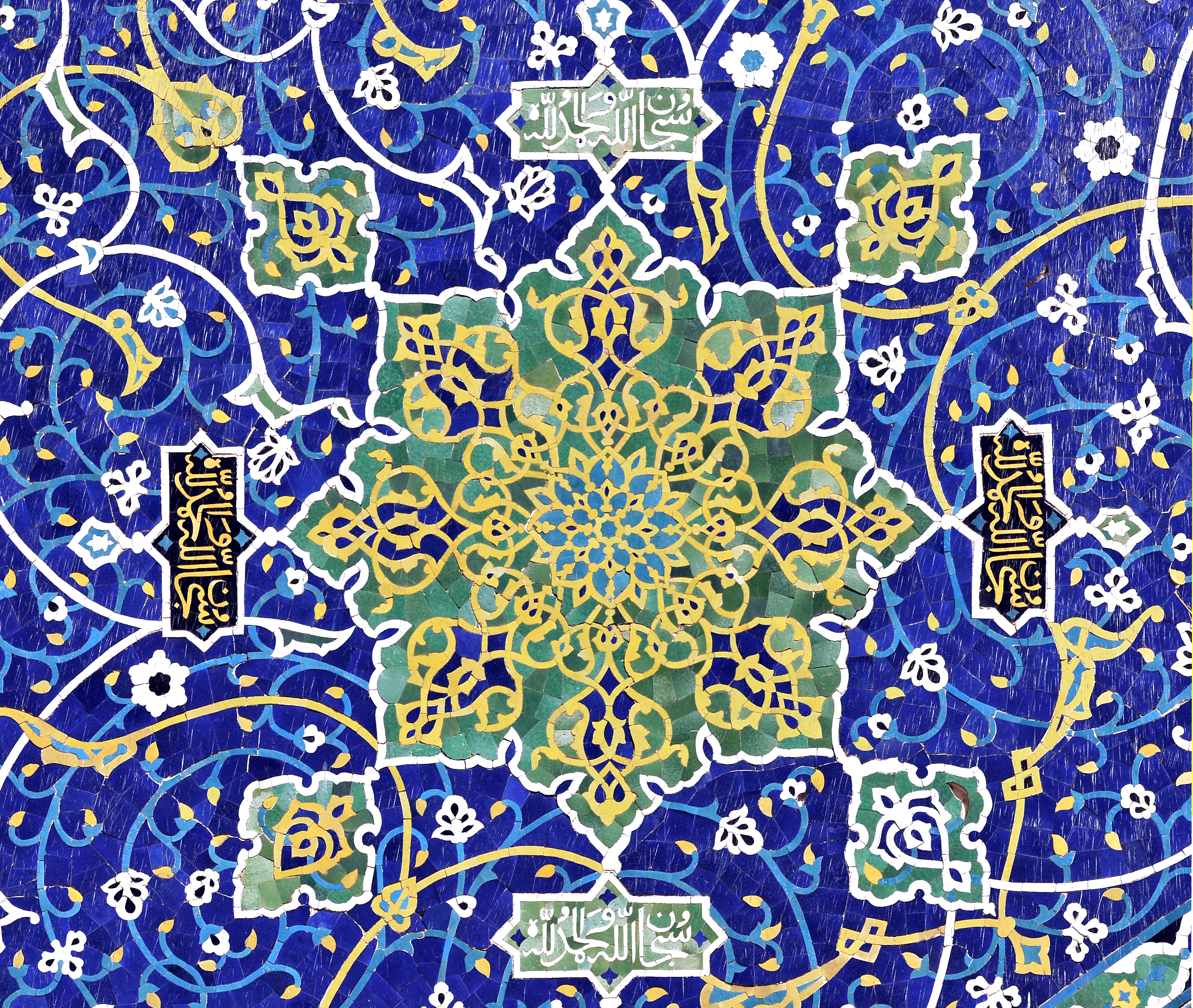
Decoration on the main Iwan

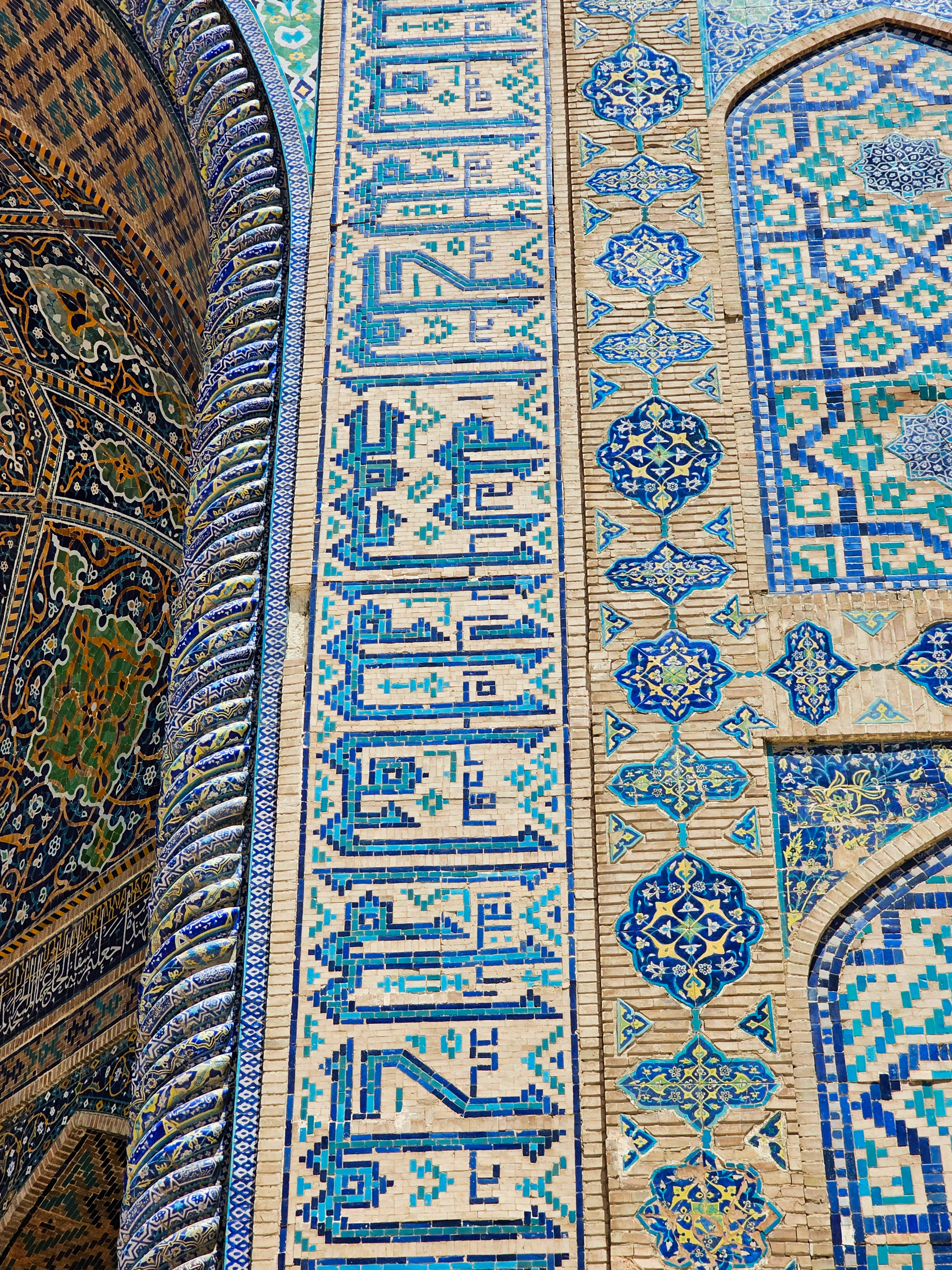
Brick calligraphy
Interior

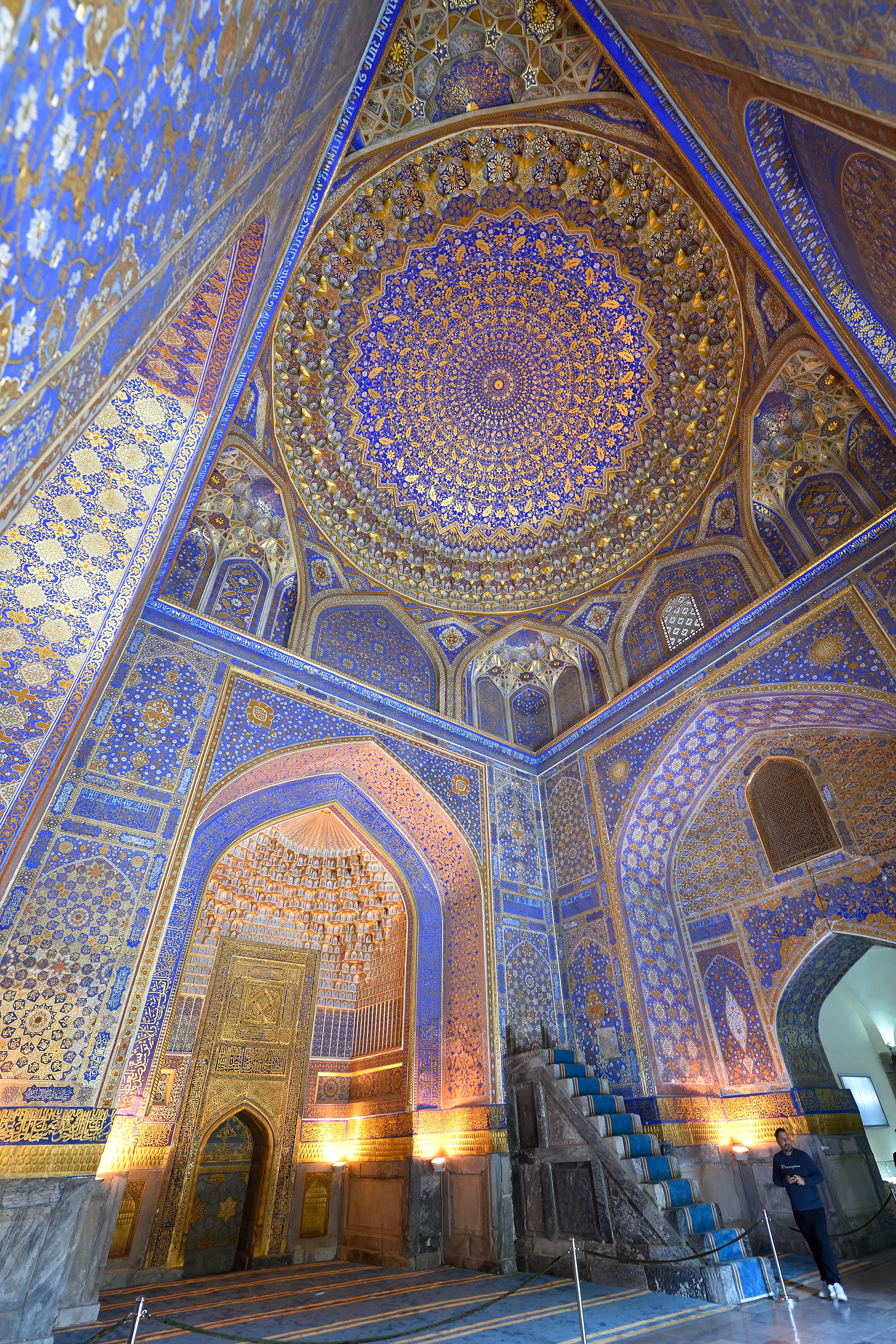
Interior

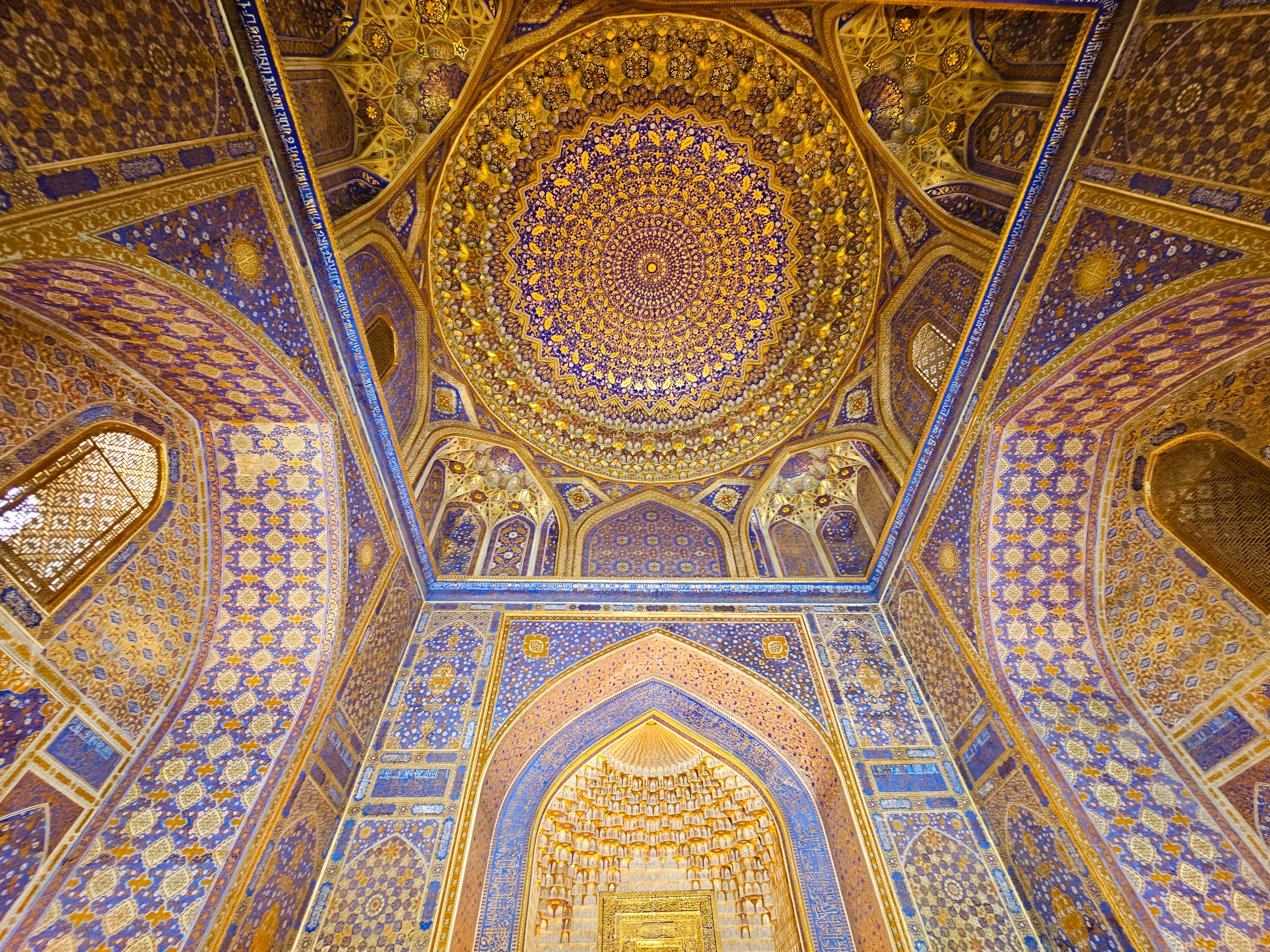
Ceiling

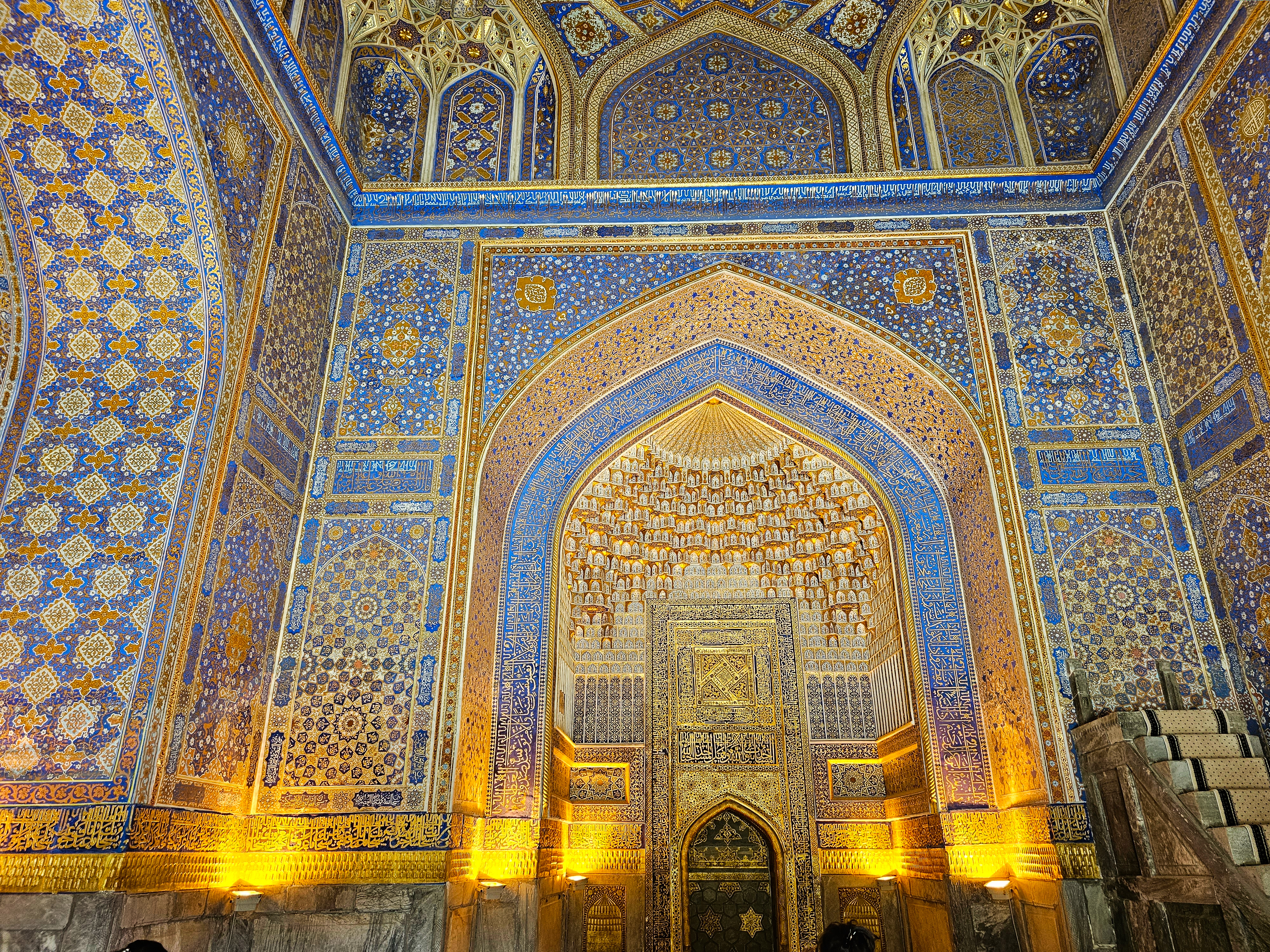
Front view

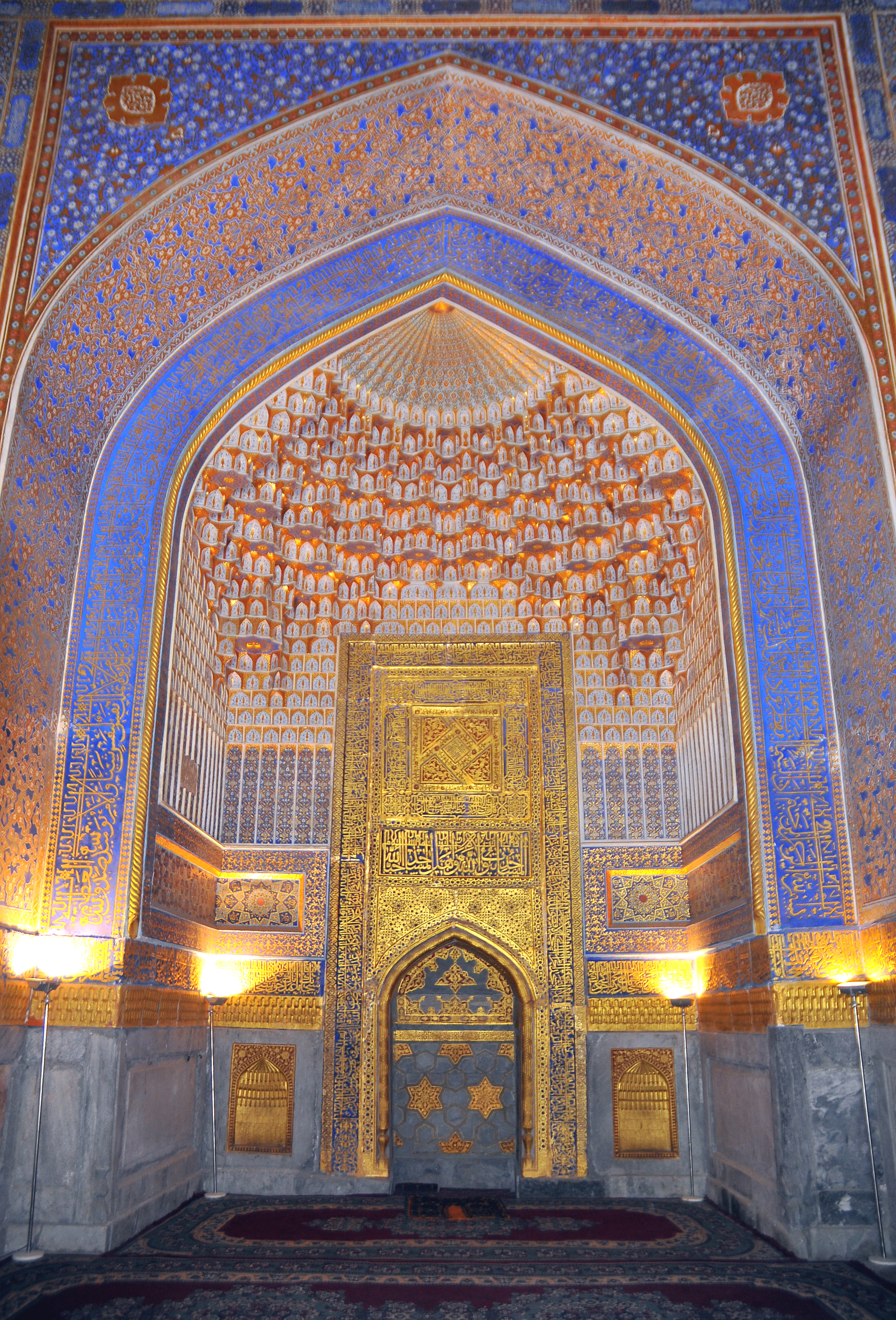
Mihrab

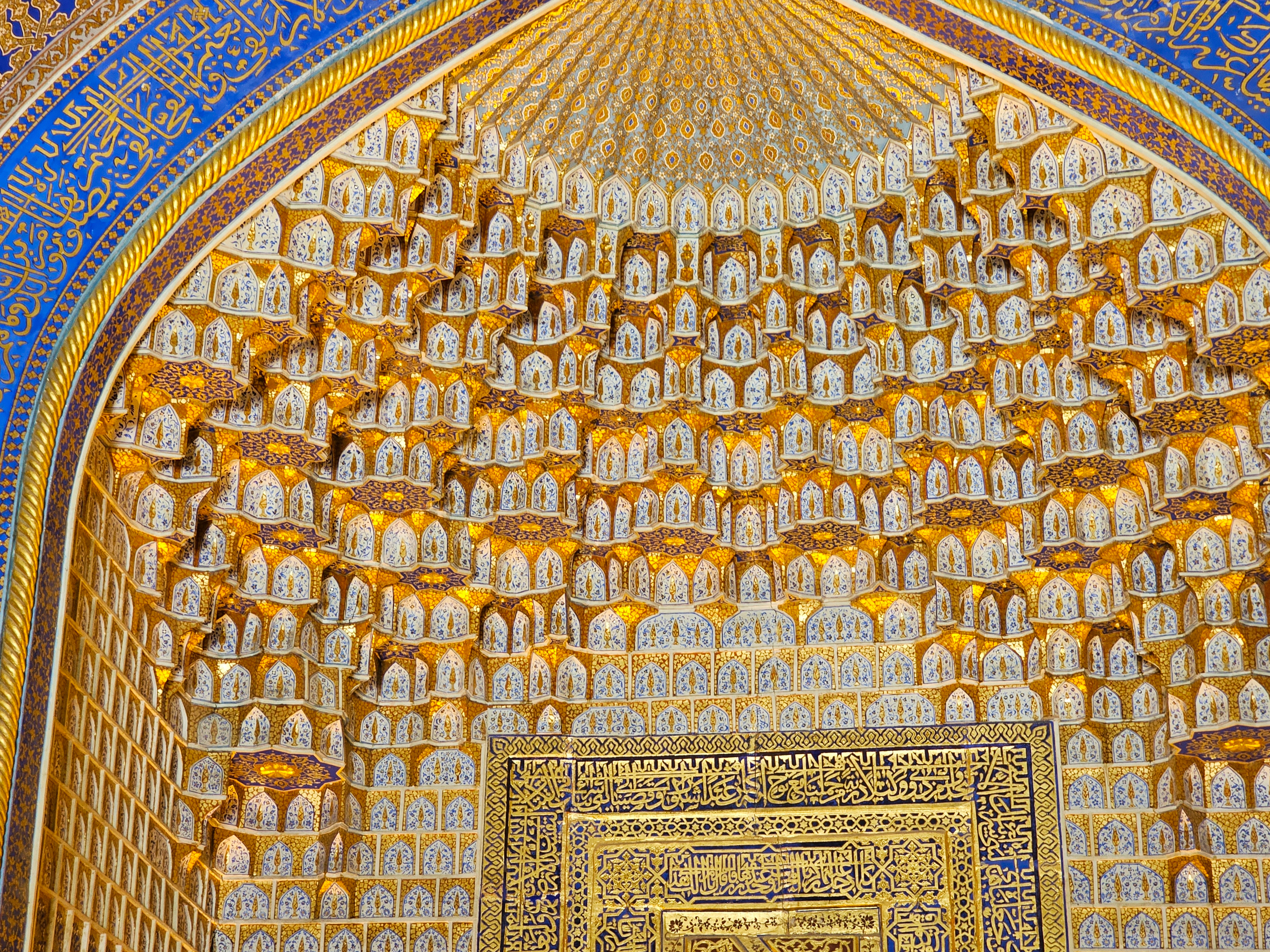
Muqarnas

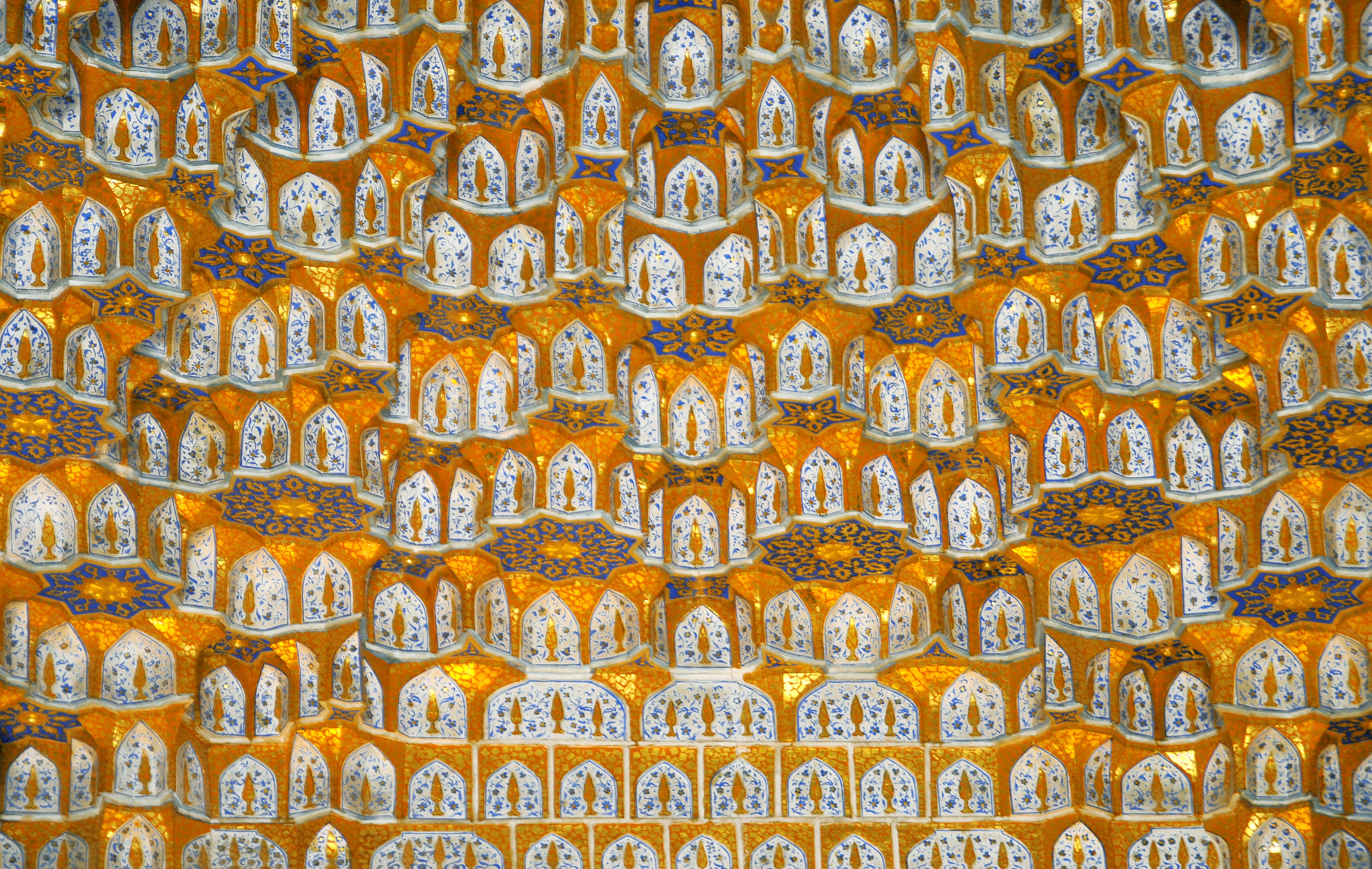
Muqarnas of the mihrab

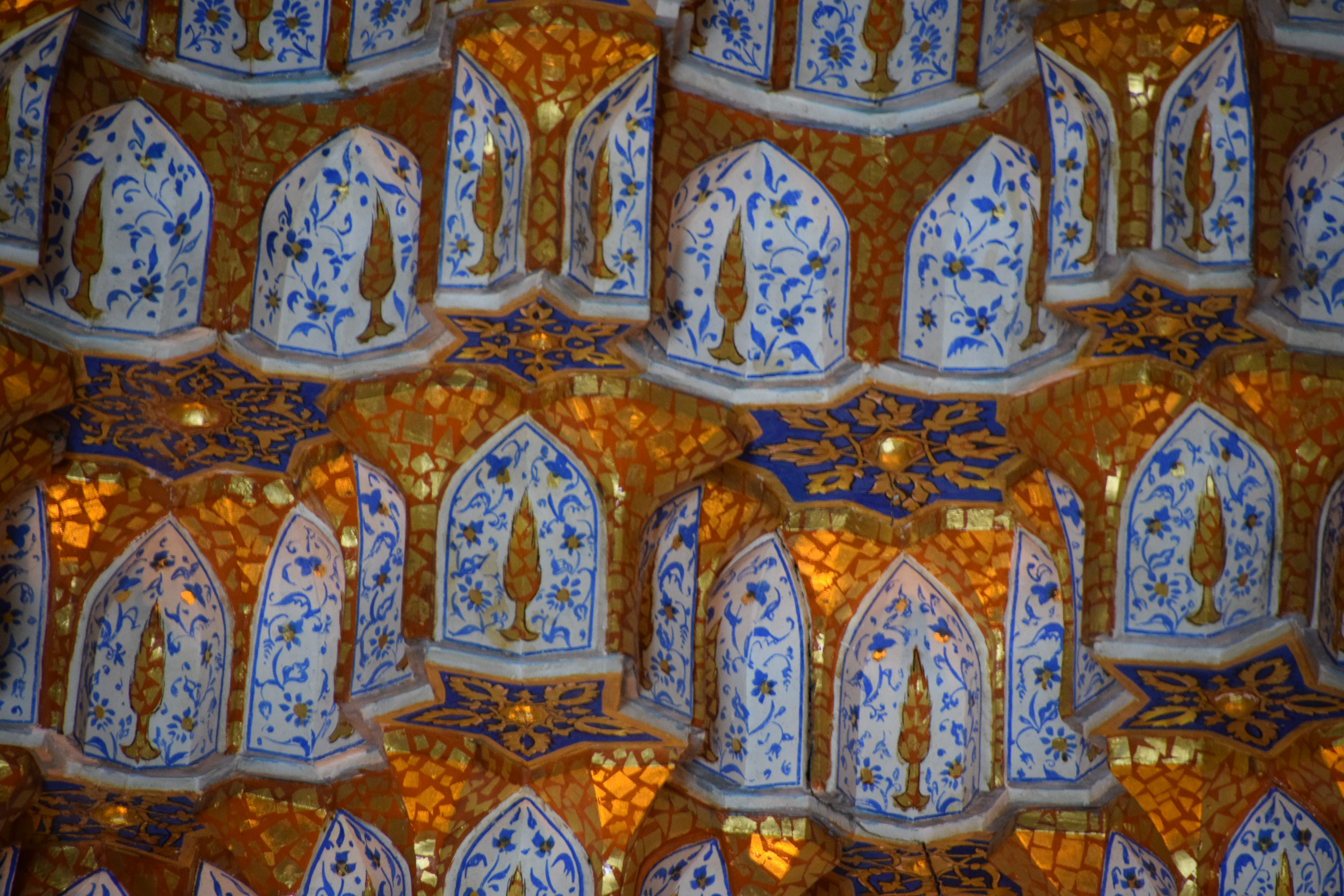
Muqarnas

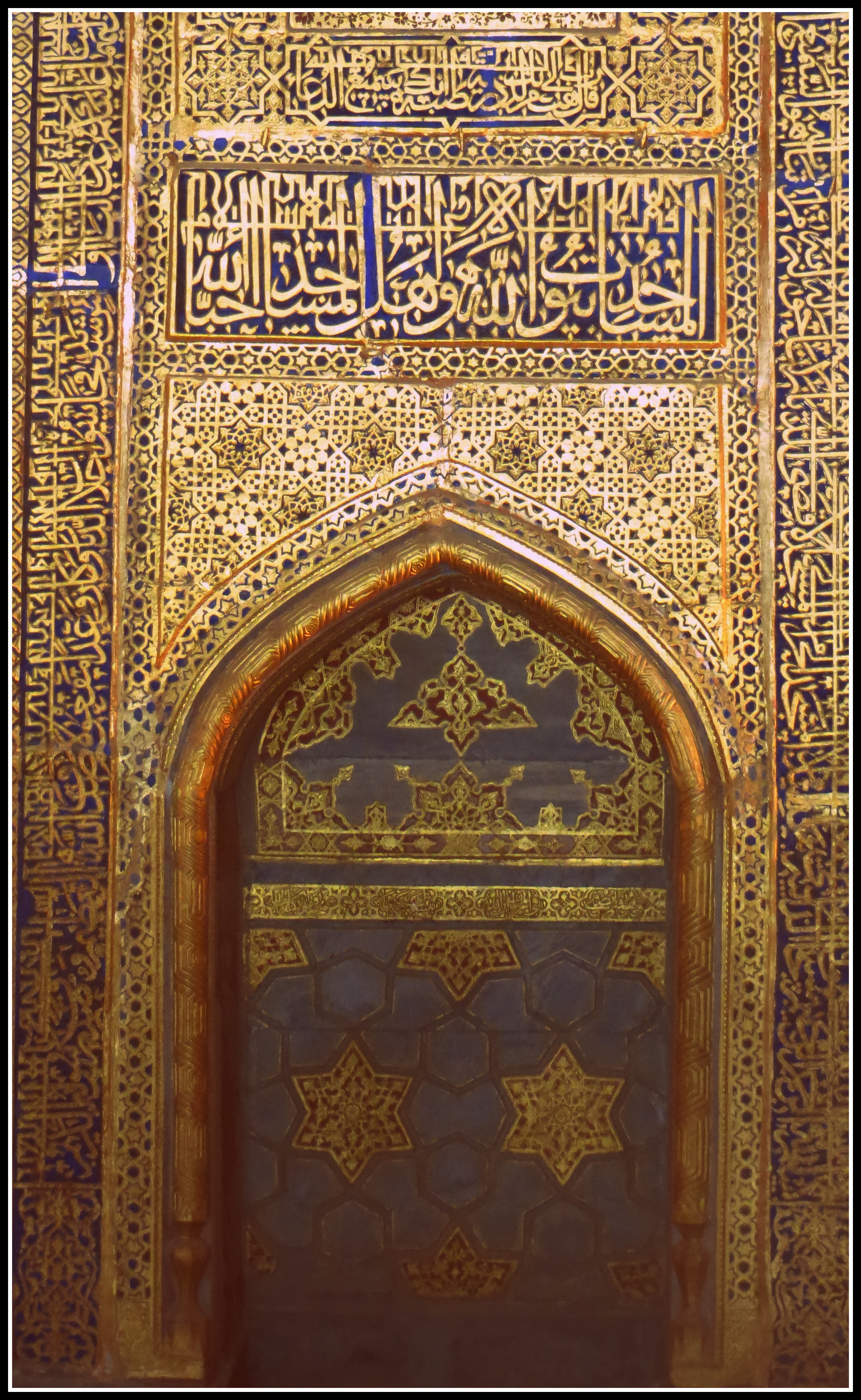
Decoration of mihrab

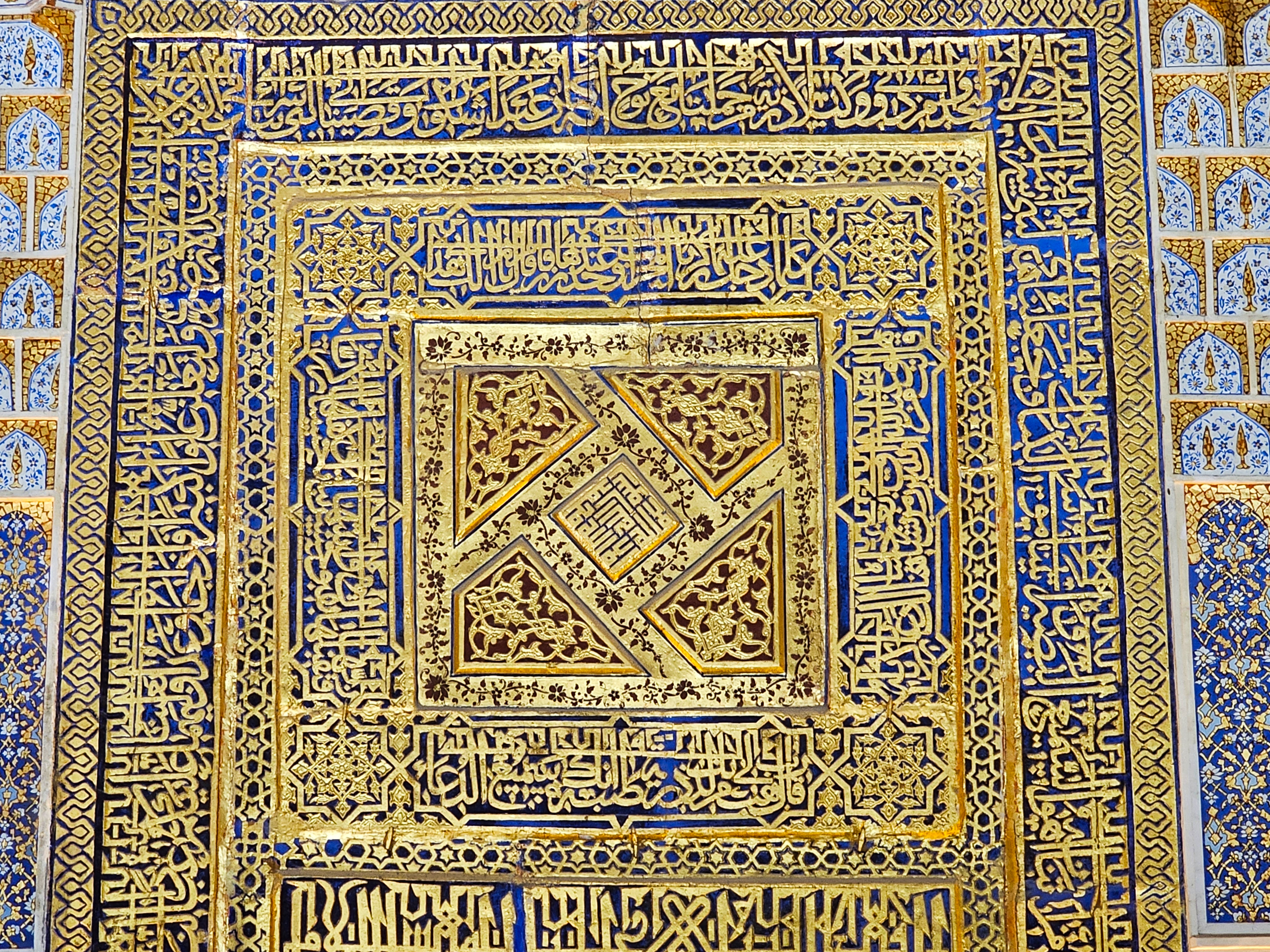
Detailed calligraphy of the mihrab

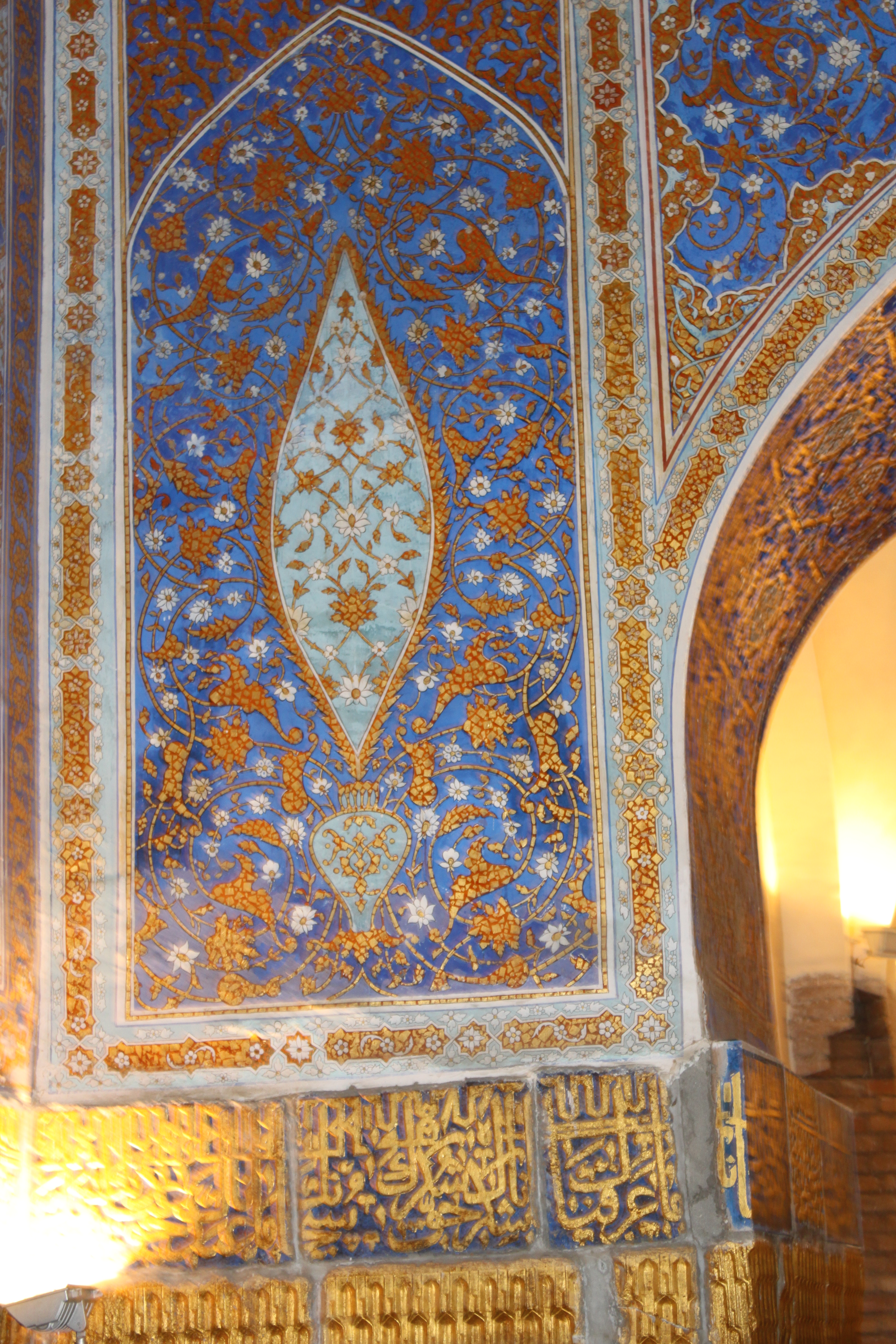
Floral arabesques

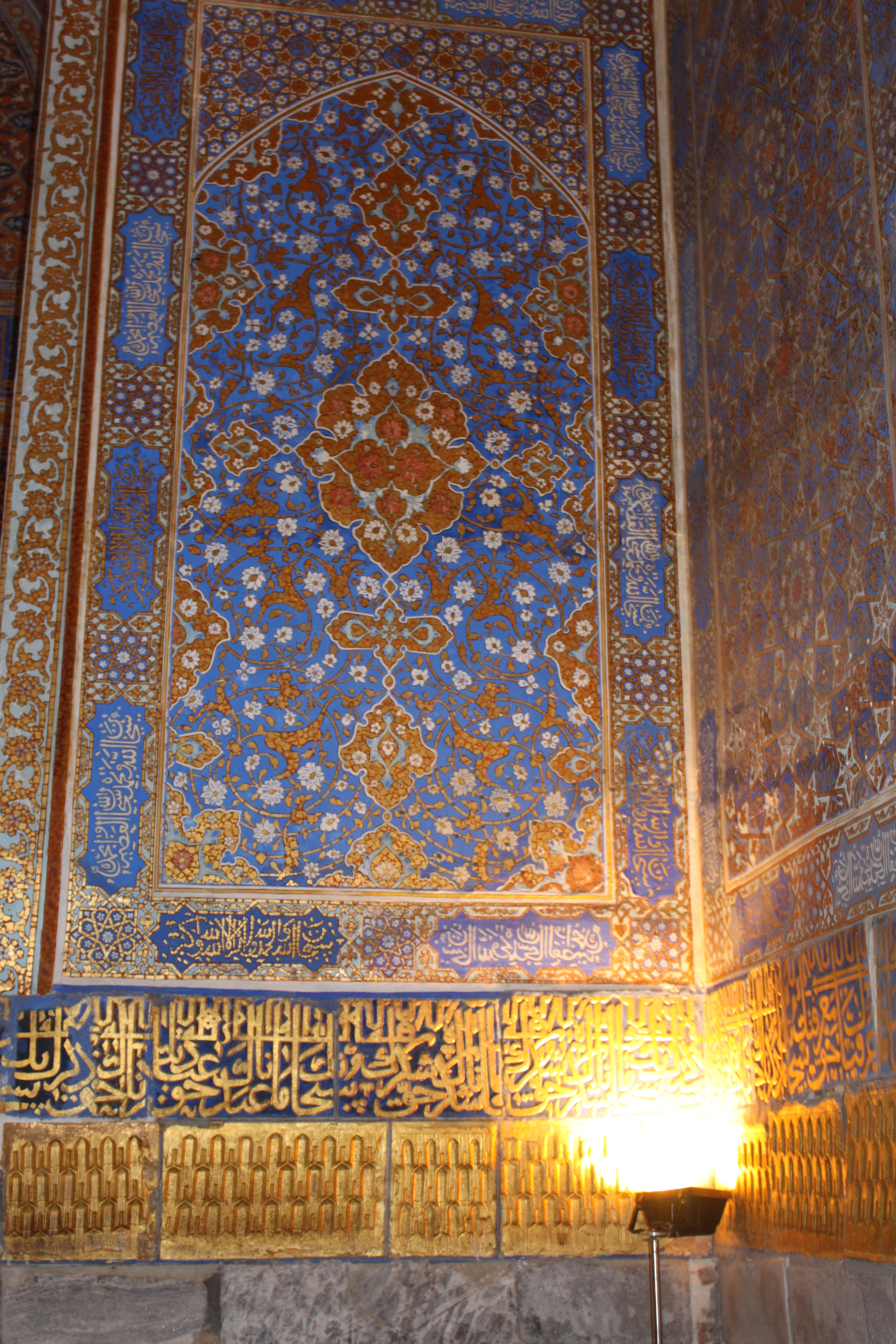

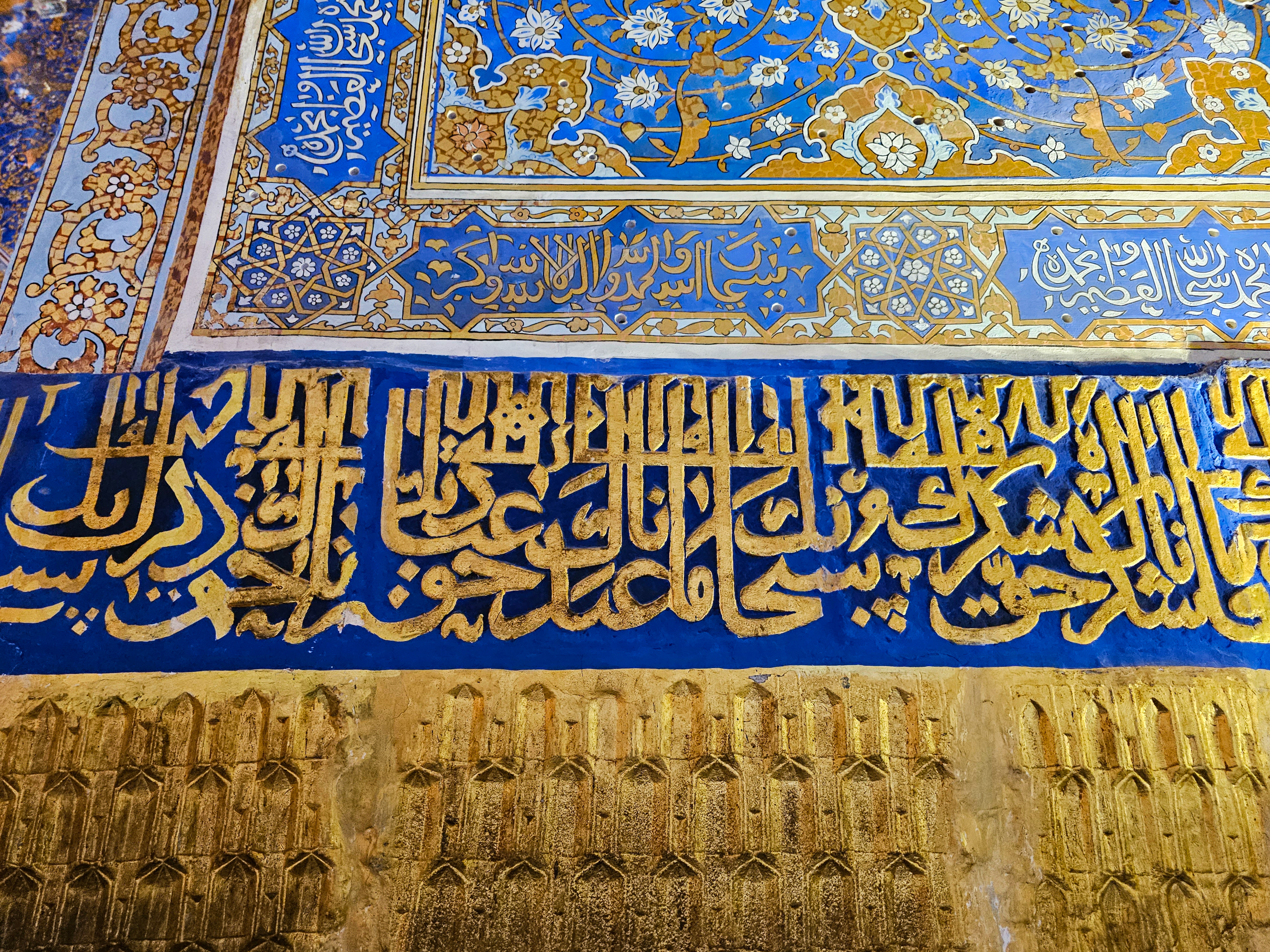
Calligraphy

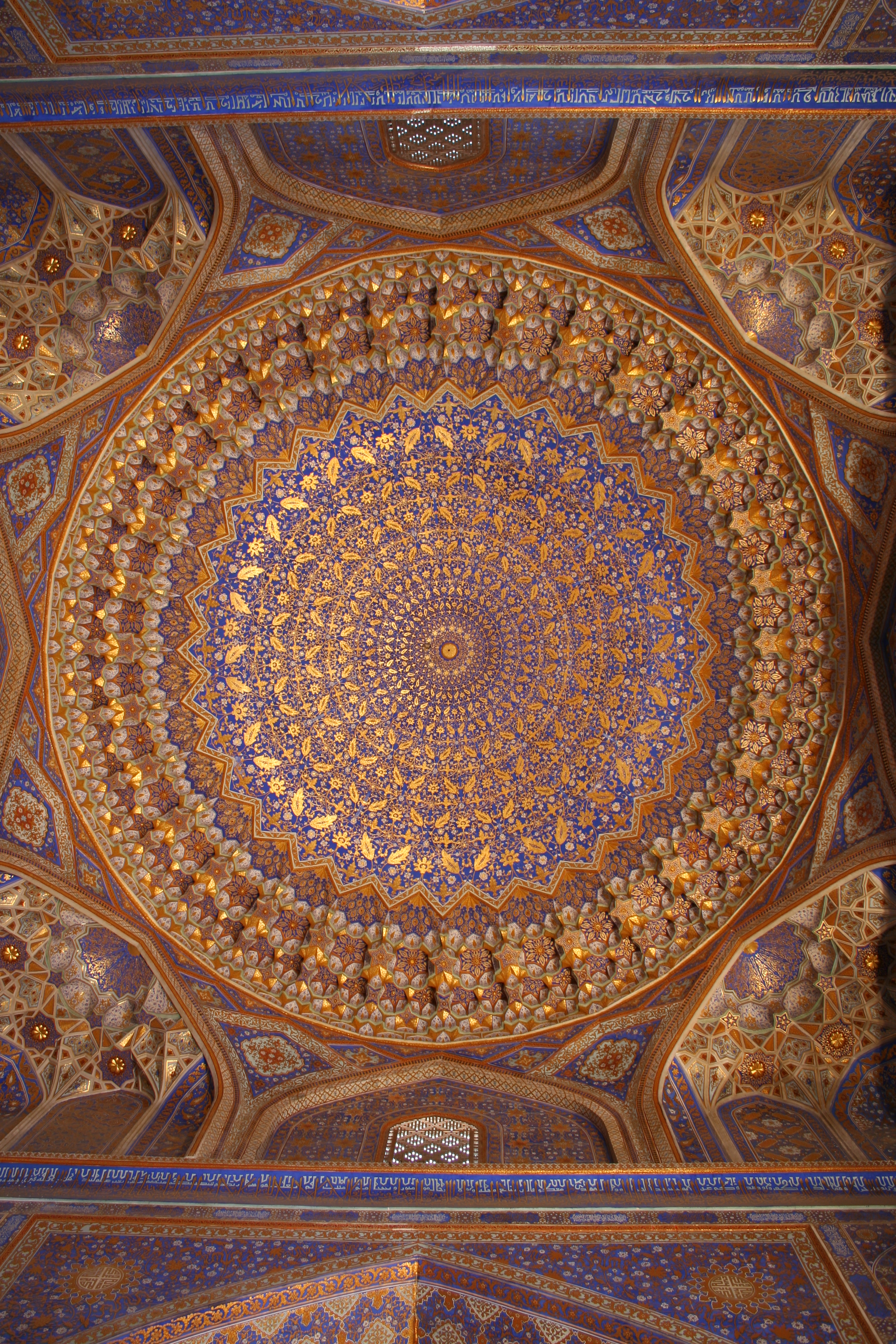
Interior decoration of the dome

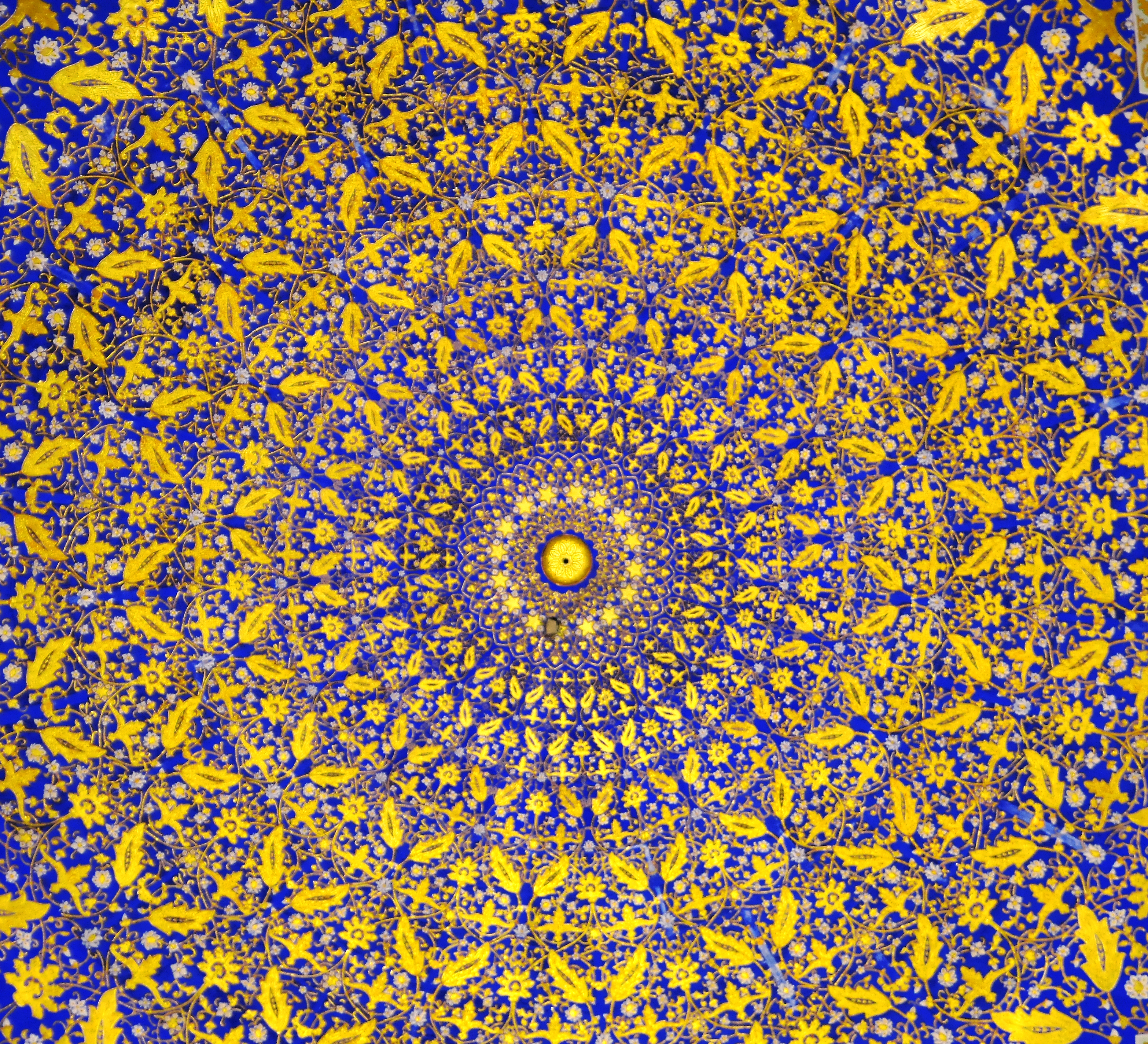
Detailed decoration of the dome

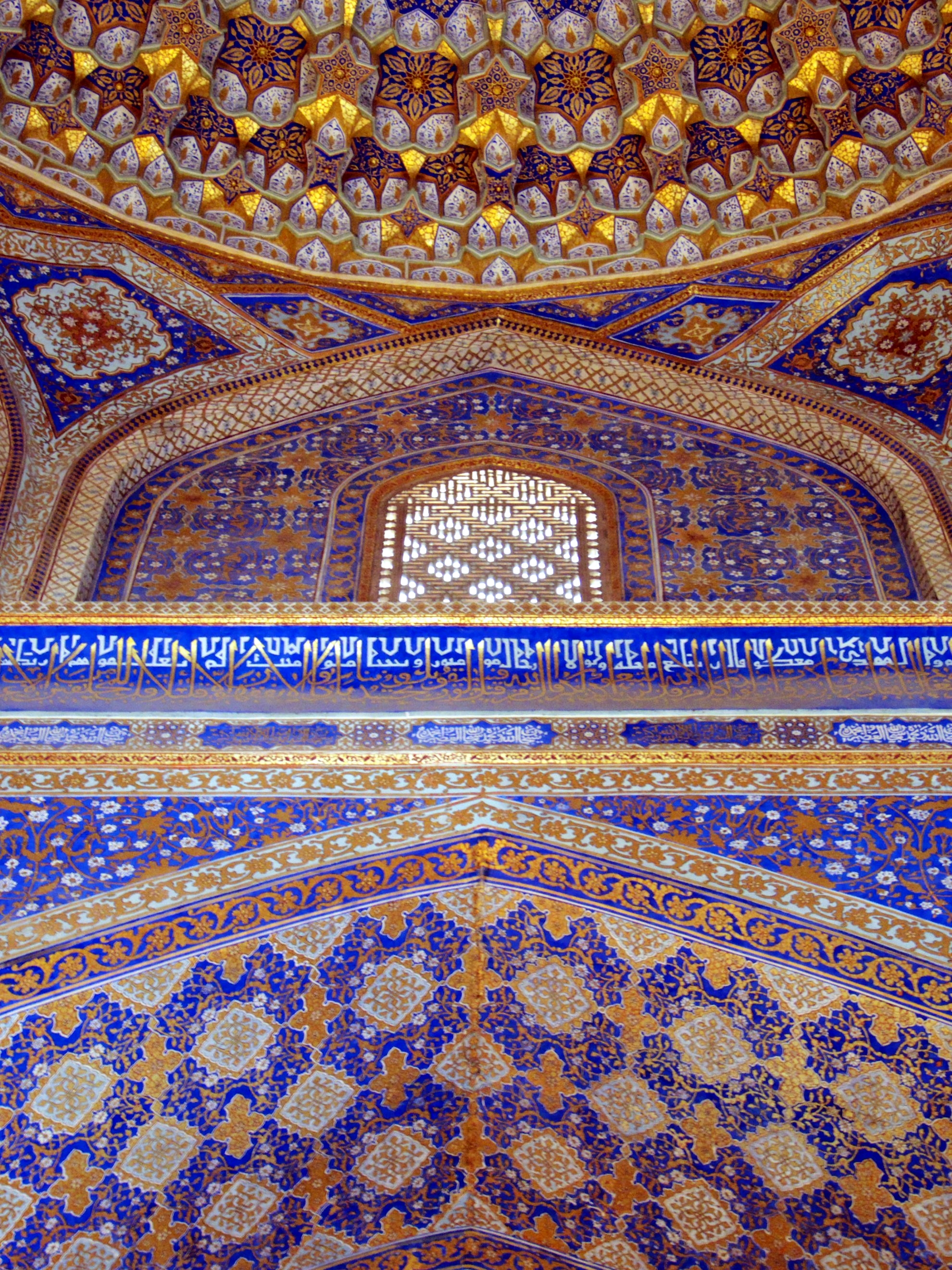
Upper window

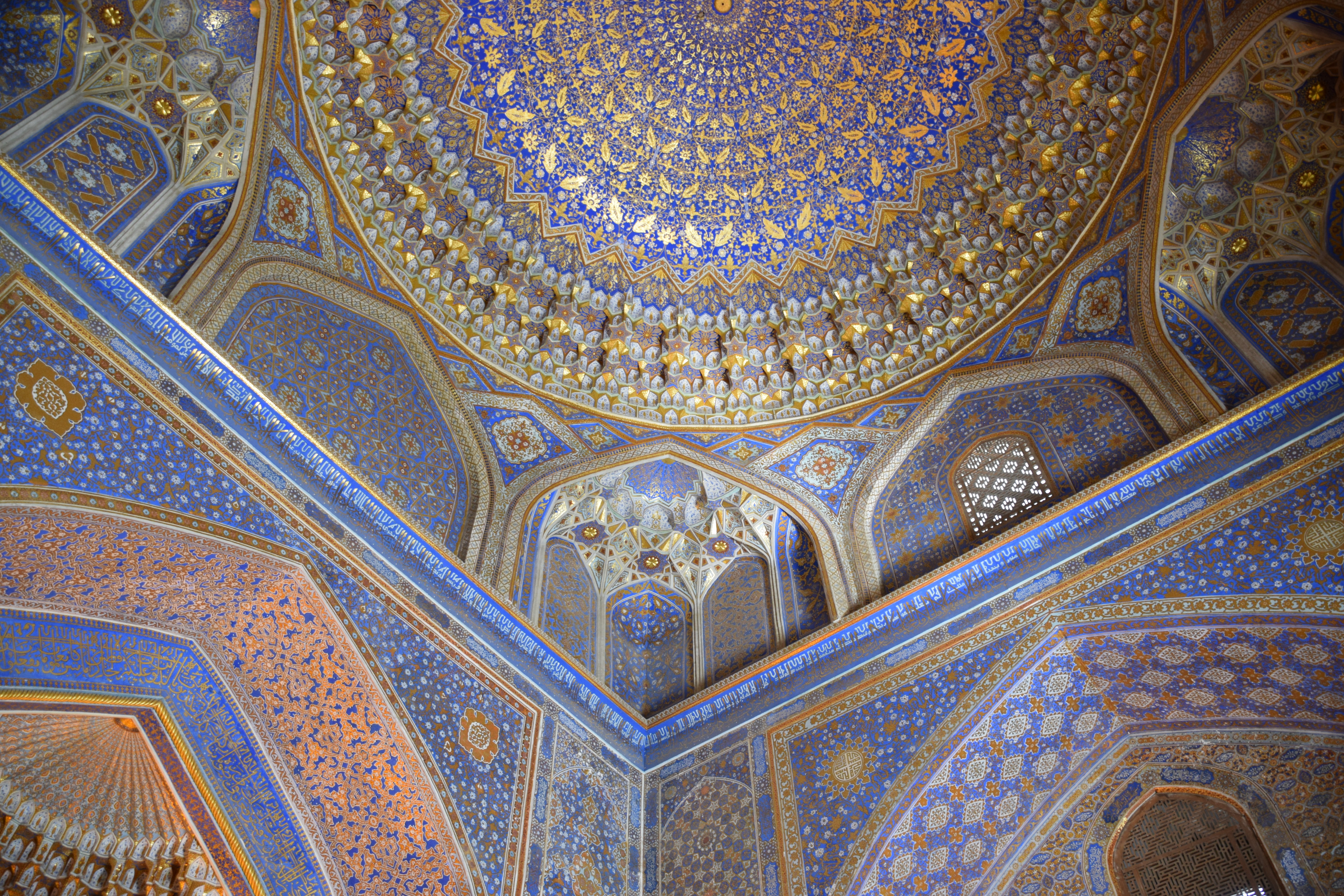
Squinch transition

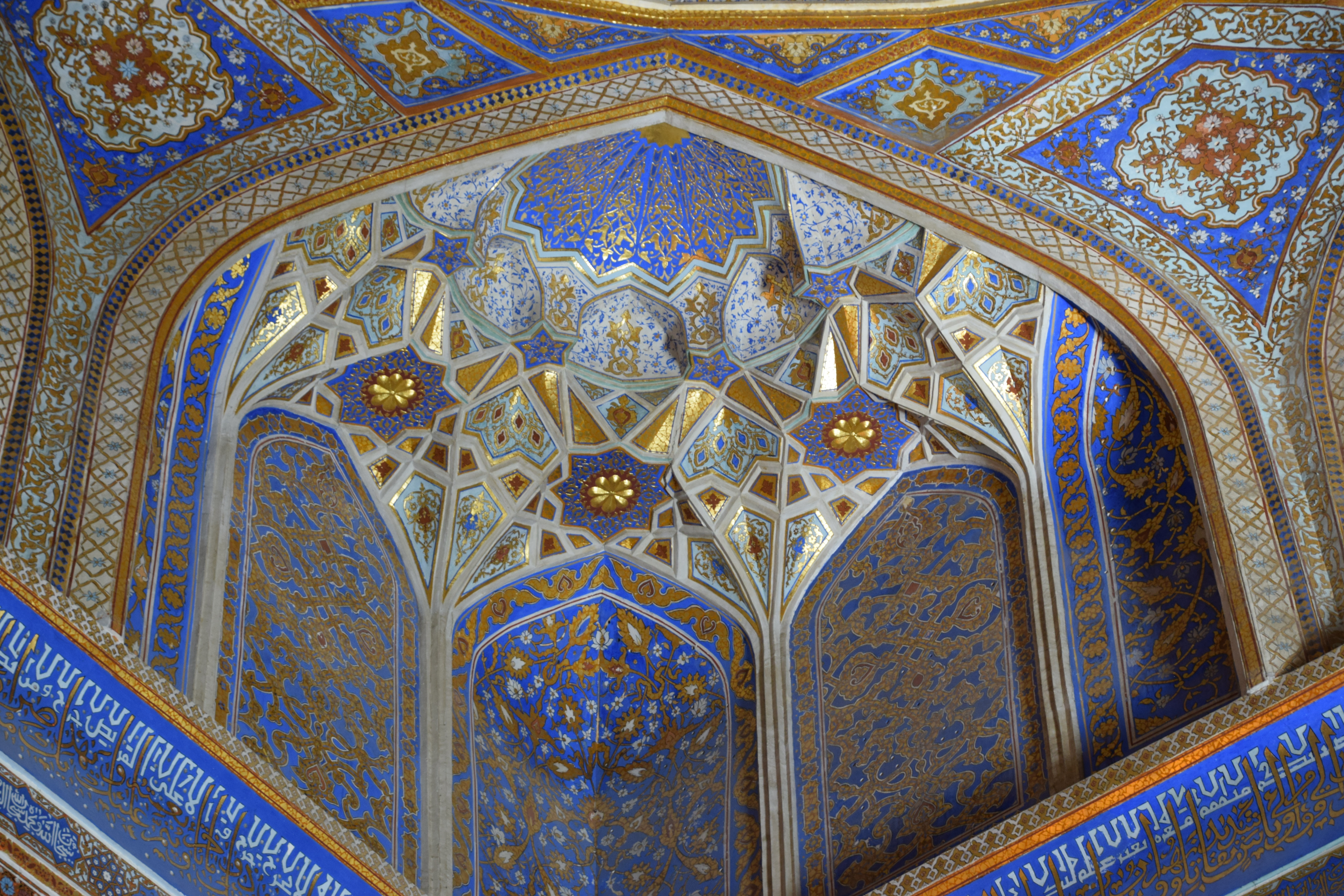
Muqarnas in the squinch

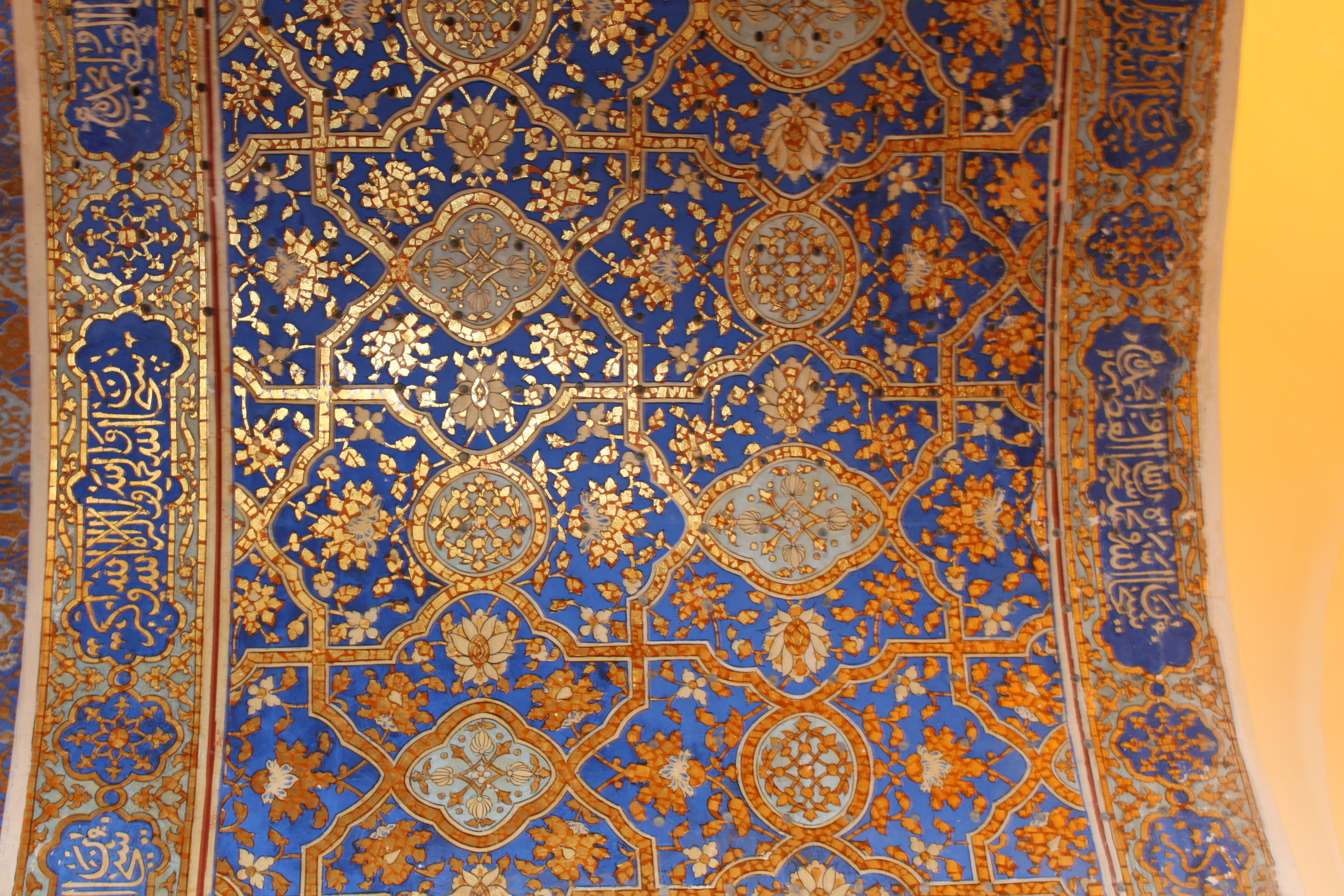
Decoration of a vault

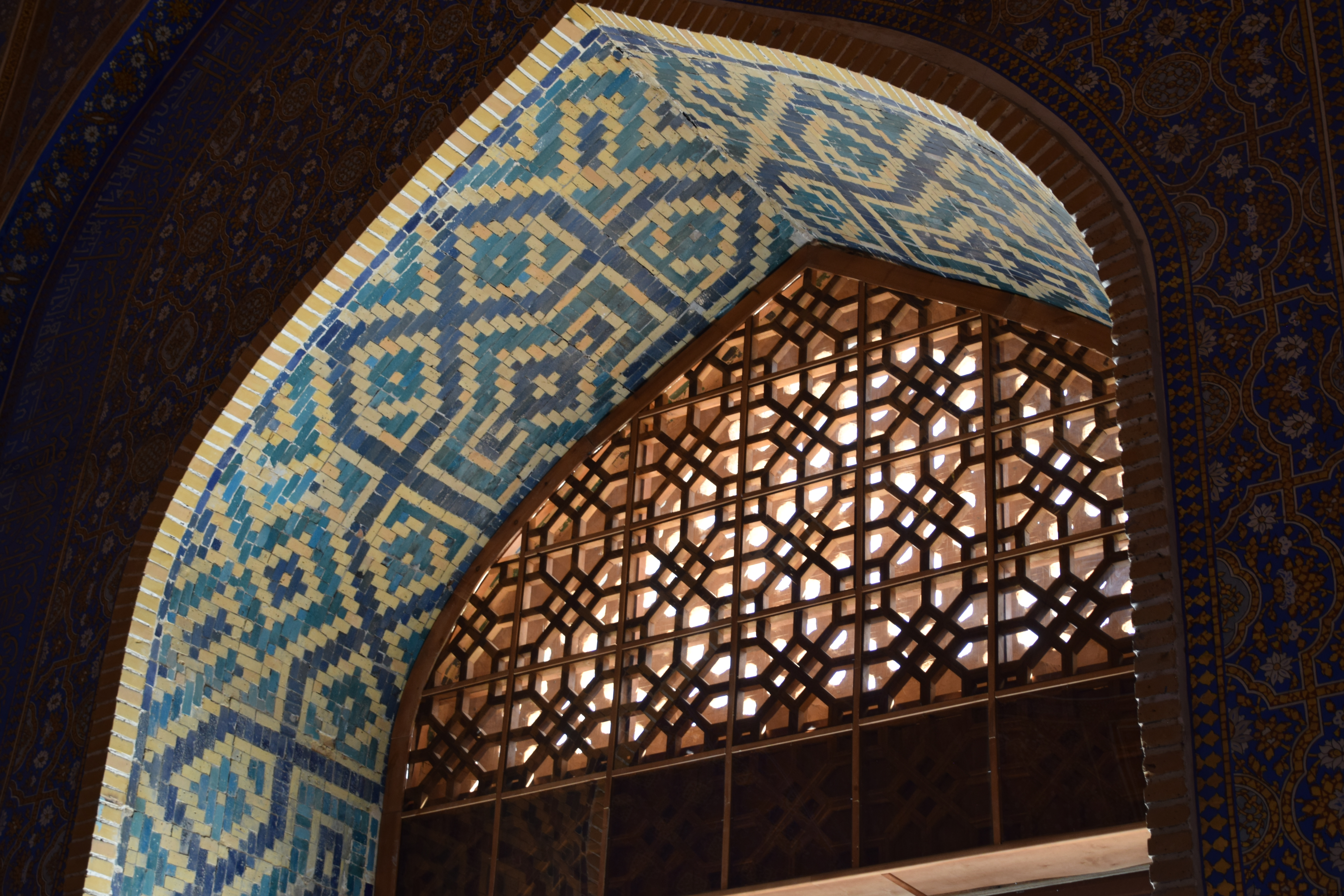
Window

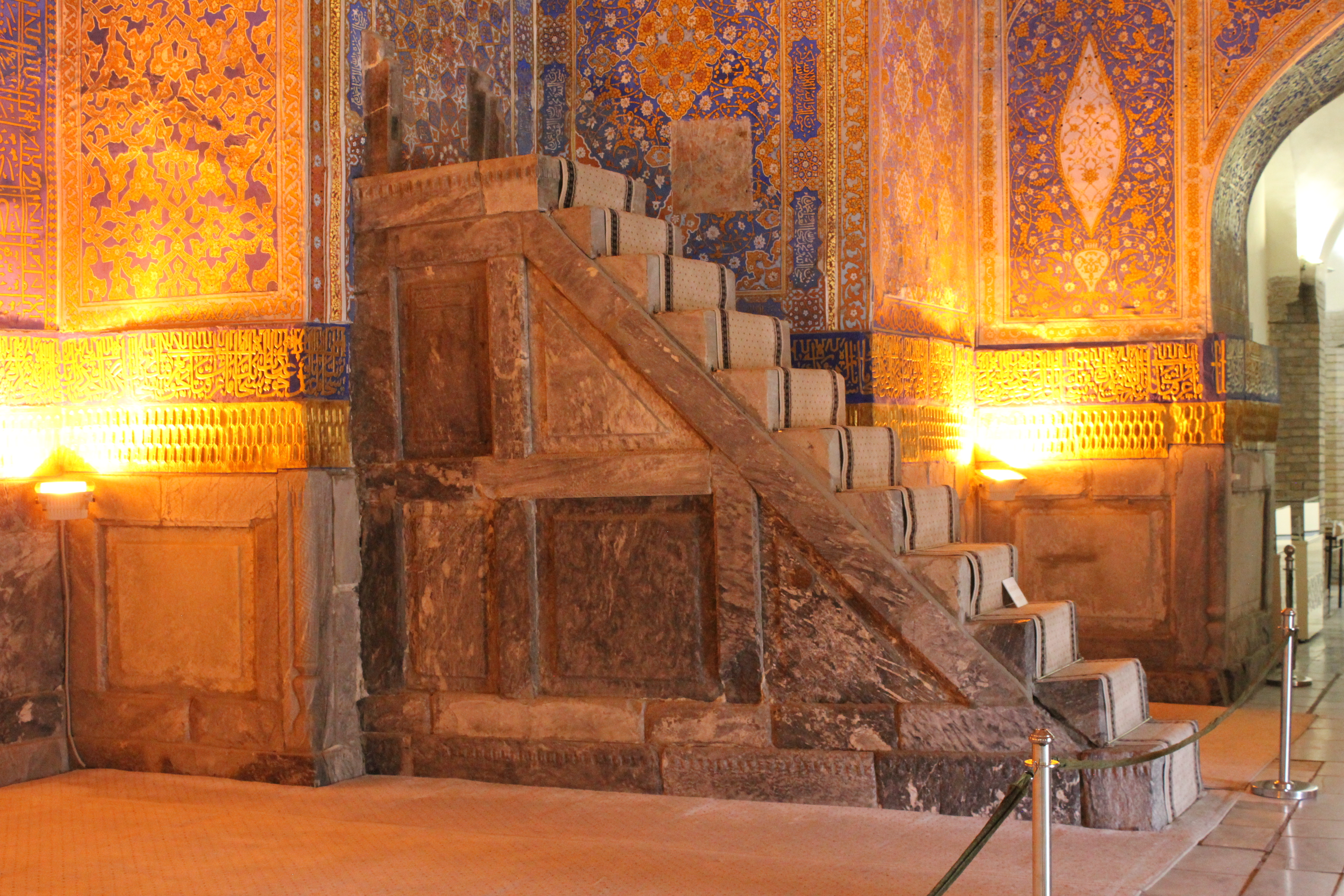
Minbar
Historical photographs

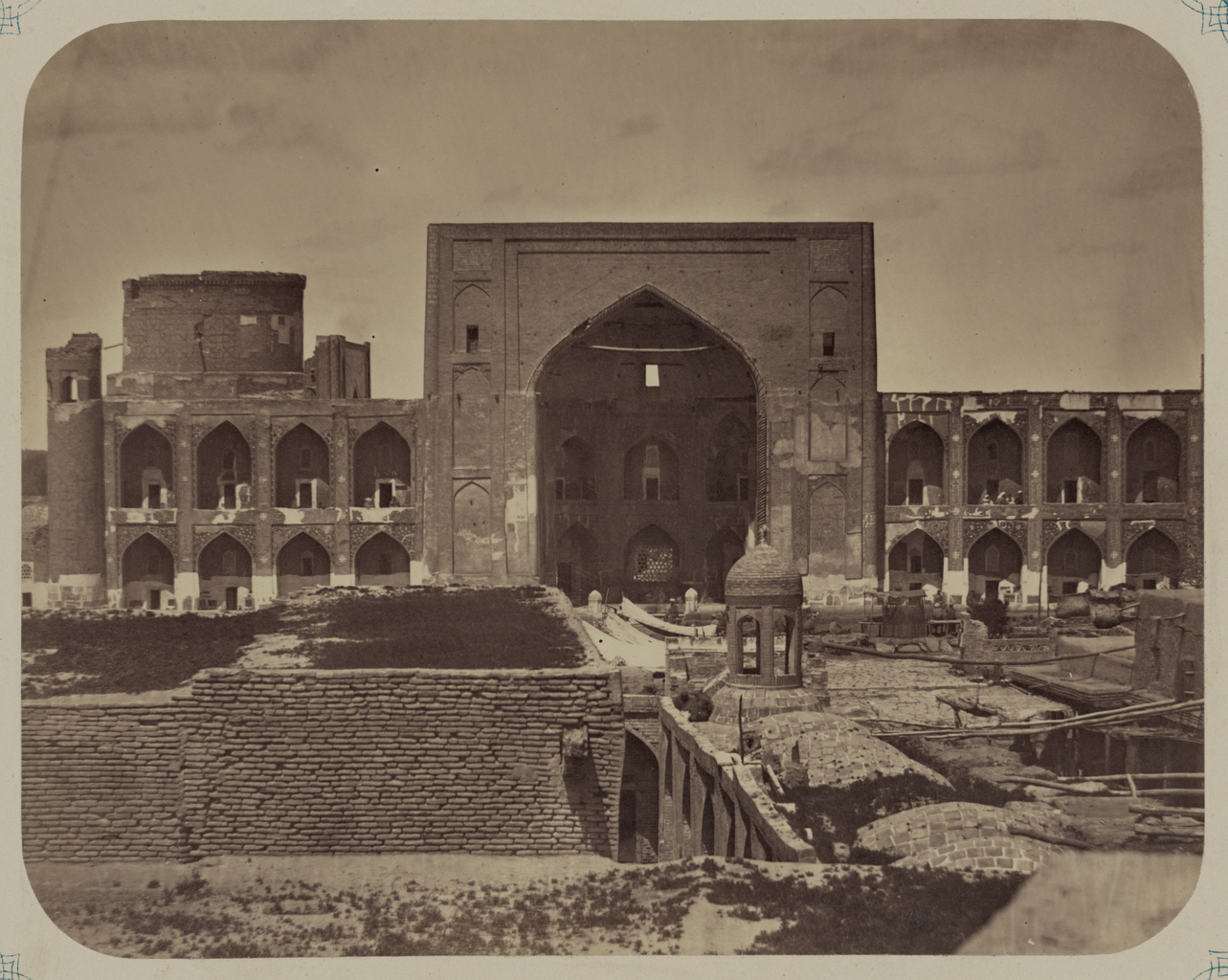
Main entrance (1868–1872)

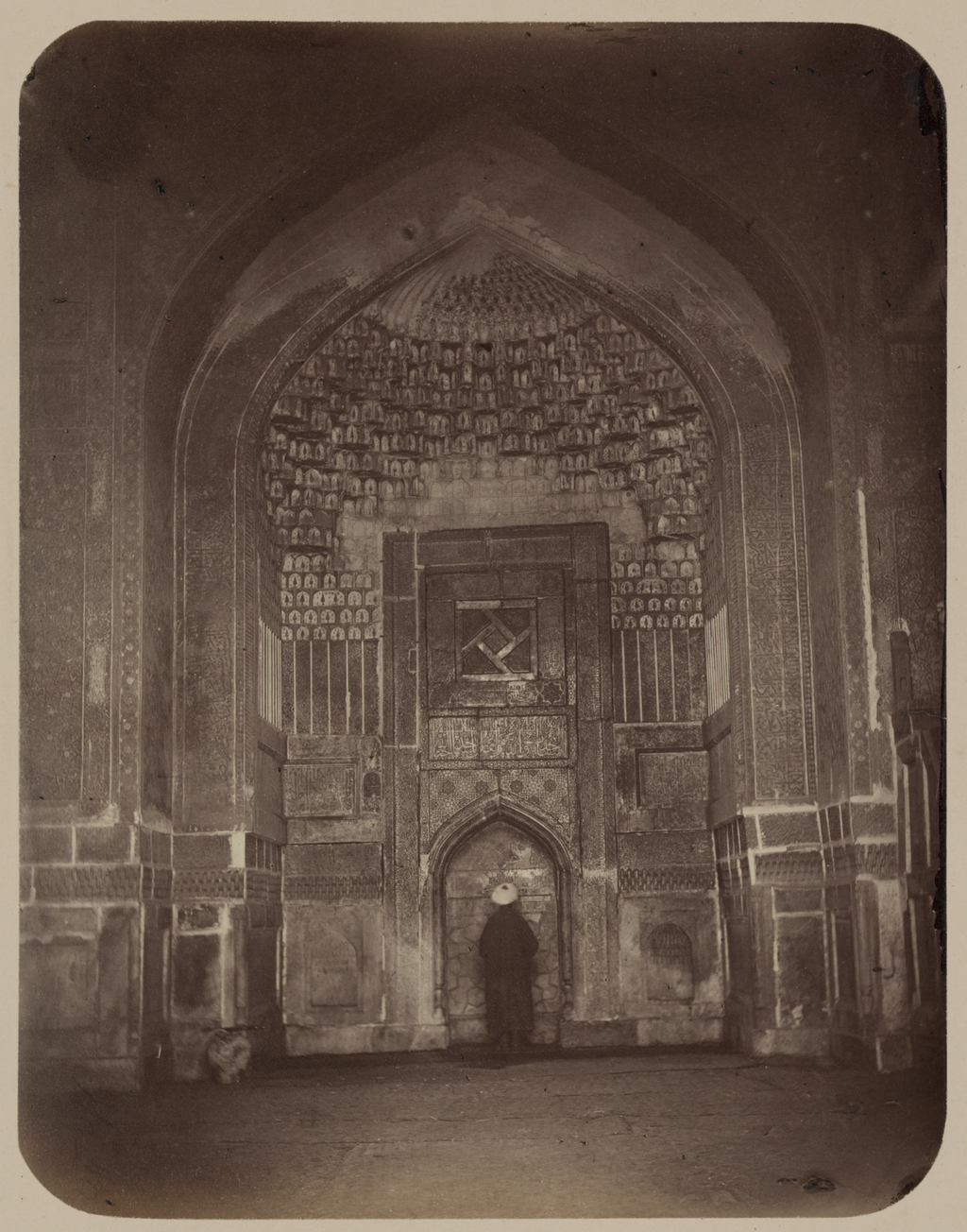
Mihrab (1868–1872)

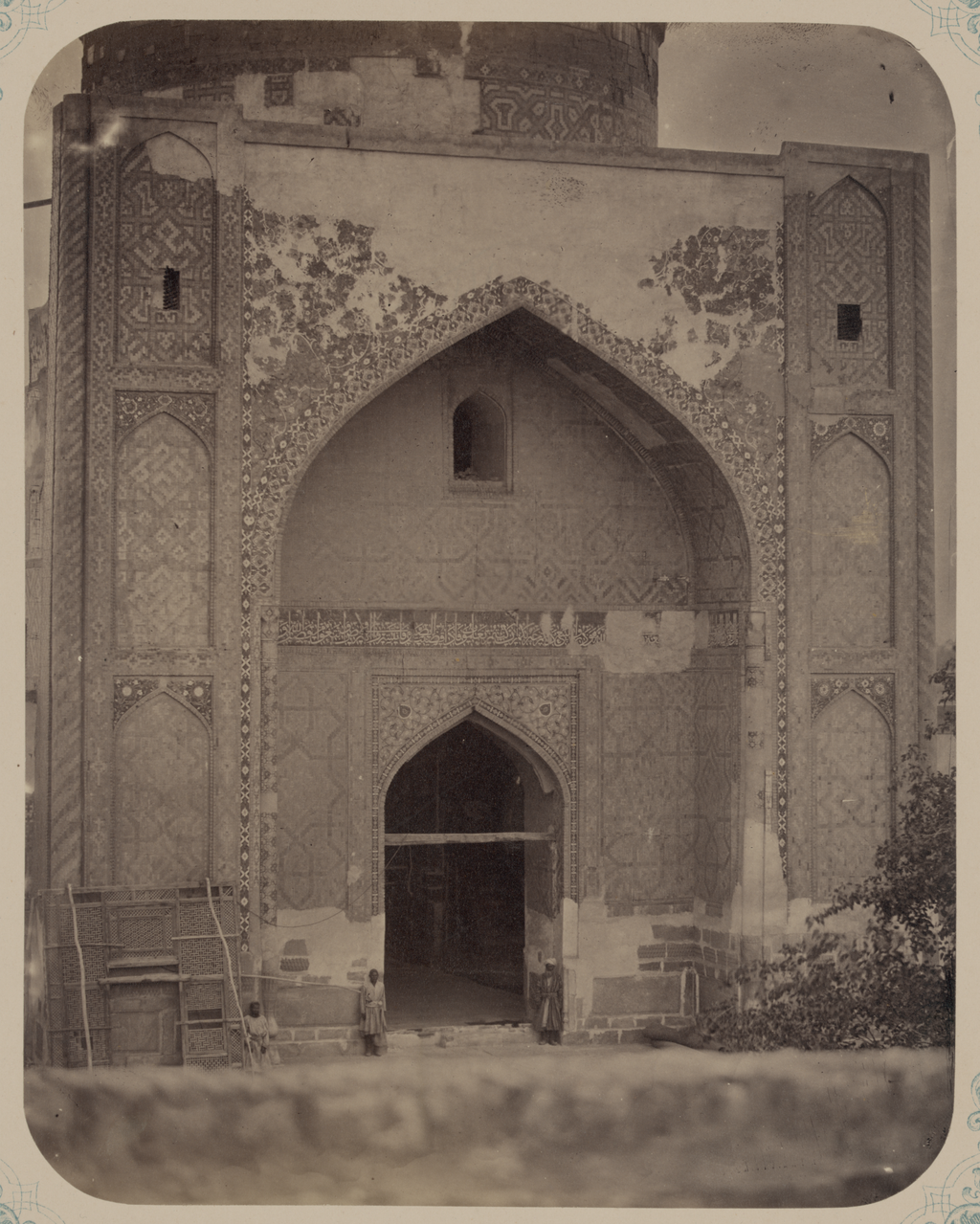
Domed chamber iwan (1868–1872)

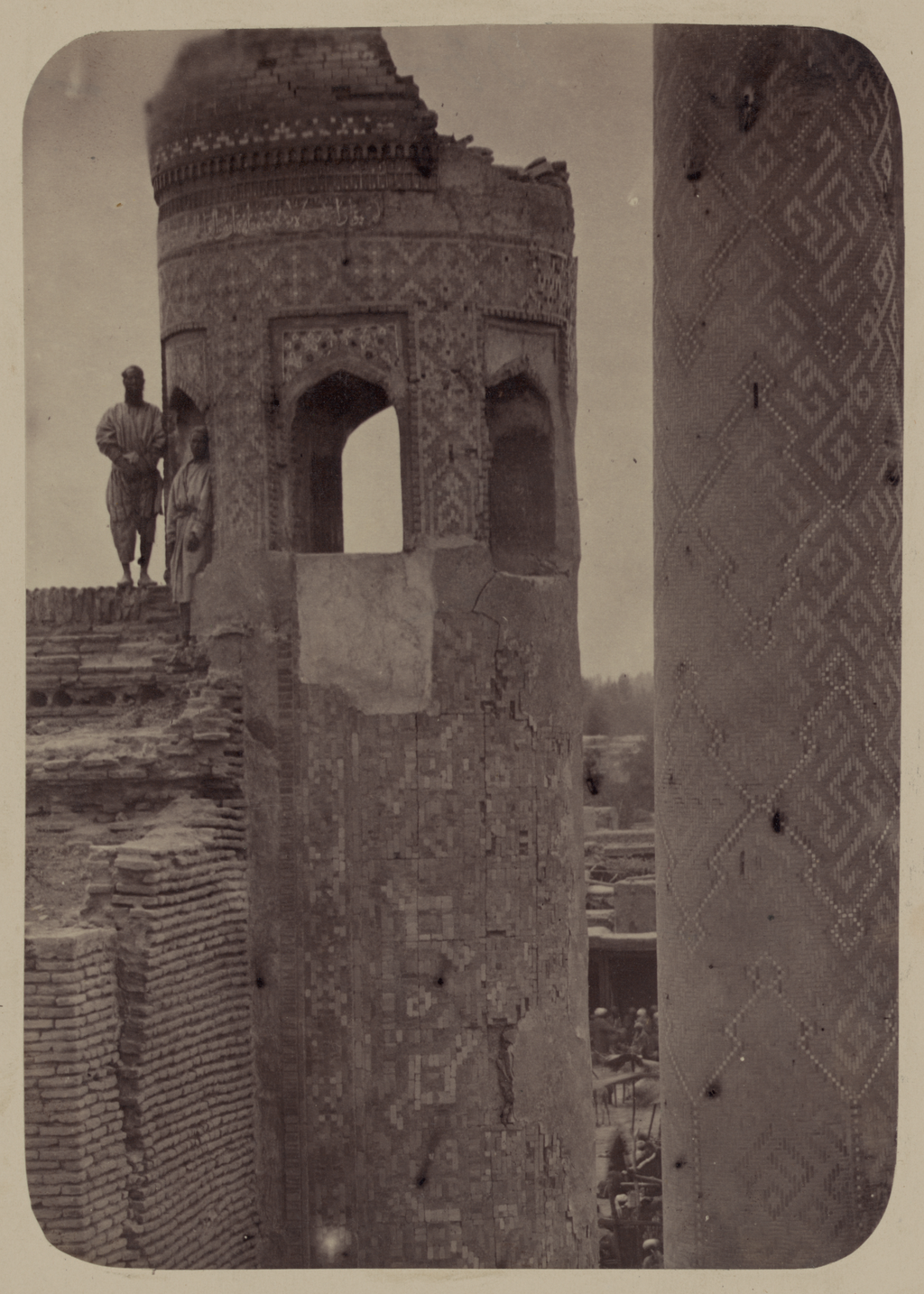
Damaged minaret

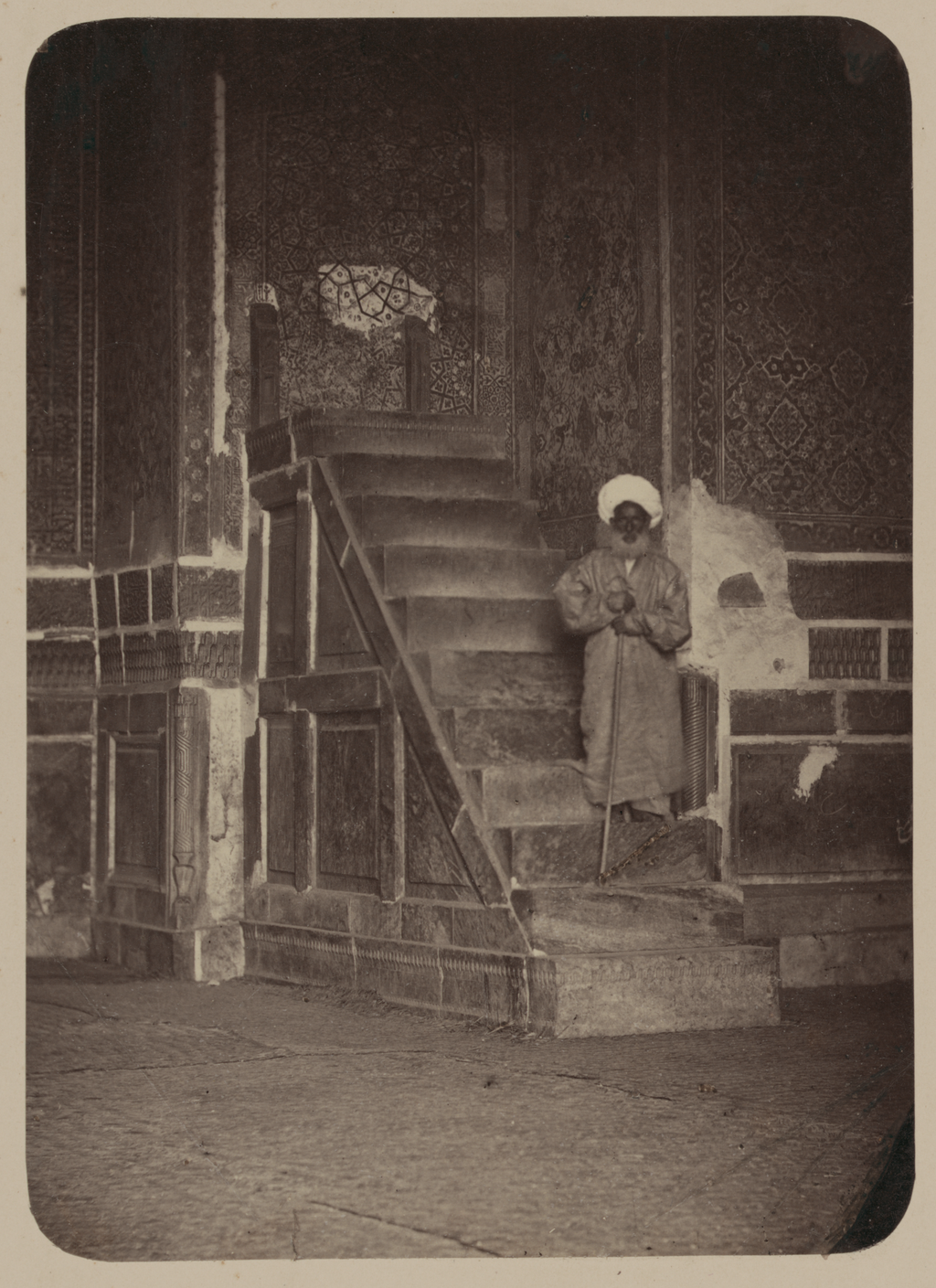
Pulpit (1868–1872)

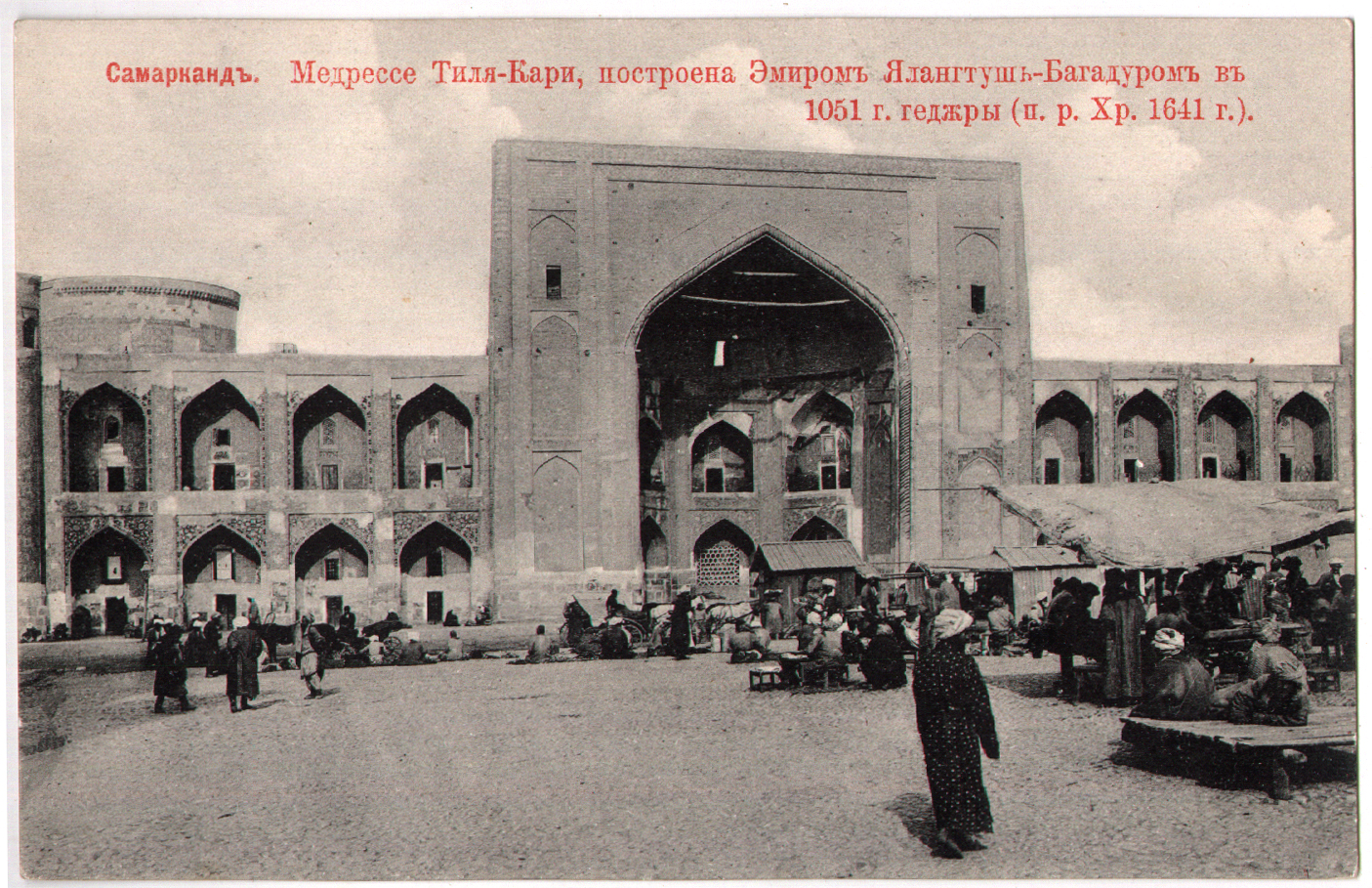
1910

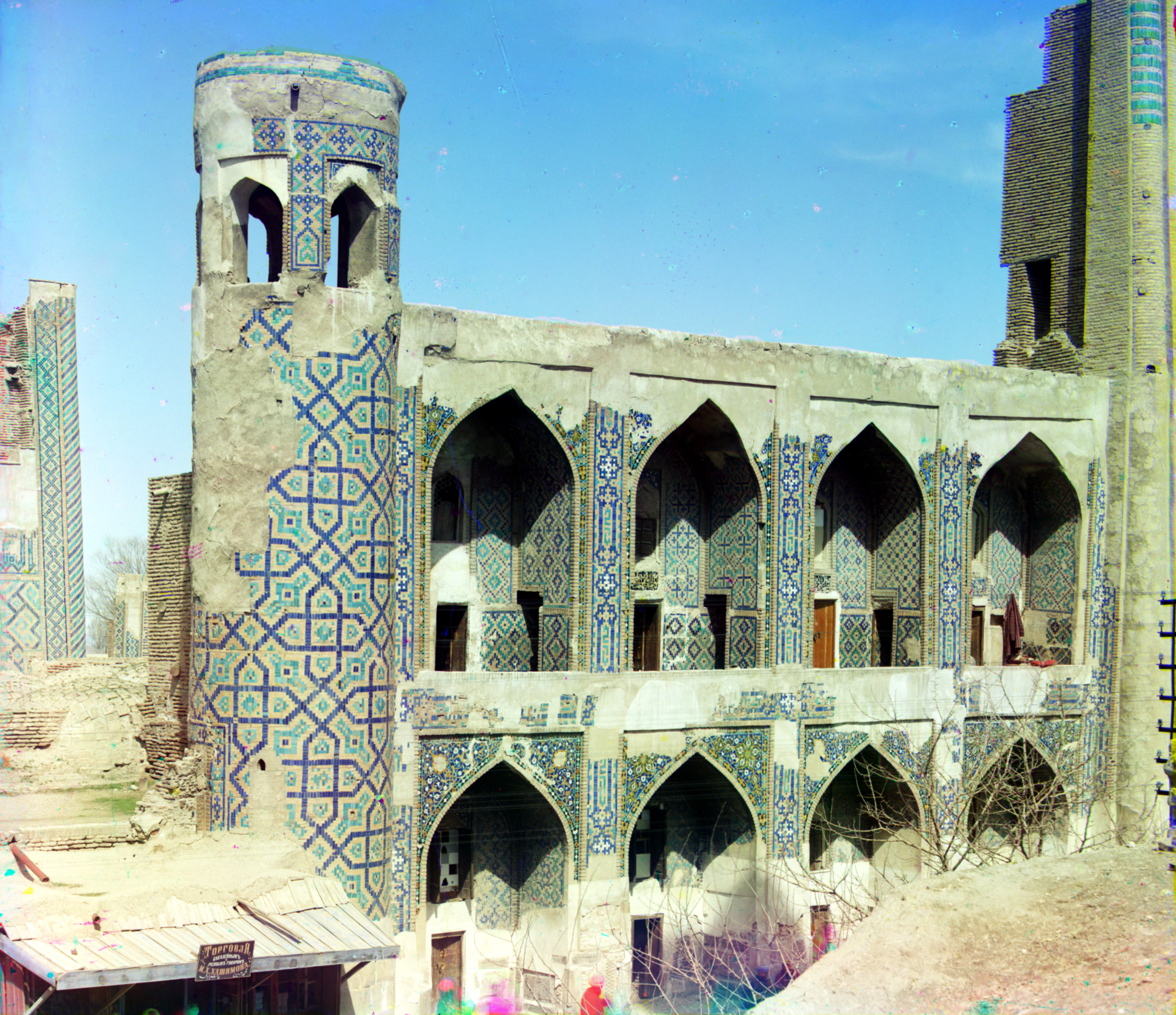
1905–1915

== Sources ==
- Blair, Sheila S.; Bloom, Jonathan M. (1996). The Art and Architecture of Islam 1250–1800. Yale University Press.
- Blunt, Wilfrid (1976). Splendours of Islam.
- Cezar, Mustafs (1983). Typical Commercial Buildings of the Ottoman Classical Period and the Ottoman Construction System.
- Dani, Ahmad Hasan (1993). New Light on Central Asia.
- Hattstein, Markus; Delius, Peter, eds. (2004). Islam: Art and Architecture. Könemann.
- Hillenbrand, Robert (2001). Studies in Medieval Islamic Architecture.
- Lawton, John (1991). Samarkand and Bukhara.
- Mir Izzet Ullah (1825). "Travels beyond the Himalaya". The Quarterly Oriental Magazine.
- O'Kane, Bernard (2021). Studies in Persian Architecture.
