= 819 =

Calendar year

819 in various calendars
- Gregorian calendar: 819; DCCCXIX
- Ab urbe condita: 1572
- Armenian calendar: 268; ԹՎ ՄԿԸ
- Assyrian calendar: 5569
- Balinese saka calendar: 740–741
- Bengali calendar: 225–226
- Berber calendar: 1769
- Buddhist calendar: 1363
- Burmese calendar: 181
- Byzantine calendar: 6327–6328
- Chinese calendar: 戊戌年 (Earth Dog); 3516 or 3309 — to — 己亥年 (Earth Pig); 3517 or 3310
- Coptic calendar: 535–536
- Discordian calendar: 1985
- Ethiopian calendar: 811–812
- Hebrew calendar: 4579–4580
- Hindu calendars
- Vikram Samvat: 875–876
- Shaka Samvat: 740–741
- Kali Yuga: 3919–3920
- Holocene calendar: 10819
- Iranian calendar: 197–198
- Islamic calendar: 203–204
- Japanese calendar: Kōnin 10 (弘仁１０年)
- Javanese calendar: 715–716
- Julian calendar: 819; DCCCXIX
- Korean calendar: 3152
- Minguo calendar: 1093 before ROC 民前1093年
- Nanakshahi calendar: −649
- Seleucid era: 1130/1131 AG
- Thai solar calendar: 1361–1362
- Tibetan calendar: ས་ཕོ་ཁྱི་ལོ་ (male Earth-Dog); 945 or 564 or −208 — to — ས་མོ་ཕག་ལོ་ (female Earth-Boar); 946 or 565 or −207

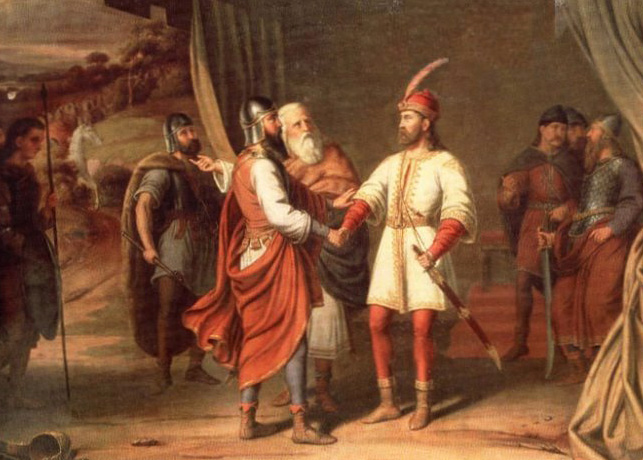
Artist's rendition of Ljudevit Posavski

Year 819 (DCCCXIX) was a common year starting on Saturday of the Julian calendar.

== Events ==
=== By place ===
==== Europe ====
- Spring – Emperor Louis I marries Judith of Bavaria in Aachen. She becomes his second wife and Empress of the Franks. Like many of the royal marriages of the time, Judith is selected through a bridal show.
- Ljudevit, duke of the Slavs in Lower Pannonia, raises a rebellion against the Frankish Empire. Louis I sends an army led by Cadolah of Friuli, but is defeated by the Pannonian Slavs.
- Battle of Kupa: Ljudevit defeats the Frankish forces led by Borna, a vassal of Louis I. He escapes with the help of his elite bodyguard. Ljudevit uses the momentum and invades the Duchy of Croatia.
- Nominoe, a noble Briton, is appointed by Louis I as count of Vannes in Brittany (approximate date).

==== Abbasid Caliphate ====
- August 11 – Caliph Al-Ma'mun returns to Baghdad, securing the city's place as the capital of the Abbasid Caliphate.
- Abbasid caliph Al-Ma'mun dismisses Al-Hasan ibn Sahl as governor of al-Iraq.
- Ghassan ibn Abbad, the Abbasid governor of Khorasan rewards the Samanid brothers, Nuh, Ahmad, Yahya and ilyas for their aid against the rebel Rafi ibn al-Layth, rewarding them each important cities and territories, respectively Samarkand, Farghana, Tashkent and Herat, to govern under Abbasid suzerainty. This becomes the basis for the formation of the Samanid dynasty which will rule Khorasan for a century.

== Births ==
- Martianus Hiberniensis, Irish monk and calligrapher (d. 875)

== Deaths ==
- March 8 – Li Shidao, Chinese warlord
- Áed Oirdnide, king of Ailech (Ireland)
- Cadolah, duke of Friuli (Italy)
- Cairell mac Fiachnai, king of Ulaid (Ireland)
- Cheng Yi, chancellor of the Tang Dynasty
- Hisham ibn al-Kalbi, Arab historian (b. 737)
- Liu Zongyuan, Chinese poet and official (b. 773)
