= Asad ibn Saman =

Samanid prince

Asad ibn Saman (Persian: اسد بن سامان) was an early Samanid. He was the son of Saman Khuda, the founder of the Samanid dynasty.

According to tradition, Asad was named by his father in honor of the Caliphal governor of Khurasan Asad ibn 'Abd Allah al-Qasri (723-727), who had converted Saman to Islam. Asad had four sons: Nuh, Ahmad, Yahya, and Ilyas. Caliph al-Mamun appointed Asad's sons to be rulers of Samarqand, Ferghana, Shash and Ustrushana, and Hirat, and thus the dynasty of rulers was started. The famous Samanid ruler Ismail I (Ismail Samani) (892-907) was Asad's grandson and the son of Ahmad.

== Sources ==
- Frye, R.N. (1975). "The Sāmānids". In Frye, R.N. (ed.). The Cambridge History of Iran, Volume 4: From the Arab Invasion to the Saljuqs. Cambridge: Cambridge University Press. pp. 136–161. ISBN 0-521-20093-8.
