= Timeline of Tashkent =

Timeline of the Uzbek capital

Coordinates: 41°16′N 69°13′E

The following is a timeline of the history of the city of Tashkent, Uzbekistan.

== Before 20th century ==
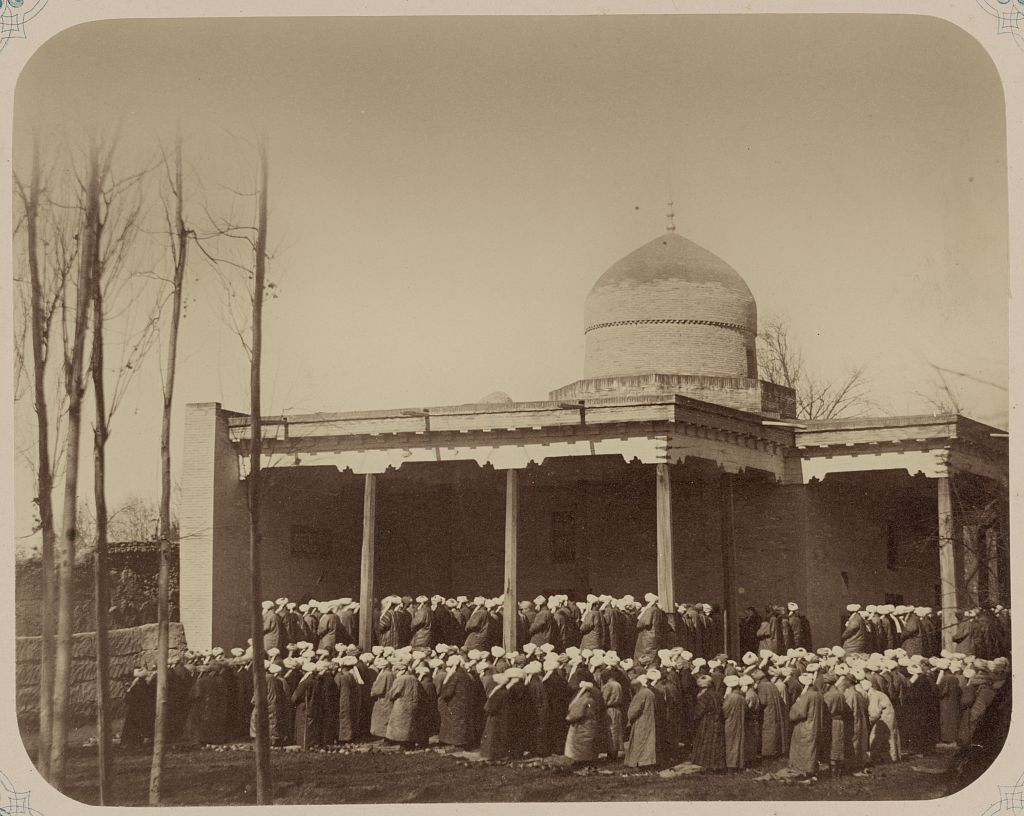
Sheikhantaur Mosque, ca.1870s

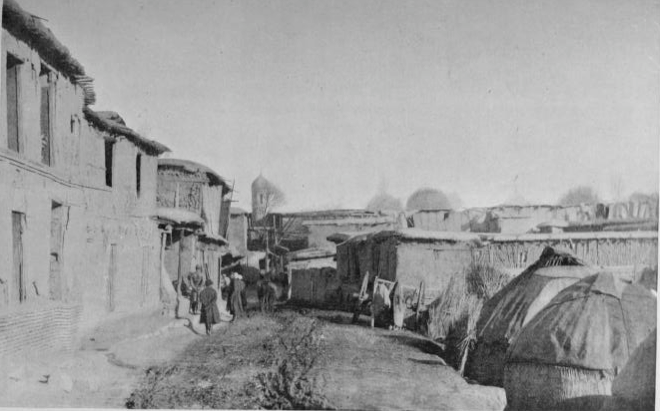
Street in Tashkent, 1890s

- 500 BC – till 5th part of the Kushan Empire
- 1210 AD – City sacked by forces of Muhammad II of Khwarezm (approximate date).
- 1220 – City sacked by forces of Genghis Khan.
- 1451 – Dzhuma Mosque built.
- 1485 – Yunus Khan in power.
- 1569 – Kukeltash Madrasa built.
- 1611 – Uprising; crackdown by forces of Imam Quli Khan of Bukhara.
- 1809 – City becomes part of the Khanate of Kokand.
- 1840 – Cholera outbreak.
- 1865
  - 15 June: City captured by Russian forces led by Mikhail Chernyayev.
  - Population: 76,000.
- 1867 – City becomes capital of Russian Turkestan, and center of the Syr-Darya Oblast.
- 1870
  - Turkistan Gaziti newspaper begins publication.
  - Trade fair held.
  - Kaufmann Library founded.
- 1871 – Population: 120,000 (estimate).
- 1872 – Cholera outbreak.
- 1874 – Turkestan Military District headquartered in Tashkent.
- 1876 – National Museum of Turkestan founded.
- 1877 – City government reorganized.
- 1889 – Trans-Caspian Railway begins operating.
- 1892 – 24 June: Demonstration related to public health.
- 1895 – Samarkand-Tashkent railway begins operating.
- 1896 – Lutheran Church built.
- 1897 – Population: 156,506.
- 1898 – Russian Orthodox church built in Amir Temur Square.

== 20th century ==
- 1901 – Horsecar trams begin operating.
- 1904 – Orenburg-Tashkent Railway begins operating.
- 1905 – "Mutiny of Tsarist officers."
- 1910 – Monument to Konstantin von Kaufman dedicated.
- 1912 – Polish Church, the present Sacred Heart Cathedral, built.
- 1913 – Population: 172,300.
- 1914
  - 28 October – A group of Polish civilians from Warsaw imprisoned by the Russians in Tashkent.
  - Military college established.
- 1915 – 3 March: Polish civilians from Warsaw released from prison; however, they were still required to remain in the city.
- 1916 – "Anti-labour conscription revolt."
- 1917
  - February Revolution.
  - 2 March: Tashkent Soviet established.
  - April: Turkestan Muslim Congress held.
  - Pravda Vostoka newspaper begins publication.
- 1918
  - April: City becomes capital of the Turkestan Autonomous Soviet Socialist Republic.
  - Turkestan People's University and Turkestan People's Conservatory founded.
- 1920 – National Public Library of Uzbekistan established (approximate date).
- 1924
  - City becomes part of the Uzbek Soviet Socialist Republic.
  - Uthman Quran relocated to Tashkent from Ufa.
  - Tashkent Zoo founded.
- 1925 – Sharq Yulduzi film studio established.
- 1926 – Population: 323,000.
- 1930
  - Capital of Uzbek Soviet Socialist Republic relocated to Tashkent from Samarkand.
  - Central Asian Construction Institute and Tashkent Communication Polytechnic founded.
- 1931 – Central Asian Institute of Railway Engineers and Central Asian Institute of Economics founded.
- 1932 – Arts Study Institute founded.
- 1938 – City becomes capital of Tashkent Province.
- 1939 – Komsomol Lake in Stalin Park.
- 1943 – Academy of Sciences of the Uzbek SSR established.
- 1947 – Navoi Theatre built.
- 1955 – Tashkent Electro Technical Institute of Communication founded.
- 1956
  - Pakhtakor football club formed.
  - Pakhtakor Markaziy Stadium opens.
- 1962 – Haskovo (Bulgaria)-Tashkent brother-city program established.
- 1964 – Tashkent Palace of Arts built.
- 1965 – Population: 1,092,000.
- 1966
  - January: City hosts signing of India-Pakistan peace agreement.
  - 26 April: The M5.1 Tashkent earthquake destroys much of the city, leaving between 15 and 200 people dead, and around 300,000 homeless.
- 1971 – Spartak Tashkent ice hockey team formed.
- 1973 – Sister city relationship established with Seattle, USA.
- 1977 – Tashkent Metro begins operating.
- 1979 – Population: 1,858,000.
- 1984 – Tashkent Tower built.
- 1985 – Population: 2,030,000 (estimate).
- 1988 – Seattle-Tashkent Peace Park dedicated.

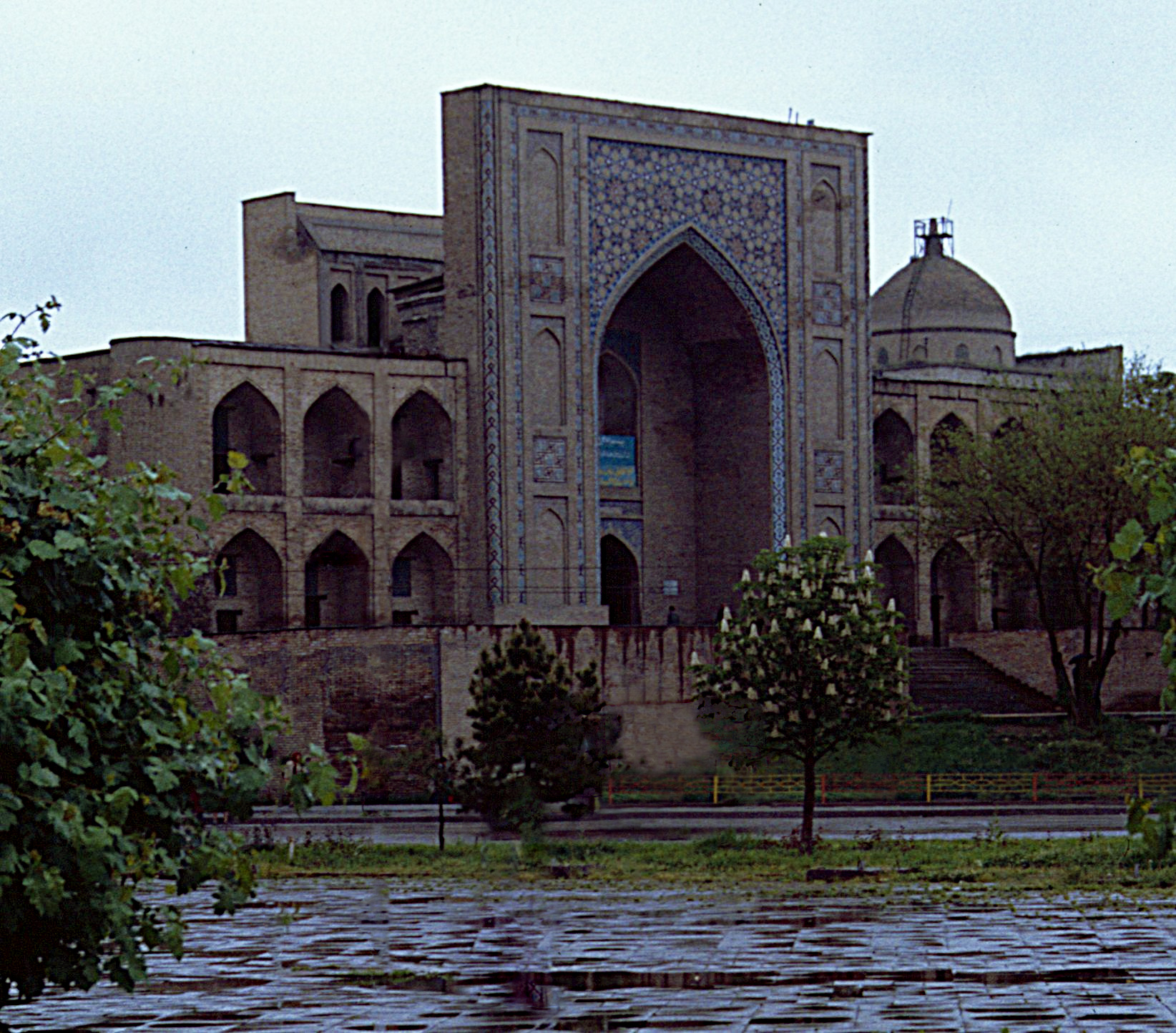
Kukeldash Madrasah in the 1990s

- 1991
  - City becomes capital of the Republic of Uzbekistan.
  - Tashkent State Institute of Law and Tashkent Architectural Building Institute established.
- 1992 – Statue of Vladimir Lenin in Independence Square removed.
- 1994 – Tashkent Stock Exchange and Tashkent International School established.
- 1996
  - Amir Timur Museum established.
  - Kuyluk Market built.
- 1998 – JAR Stadium opens.
- 1999
  - 16 February: Bombings.
  - Tashkent Open tennis tournament begins.
  - Crying Mother Monument erected.

== 21st century ==
- 2001
  - Tashkent International Airport terminal rebuilt.
  - Population: 2,137,218.
- 2003 – May: City hosts meeting of European Bank for Reconstruction and Development.
- 2004 – July: Bombings.
- 2005 – Bunyodkor PFK football club formed.
- 2008 – Tashkent Challenger tennis tournament begins.
- 2010 – City hosts the 2010 World Sambo Championships.
- 2011 – Tashkent–Samarkand high-speed rail line begins operating.

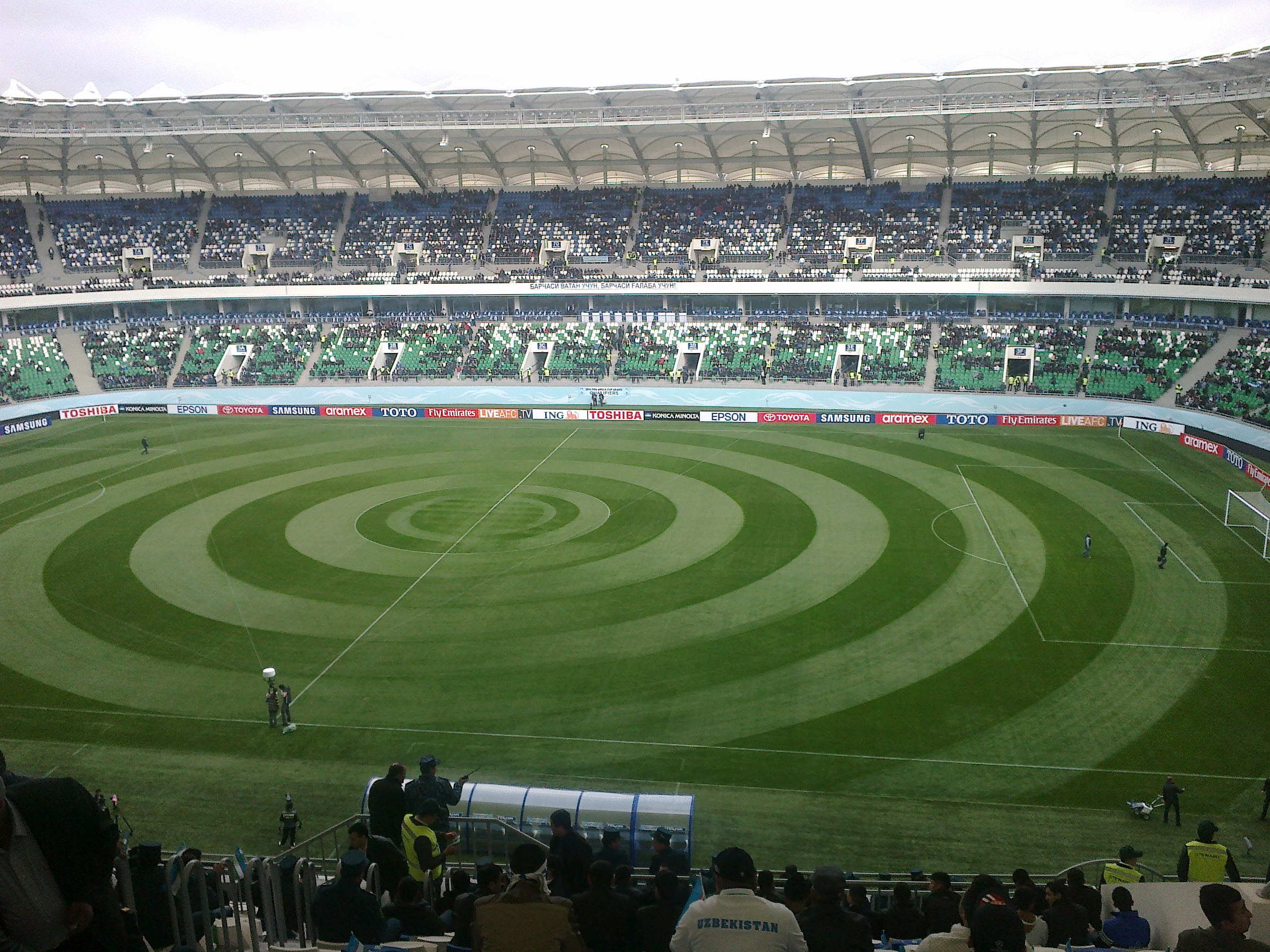
Milliy Stadium in 2013

- 2012
  - July: City hosts the 2012 Asian Karate Championships.
  - September: Milliy Stadium opened.
- 2014 – City hosts the 2014 World Wrestling Championships.
- 2016 – City hosts the 2016 Asian Weightlifting Championships.
- 2018 - Population: 2,464,933 (estimate).
- 2021
  - November: City hosts the 2021 World Sambo Championships.
  - December: City hosts the 2021 World Weightlifting Championships.
- 2022
  - October: City hosts the 2022 World Judo Championships.
  - December: City hosts the 2022 Asian Karate Championships.
- 2023 – City hosts the 2023 IBA Men's World Boxing Championships.

== See also ==
- Tashkent history
- History of Tashkent
- Districts of Tashkent
- Other names of Tashkent
- Timeline of Samarkand

== Bibliography ==
=== Published in 19th century ===
- "Tashkund". Edinburgh Gazetteer. Edinburgh: Longman, Rees, Orme, Brown, and Green. 1822.
- Edward Balfour, ed. (1871). "Tashkend". Cyclopaedia of India and of Eastern and Southern Asia (2nd ed.). Madras.
- Eugene Schuyler (1877), "Tashkent", Turkistan, New York: Scribner, Armstrong & Co.
- L.F. Kostenko (1880). "(Ташкент)". Turkestanskij (in Russian).
- John Mowbray Trotter (1882). "Tashkand". Western Turkestan. Calcutta: Superintendent of Government Printing.
- Henry Lansdell (1885). "Tashkend". Russian Central Asia, including Kuldja, Bokhara, Khiva and Merv. London: Sampson Low, Marston, Searle, & Rivington.

=== Published in 20th century ===
- Michael Myers Shoemaker (1904), "By Tarantass to Tashkendt", Heart of the Orient: Saunterings through Georgia, Armenia, Persia, Turkomania, and Turkestan, to the Vale of Paradise, New York: G.P. Putnam's Sons
- Chisholm, Hugh, ed. (1911). "Tashkent" . Encyclopædia Britannica. Vol. 26 (11th ed.). Cambridge University Press. p. 437.
- William Eleroy Curtis (1911), "Tashkend", Turkestan, New York: Hodder & Stoughton
- E.G. Kemp (1911), "Tashkent", The Face of Manchuria, Korea, Russian Turkestan, New York: Duffield
- "Tashkent". Russia. Leipzig: Karl Baedeker. 1914. OCLC 1328163.
- "Islam Is Neglected in Tashkent, Visitor to Soviet Asian City Finds; One Mosque Padlocked and in Disrepair, Another Converted Into Warehouse". New York Times. 15 August 1955.
- "Tashkent Is Called a Showplace of Soviet Industrial Rise in Asia". New York Times. 27 November 1961.
- David MacKenzie (1969). "Tashkent—Past and Present". Russian Review. 28.
- Richard A. Pierce (1975). "Toward Soviet Power in Tashkent, February–October 1917". Canadian Slavonic Papers. 17.
- Tashkent Entsiklopediya (in Russian). 1984.
- Toşkent: entsiklopediya (in Uzbek). Toşkent: Ḳomuslar Boş Tahririyati. 1992.
- Adeeb Khalid (1996). "Tashkent 1917: Muslim Politics in Revolutionary Turkestan". Slavic Review. 55.
- Daniel Balland (1997). "Tachkent, metropole de l'Asie centrale?". Cahiers d'études sur la Méditerranée orientale et le monde Turco-Iranien (in French). 24.

=== Published in 21st century ===
- Jeff Sahadeo (2004). "Empire of Memories: Conquest and Civilization in Imperial Russian Tashkent". Canadian Slavonic Papers. 46.
- C. Edmund Bosworth, ed. (2007). "Tashkent". Historic Cities of the Islamic World. Leiden: Koninklijke Brill. ISBN 978-9004153882.
- Jeff Sahadeo, Russian Colonial Society in Tashkent, 1865–1923 (Bloomington, IN, Indiana University Press, 2010).
- Paul Stronski (2010). Tashkent: Forging a Soviet City, 1930–1966. Pittsburgh: University of Pittsburgh Press. ISBN 978-0822973898.
- Artyom Kosmarski (2011), "Grandeur and Decay of the Soviet Byzantium: Spaces, Peoples, and Memories of Tashkent, Uzbekistan", in Tsypylma Darieva; et al. (eds.), Urban Spaces after Socialism, Frankfurt am Main: Campus, ISBN 9783593393841
