= Nasr I =

Nasr I نصر یکم

Amir of the Samanids
- Reign: 864/5–892
- Predecessor: Ahmad ibn Asad
- Successor: Ismail Samani
- Died: 892
- Father: Ahmad ibn Asad
- Religion: Sunni Islam (Hanafi)

Nasr I (Persian: نصر یکم; died August 892) was amir of the Samanids from 865 to 892. He was the son and successor of Ahmad ibn Asad.

With the weakening of the Tahirid governors of Khurasan at the hand of the Saffarid ruler Ya'qub ibn Layth (r. 861–879), Nasr was able to virtually rule as an independent monarch. In 874, Nasr sent his brother Ismail Samani to capture the city of Bukhara, which had recently been ravaged by troops of Khwarazm. The city opened its gates to him, and Ismail was appointed governor by Nasr. Disagreement over where tax money should be distributed, however, caused a conflict to erupt between the brothers in 885. Ismail eventually proved victorious, and took control of the Samanid state. However, Nasr had been the one who had been invested with Transoxiana, and the Abbasid caliph continued to recognize him as the rightful ruler. Because of this, Ismail continued to recognize his brother as well, but Nasr was completely powerless, a situation that persisted until his death in 892.

== Biography ==
Map of Khurasan and Transoxiana

Nasr was the son of Ahmad ibn Asad, who ruled a significant part of Transoxiana under the suzerainty of the Abbasid Caliphate. Upon his father's death, Nasr received most of Transoxiana, including Samarqand, while his brother Ya'qub received Shash. The weakening of the Tahirid governors of Khurasan at the hand of the Saffarid ruler Ya'qub ibn Layth (r. 861–879) enabled Nasr to virtually rule as an independent monarch. The distance of Nasr's realm in Transoxiana benefited him to not get caught in the abrupt power struggles that were occurring in Iran. The Samanid branch in the Khurasanian city of Herat, however, ended when Ya'qub defeated and captured Ibrahim ibn Ilyas in 867. In 870/1, Nasr gave shelter to the Banijurid ruler Da'ud ibn Abbas, who had fled from his domain after Ya'qub briefly occupied the city of Balkh. In 874, the Abbasid caliph al-Mu'tamid (r. 870–892) sent Nasr an investiture for the governorships of Transoxania and Balkh, in an effort to counter the claims of Ya'qub. Da'ud ibn Abbas' successor Abu Da'ud Muhammad ibn Ahmad (r. 873–898/899), who ruled Balkh, presumably became a vassal of Nasr.

In the same year, Hanafi clerics from the neighbouring city of Bukhara requested the help of Nasr. With the collapse of the Tahirids, the city had fallen into a turbulent power vacuum, and was subject to repeated incursions by the Afrighid shahs of Khwarazm. Nasr sent a force under his younger brother Ismail Samani to capture Bukhara, which welcomed him. Nevertheless, the Bukhar-Khudah continued to officially remain in control of the city. In 885, a disagreement over where tax money should be distributed caused a falling out between Nasr and Isma'il. A three year struggle ensued, in which Isma'il proved victorious. Although he took effective control of the state, he did not formally overthrow his brother, instead remaining in Bukhara. He did so because Nasr had been the one whom the Caliph had given the formal investiture of Transoxiana to; in the caliph's eyes, Nasr was the only legitimimate ruler of the region. Isma'il therefore continued to formally recognize Nasr as ruler until the latter's death in August of 892, at which point he officially took power.

== Sources ==
- Bosworth, C.E. (1965). "G̲h̲ulām". In Lewis, B.; Pellat, Ch. & Schacht, J. (eds.). The Encyclopaedia of Islam, Second Edition. Volume II: C–G. Leiden: E. J. Brill. OCLC 495469475.
- Bosworth, C.E. & Crowe, Yolande (1965). "Sāmānids". In Lewis, B.; Pellat, Ch. & Schacht, J. (eds.). The Encyclopaedia of Islam, Second Edition. Volume II: C–G. Leiden: E. J. Brill. OCLC 495469475.
- Bosworth, C. E. (1982a). "Abbasid Caliphate". Encyclopaedia Iranica, Vol. I, Fasc. 1. pp. 89–95.
- Bosworth, C. E. (1998). "Esmāʿīl, b. Aḥmad b. Asad Sāmānī, Abū Ebrāhīm". Encyclopaedia Iranica, Vol. VIII, Fasc. 6. pp. 636–637.
- Foltz, Richard (2019). A History of the Tajiks: Iranians of the East. New York: Bloomsbury Publishing. pp. 1–256. ISBN 978-1-78831-652-1.
- Frye, R. N. (1975). "The Sāmānids". In Frye, Richard N. (ed.). The Cambridge History of Iran. Vol. 4: From the Arab Invasion to the Saljuqs. Cambridge: Cambridge University Press. ISBN 0-521-20093-8.
- Kennedy, Hugh (2004). The Prophet and the Age of the Caliphates: The Islamic Near East from the 6th to the 11th Century (Second ed.). Harlow: Longman. ISBN 978-0-582-40525-7.
- Marlow, Louise (2016). "Abū Zayd al-Balkhī and the Naṣīḥat al-mulūk of Pseudo-Māwardī". Der Islam. 93. De Gruyter: 35–64. doi:10.1515/islam-2016-0002.
- Spuler, Bertold (2014). Iran in the Early Islamic Period: Politics, Culture, Administration and Public Life between the Arab and the Seljuk Conquests, 633–1055. Brill. ISBN 978-90-04-28209-4.

Preceded by Ahmad ibn Asad	Amir of the Samanids; 864/5–892	Succeeded by Ismail Samani
