= Ismail Samani =

Amir of the Samanid Empire from 892 to 907

Ismail Samani اسماعیل سامانی
- Amir
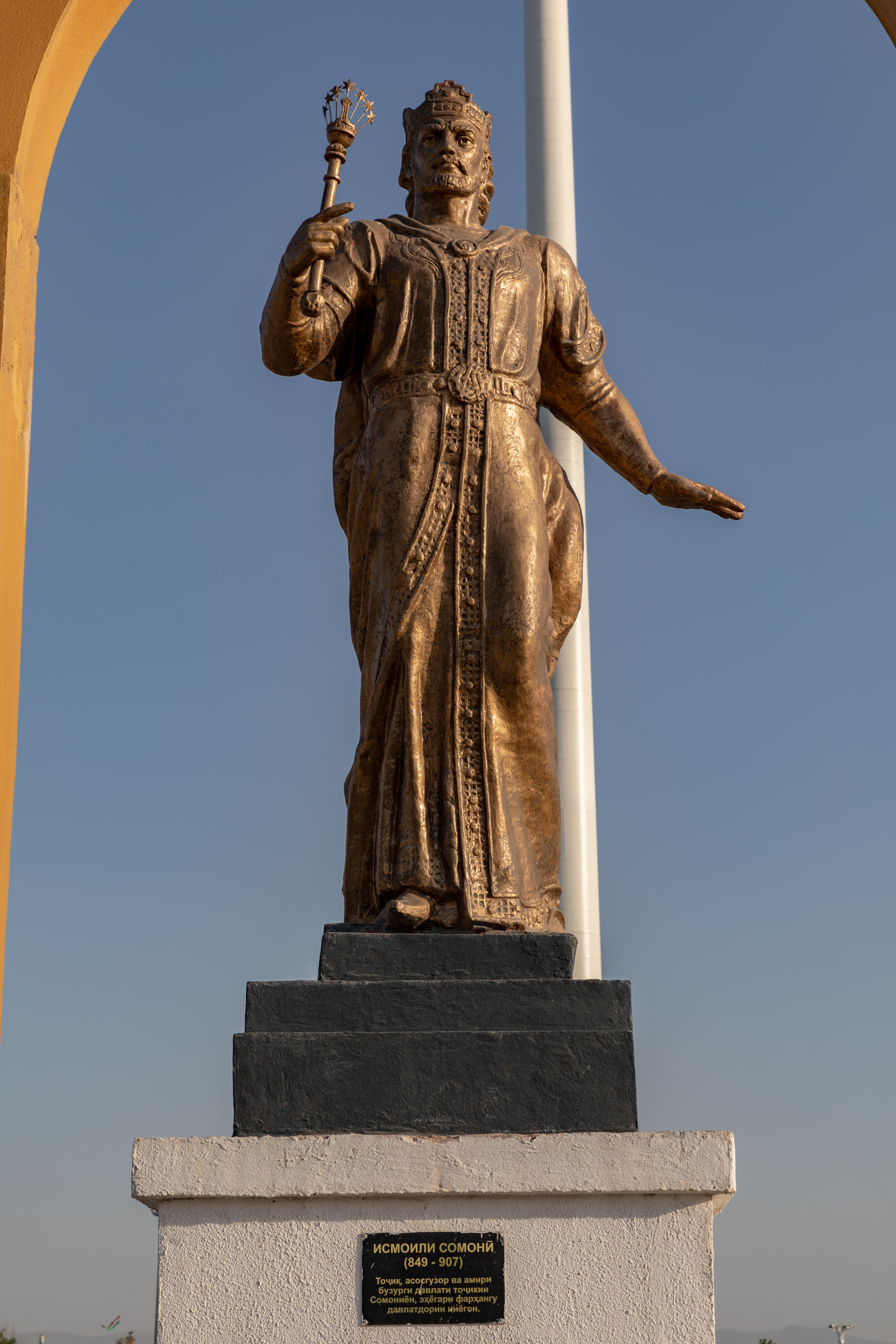
- The statue of Ismail Samani in the city of Dushanbe

Amir of the Samanid Empire
- Reign: August 892 – 24 November 907
- Predecessor: Nasr I
- Successor: Ahmad Samani
- Born: May 849; Farghana
- Died: 24 November 907 (aged 58); Bukhara
- Burial: Samanid Mausoleum, Bukhara
- Issue: Ahmad Samani
- Dynasty: Samanids
- Father: Ahmad ibn Asad
- Religion: Sunni Islam (Hanafi)

Abū Ibrāhīm Ismā'īl ibn-i Aḥmad-i Sāmāni (Persian: ابو ابراهیم اسماعیل بن احمد سامانی; May 849 – 24 November 907), better known simply as Amir Ismail-i Samani (اسماعیل سامانی), and also known as Isma'il ibn-i Ahmad (اسماعیل بن احمد), was the Samanid amir of Transoxiana (892–907) and Khorasan (900–907). His reign saw the emergence of the Samanids as a powerful force. He was the son of Ahmad ibn-i Asad and a descendant of Saman Khuda, the eponymous ancestor of the Samanid dynasty who renounced Zoroastrianism and embraced Islam.

== Background ==
The Samanids were native to Balkh, which suggests that they came from a Bactrian background. The family itself claimed to be the descendants of the Parthian Mihran family, one of the Seven Great Houses of Iran during the pre-Islamic Sasanian era. However, this was possibly a mere attempt to enhance their lineage. They may originally have been of Hephthalite descent, (Note: The Hephthalites were a tribal group that was most prominent of the "Iranian Huns". In the second half of the 5th-century, they controlled Tukharistan/Bactria and also seemingly chunks of southern Transoxiana.) as suggested by the fact that one of the coins issued by them is executed in the same style as those of the Hephthalites, rather than that of the Sasanians. Regardless, the Samanid royal family both spoke and advocated Persian, and also used many pre-Islamic bureaucratic titles, probably part of their aim to spread the belief that their rule was a continuation of the Sasanian Empire.

== Early life ==
Ismail was born in Farghana in 849—he was the son of Ahmad ibn Asad, and had a brother named Nasr I, who ascended the Samanid throne in 864/5. During Nasr's reign, Ismail was sent to take control of Bukhara, which had been devastated by looting on the part of forces from Khwarezm. The citizens of the city welcomed Ismail, seeing him as someone who could bring stability.

Soon afterwards, a disagreement over where tax money should be distributed caused a falling out between Nasr and Ismail. A struggle ensued, in which Ismail proved victorious. Although he took effective control of the state, he did not formally overthrow his brother, instead remaining in Bukhara. He did so because Nasr had been the one to whom the Caliph had given the formal investiture of Transoxiana; in the caliph's eyes, Nasr was the only legitimate ruler of the region. Furthermore, the Saffarids of Sistan had claims on Transoxiana; the overthrow of Nasr would have given the Saffarids a pretext for invading. Ismail therefore continued to formally recognize Nasr as ruler until the latter's death in August 892, at which point he officially took power.

== Reign ==
=== Consolidation of power in Transoxiana and Khorasan ===
Map of Khorasan and its surrounding regions

Ismail was active to the north and east, steadily spreading Samanid influence as well as solidifying his control over other areas including Kirman, Sistan and Kabul. Ismail was successful in establishing economic and commercial development and organized a powerful army. It was said that he made his capital Bukhara into one of Islam's most glorious cities, as Ismail attracted scholars, artists, and doctors of law into the region. The first translation of the Qur'an into Persian was completed during Samanid rule. Sunni theology greatly cultivated during Ismail's reign, as numerous mosques and madrassas were built.

In 893, Ismail took the city of Taraz, the capital of the Karluk Turks, taking large numbers of slaves and livestock. In addition, a Nestorian church was converted into a mosque. He also brought an end to the Principality of Ushrusana, extending Samanid control over the Syr Darya river. Ismail and other Samanid rulers propagated Islam amongst the inhabitants and as many as 30,000 tents of Turks came to profess Islam. During his reign he subjugated numerous regional states to the east, directly incorporating some within his boundaries and retaining the local rulers of others as vassals. Khwarezm to the north was partitioned; the southern part remained autonomous under its Afrighid rulers, while the northern part was governed by a Samanid official. Another campaign in 903 further secured the Samanid boundaries. These campaigns kept the heart of his state safe from Turkish raids, and allowed Muslim missionaries to expand their activities in the region.

Even after his brother Nasr's death, Ismail's rule in Bukhara was not formally recognized by the caliph at that point. As a result, the Saffarid ruler 'Amr-i Laith himself asked the caliph for the investiture of Transoxiana. The caliph, Al-Mu'tadid, however, sent Ismail a letter urging him to fight Amr-i Laith and the Saffarids whom the caliph considered usurpers. According to the letter, the caliph stated that he prayed for Ismail, who the caliph considered the rightful ruler of Khorasan. The letter had a profound effect on Ismail, as he was determined to oppose the Saffarids.

The two sides fought in Balkh, northern Afghanistan during the spring of 900. During battle, Ismail was significantly outnumbered as he came out with 20,000 horsemen against Amr's 70,000-strong cavalry. Ismail's horsemen were ill-equipped with most having wooden stirrups while some had no shields or lances. Amr-i Laith's cavalry on the other hand, were fully equipped with weapons and armor. Despite fierce fighting, Amr was captured as some of his troops switched sides and joined Ismail. Ismail wished to ransom him to the Saffarids, but they refused, so he sent 'Amr to the caliph, who blamed 'Amr's conduct in the matter and then invested Ismail with Khorasan, Tabaristan, Ray, and Isfahan.

=== Samanid conquest of northern Iran ===
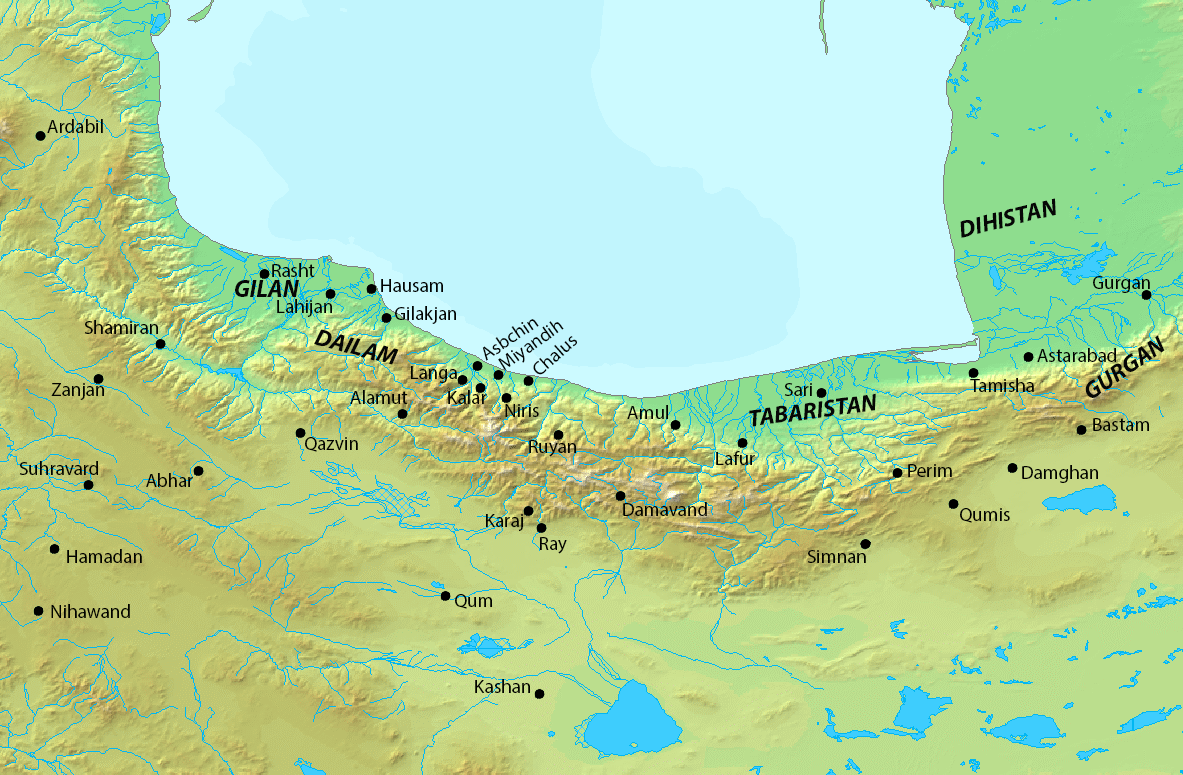
Map of northern Iran

Ismail decided to take advantage of the caliph's grant by sending an army to Tabaristan, which was then controlled by the Zaydids under Muhammad ibn Zayd. Muhammad and his army met the Samanid army under Muhammad ibn Harun al-Sarakhsi at Gurgan, and in the ensuing battle, the Samanids prevailed, and the severely wounded Muhammad was captured. He died on the next day, 3 October 900 (or in August, according to Abu'l-Faraj). His corpse was decapitated, and his head was sent to Ismail at the Samanid court at Bukhara.

As Muhammad's son and designated heir Zayd was also captured and sent to Bukhara, the Zaydid leaders agreed to name Zayd's infant son al-Mahdi as their ruler, but dissension broke out among their ranks: one of them proclaimed himself for the Abbasids instead, and his troops attacked and massacred the Zaydid supporters. Instead, the Samanids took over the province. The Samanid conquest brought along a restoration of Sunni Islam in the province.

However, Ismail's general Muhammad ibn Harun shortly revolted, forcing Ismail to send an army under his son Ahmad Samani and cousin Abu'l-Abbas Abdullah into northern Persia in 901, including Tabaristan, forcing Muhammad to flee to Daylam. The Samanid army also managed to conquer several other cities including Ray and Qazvin, though subsequent rulers lost the territory to the Daylamites and Kurds. Ismail then appointed his cousin Abu'l-Abbas Abdullah as the governor of Tabaristan.

Although Ismail continued to send gifts to the caliph, as was customary, he neither paid tribute or taxes. For all intents and purposes he was an independent ruler, although he never took any title higher than that of amir.

=== Death ===
After a long sickness Ismail died on 24 November 907 and was succeeded by his son Ahmad Samani. Ismail gave enormous amounts of booty and riches to others, and kept nothing.

== Legacy ==
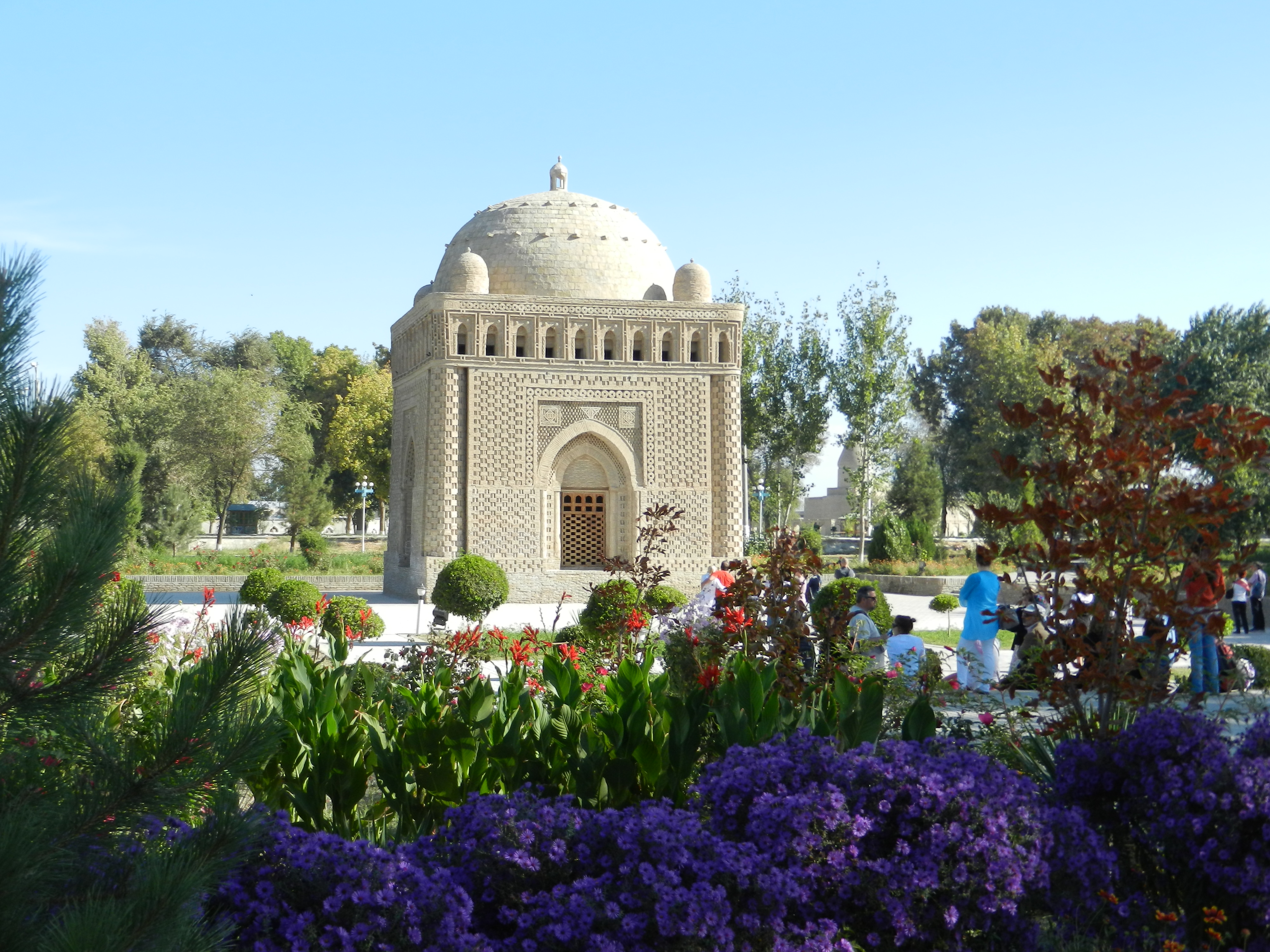
Picture of the Samanid Mausoleum, the burial site of Ismail.

Ismail is known in history as a competent general and a strong ruler; many stories about him are written in Arabic and Persian sources. Furthermore, because of his campaigns in the north, his empire was so safe from enemy incursions that the defences of Bukhara and Samarkand went unused. However, this later had consequences; at the end of the dynasty, the earlier strong, but now crumbling walls, were greatly missed by the Samanids, who were constantly under attack by the Karakhanids and other enemies.

According to a Bukharian historian writing in 943, Ismail:

Was indeed worthy and right for padishahship. He was an intelligent, just, compassionate person, one possessing reason and prescience...he conducted affairs with justice and good ethics. Whoever tyrannized people he would punish...In affairs of state he was always impartial.

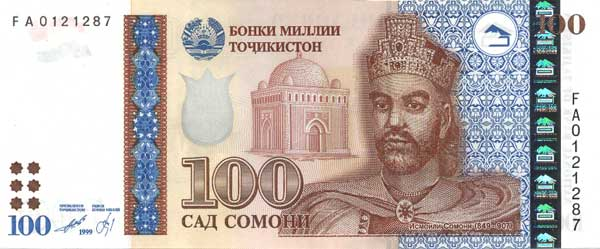
100 somoni bill, from Tajikistan

The celebrated scholar Nizam al-Mulk, in his famous work, Siyasatnama, stated that Ismail:

Was extremely just, and his good qualities were many. He had pure faith in God (to Him be power and glory) and he was generous to the poor – to name only one of his notable virtues.

With the end of Soviet rule in Tajikistan, Ismail's legacy was resurrected and rehabilitated by a new Tajik state. The currency of Tajikistan is named after him (the somoni), and he is depicted on the SM 100 banknote. Also, the highest mountain in Tajikistan (and in the former Soviet Union) was renamed after Ismail. The mountain, formerly known as "Stalin Peak" and "Communism Peak", was subsequently renamed as the Ismoil Somoni Peak.

== See also ==
- Al-Sawad al-A'zam
- Ismoil Somoni Peak
- Somoni

== Sources ==
- Bosworth, C.E. (1975). "The Ṭāhirids and Ṣaffārids". In Frye, R.N. (ed.). The Cambridge History of Iran, Volume 4: From the Arab Invasion to the Saljuqs. Cambridge: Cambridge University Press. pp. 90–135. ISBN 9780521200936.
- Daryaee, Touraj; Rezakhani, Khodadad (2017). "The Sasanian Empire". In Daryaee, Touraj (ed.). King of the Seven Climes: A History of the Ancient Iranian World (3000 BCE - 651 CE). UCI Jordan Center for Persian Studies. pp. 1–236. ISBN 9780692864401.
- Foltz, Richard (2019). A History of the Tajiks: Iranians of the East. New York: Bloomsbury Publishing. ISBN 978-1784539559.
- Frye, R.N. (1975). "The Sāmānids". In Frye, R.N. (ed.). The Cambridge History of Iran, Volume 4: From the Arab Invasion to the Saljuqs. Cambridge: Cambridge University Press. pp. 136–161. ISBN 0-521-20093-8.
- Madelung, W. (1975). "The Minor Dynasties of Northern Iran". In Frye, R.N. (ed.). The Cambridge History of Iran, Volume 4: From the Arab Invasion to the Saljuqs. Cambridge: Cambridge University Press. pp. 198–249. ISBN 978-0-521-20093-6.
- Rezakhani, Khodadad (2017). ReOrienting the Sasanians: East Iran in Late Antiquity. Edinburgh University Press. pp. 1–256. ISBN 9781474400305.

Preceded by Nasr I	Amir of the Samanids; 892–907	Succeeded by Ahmad Samani
