= Ahmad ibn Asad =

- Amir of Ferghana and Samarkand; Shahanshah
- Reign: Ferghana: (819 – 864/865); Samarkand: (851/852 – 864/865)
- Predecessor: Samarkand: Nuh; Shash: Yahya
- Successor: Ferghana: Nasr I Samarkand: Nasr I Shash: Ya'qub
- Issue: Nasr I Isma'il ibn Ahmad
- House: Samanid
- Father: Asad ibn Saman

Ahmad ibn Asad (d. 864/865) was a Samanid Amir of Ferghana (819-864/5) and Samarkand (851/2-864/5). He was a son of Asad.

In 819, Ahmad was granted authority over the city of Ferghana by Caliph Al-Ma'mun's governor of Khorasan, Ghassan ibn 'Abbad, as a reward for his support against the rebel Rafi' ibn Laith. Following the death of his brother Nuh, who ruled in Samarkand, Ahmad and another brother Yahya were given rule over the city by Abdallah, the governor of Khurasan. Yahya's power was subsequently significantly curtailed by Ahmad, and he may have ruled as simply a figurehead until his death in 855. Yahya's line was then superseded by Ahmad's. By the time of Ahmad's death in 864 or 865, he was the ruler of most of Transoxiana, Bukhara and Khwarazm. Samarkand went to one son, Nasr I, while Shash went to another son, Ya'qub.

== Sources ==
- Frye, R.N. (1975). "The Sāmānids". In Frye, R.N. (ed.). The Cambridge History of Iran, Volume 4: From the Arab Invasion to the Saljuqs. Cambridge: Cambridge University Press. pp. 136–161. ISBN 0-521-20093-8.

New title	Amir of Ferghana; 819–864/5	Succeeded by Nasr I
New title	Amir of Samarkand; 851/2–864/5	Succeeded by Nasr I
Preceded by Yahya ibn Asad	Amir of Shash; 850s–864/5	Succeeded by Ya'qub ibn Ahmad
