= Yahya ibn Asad =

Samanid

Yahya ibn Asad (died 855) was a Samanid ruler of Shash (819–855) and Samarkand (851/852–855). He was a son of Asad.

In 819, Yahya was granted authority over the city of Shash by Caliph Al-Ma'mun's governor of Khurasan, Ghassan ibn 'Abbad, as reward for his support against the rebel Rafi' ibn Laith. Following the death of his brother Nuh, who ruled in Samarkand, Yahya and another brother Ahmad were given rule over the city by Abdallah, the governor of Khurasan. Yahya's power was subsequently significantly curtailed by Ahmad, and he may have ruled as simply a figurehead until his death in 855. Yahya's line was then superseded by Ahmad's.

== Sources ==
- Frye, R.N. (1975). "The Sāmānids". In Frye, R.N. (ed.). The Cambridge History of Iran, Volume 4: From the Arab Invasion to the Saljuqs. Cambridge: Cambridge University Press. pp. 136–161. ISBN 0-521-20093-8.

Preceded by —	Samanid Ruler (in Shash); 819–855	Succeeded by Ahmad
Preceded by Nuh	Samanid Ruler (in Samarkand, with Ahmad); 851/2–855	Succeeded by Ahmad
