= Samanid Empire =

819–999 Sunni Iranian empire in Central Asia

Samanid Empire سامانیان Sāmāniyān
- 819–999
- Capital: Samarkand (819–892); Bukhara (892–999)
- Official languages: Persian (lingua franca, court, academia, literary), Arabic (theology, bureaucracy)
- Common languages: Sogdian and other Eastern Iranian languages (as a vernacular)
- Religion: Sunni Islam; Minority religions: Shia Islam; Zoroastrianism
- Demonym: Samanid
- Government: Hereditary monarchy
- Amir
  - 819–864/5: Ahmad ibn Asad
  - 999: Abd al-Malik II
- Historical era: Middle Ages
  - Established: 819
  - Samanid Civil War of 888: 888
  - Ghaznavid–Samanid war & Karakhanid–Samanid wars: 999

Area
- 928 est.: 2,850,000 km^{2} (1,100,000 sq mi)
Preceded by
| Saffarid dynasty |
| Abbasid Caliphate |
| Alid dynasties of northern Iran |
| Banijurids |
| Bukhar Khudahs |
| Principality of Ushrusana |
| Principality of Farghana |
| Sogdia |
Succeeded by
| Ghaznavid dynasty |
| Karakhanids |
| Banu Ilyas |
| Farighunids |
| Muhtajids |
| Buyid dynasty |

The Samanid Empire (Persian: سامانیان, romanized: Sāmāniyān) (Note: Also known as the Samanian Empire, Samanid dynasty, Samanid amirate, or simply as the Samanids.) was a Persianate Sunni Muslim empire, ruled by a dynasty of Iranian dehqan origin, from 819 to 999. The empire was centred in Khorasan and Transoxiana, and at its greatest extent included northeastern Iran and Central Asia.

The Samanid dynasty originated with four brothers: Nuh, Ahmad, Yahya, and Ilyas, who were made governors of territories under Abbasid suzerainty in 819. In 892, Ismail Samani, son of Ahmad, united the Samanids under his rule. It was also under him that the Samanids became effectively independent of the Abbasids. However, by 945, the government had fallen under the de facto control of the Turkic military slave faction, and the Samanid family's authority had become purely symbolic.

The Samanid Empire is part of the Iranian Intermezzo, which saw the creation of a Persianate culture and identity that brought Iranian speech and traditions into the fold of the Islamic world. This later contributed to the formation of the Turco-Persian culture.

The Samanids were patrons of the arts, leading to advancements in science and literature, and as a result attracted scholars such as Rudaki, Ferdowsi, and Avicenna. Under Samanid rule Bukhara was said to rival Baghdad in its glory. Scholars note that the Samanids did more to revive Persian language and culture than did the Buyids or the Saffarids, all the while continuing to use Arabic for science and religion. They considered themselves to be descendants of the Sasanian Empire. In a famous edict, the Samanids declare that "here, in this region, the language is Persian, and the kings of this realm are Persian kings."

== History ==
=== Origins ===
The Samanid dynasty was descended from Saman Khuda, a dehqan of Iranian origin from the village of Saman in Balkh province, in present-day northern Afghanistan. The earliest appearance of the Samanid family appears to be in Khorasan rather than Transoxiana. In some sources, the Samanids claimed to be descended from the House of Mihran of Bahram Chobin. This claim is further supported by a geographical treatise from the second half of the 8th century, compiled by five Tuyuhun men and translated into the Tibetan language. In this chronicle, it is mentioned that the descendants of Bahram Chobin migrated to Balkh and settled there. According to Lev Gumilev, they were considered the ancestors of the Samanids. A few medieval sources such as Rashīd al-Dīn's Jāmiʿ al-tawārīkh claimed that the House of Saman belonged to the Oghuz Turks, although this is considered unlikely; others have given them a Sogdian origin, or a Hephthalite princely background.

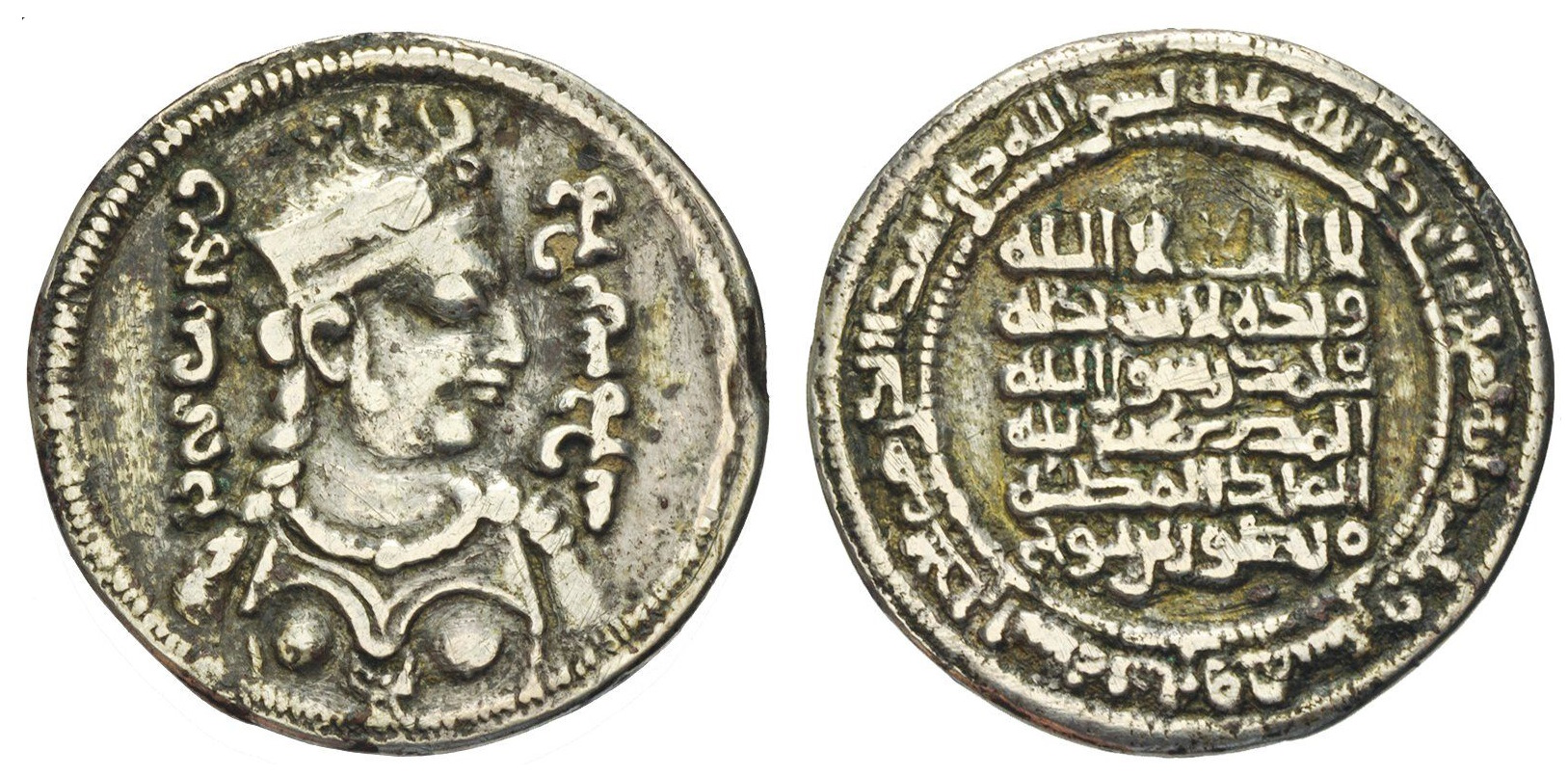
Silver medallion of the Samanid ruler Mansur I, dated AH 358 (968/9), with bilingual Middle Persian and Arabic minted in Bukhara. The obverse is extremely similar to that of the Western Turk Kaghan Zik (r. 610–618). Obverse in Middle Persian: "the King of Kings has increased the royal splendor" Reverse in Arabic: "There is no god but Allah, the One, there is no partner to Him, Muhammad is the messenger of Allah, al-Muti' lillah, the victorious king, Mansur son of Nuh."

Al-Farghani identifies the village of Saman as min al-bahārima, most likely referring to bahār diza (the castle monastery), a royal district in Balkh once belonging to one of the last northern Hephthalite rulers, Nezak Tarkhan, before his execution in 710. Further evidence for this Bactrian-Hephthalite connection is supported by numismatics. In 968–969, Samanid ruler Mansur ibn Nuh commissioned a celebratory medallion for Nowruz, the portrait on said medallion deliberately rejects standard Sasanian iconography in favour of Hephthalite styles; the prominent nose, heavy-lidded eyes, receding chin and a winged crown closely mimic the "Nizak Malik" coinage of the 6th and 7th centuries, suggesting that even centuries later, the Samanid rulers may have been consciously asserting their ancestral links to the Hephthalite royal line. Other authors claim a similarity of this medallion with the coinage of the Western Turk Khagan Zik (r. 610–618).

Ali Anoonshahr criticizes the theory in relation to the coin, stating that "For one, we do not know if the person who designed the coin or his patrons knew the precise identity of images on Hephthalite numismatic models. In other words, both the artist and his patron may have understood their medallion as harking to the pre-Islamic kingly tradition of Balkh without realizing its direct connection to Nīzak or the Hephthalites." He adds that Samanid-era writings portray the Hephthalites negatively.

According to Luke Treadwell, Hephthalite princely background would explain the Samanids' rapid ascent under Caliph al-Ma'mun (r. 813–833). As Tokhari nobles, they shared a common background with the Caliph's mother who hailed from Badghis (nearby to Balkh and the main headquarters of Nezak Tarkhan), allowing them to integrate seamlessly with the maternal relatives who made up the Caliph's inner circle in Merv. Beyond that, being Hephthalite they were linguistically and politically distinct from the rebellious Sogdians of Transoxiana, making them a loyalist alternative that would ensure authority remained tethered to the Caliphate rather than to regional Sogdian interests. Thus with their unique blend of noble prestige, maternal connections, local expertise, and distinct political loyalty, the Samanids were the ideal candidates to stabilize the volatile Transoxiana region.

Originally a Zoroastrian, Saman Khuda converted to Islam during the governorship of Asad ibn Abdallah al-Qasri in Khorasan, and named his oldest son Asad in the governor's honour. In 819, the governor of Khorasan, Ghassan ibn Abbad, rewarded the four sons of Asad ibn Saman for their aid against the rebel Rafi ibn al-Layth. Nuh ibn Asad received Samarkand; Ahmad ibn Asad received Farghana; Yahya ibn Asad received Tashkent, and Ilyas ibn Asad received Herat.

=== Rise ===
==== The Samanids in Herat (819–857) ====
Ilyas died in 856, and his son Ibrahim ibn Ilyas became his successor. The Tahirid governor of Khorasan, Muhammad ibn Tahir, subsequently appointed him as the commander of his army, and sent him on an expedition against the Saffarid ruler Ya'qub ibn al-Layth in Sistan. After facing defeat in battle near Pushang in 857, he fled to Nishapur, only to be captured by Ya'qub al-Saffar and sent to Sistan as a hostage.

==== The Samanid dynasty in Transoxiana (819–892) ====
Map of Khorasan and Transoxiana.

In 839/40, Nuh seized Isfijab from the nomadic pagan Turks living in the steppe. Consequently, he had a wall constructed around the city to protect it from their attacks. He died in 841/2—his two brothers Yahya and Ahmad, were then appointed as the joint rulers of the city by the Tahirid governor of Khorasan. After Yahya died in 855, Ahmad took control over Châch, thus becoming the ruler of most of Transoxiana. He died in 864/5; his son Nasr I received Farghana and Samarkand, while his other son Ya'qub received Châch (areas around modern Tashkent/Chachkent).

Meanwhile, the Tahirids' authority had significantly weakened after suffering several defeats to Saffarid ruler Ya'qub al-Saffar. Hence, causing the Tahirids to lose their grip over the Samanids, who became more or less independent. Nasr I, used this opportunity to strengthen his authority by sending his brother Ismail to Bukhara, which was in an unstable condition after suffering from raids by the Afrighid dynasty of Khwarazm. When Ismail reached the city, he was warmly received by its inhabitants, who saw him as one who could restore order.

After not so long, disagreement over where to distribute tax money caused a conflict between the brothers. Ismail was eventually victorious in the dynastic struggle and took control of the Samanid state. However, Nasr had been the one who had been invested with Transoxiana, and the Abbasid caliphs continued to recognize him as the rightful ruler. Because of this, Ismail continued to recognize his brother as well, but Nasr was completely powerless, a situation that would continue until his death in August 892.

=== Final unification and height of power (892–907) ===
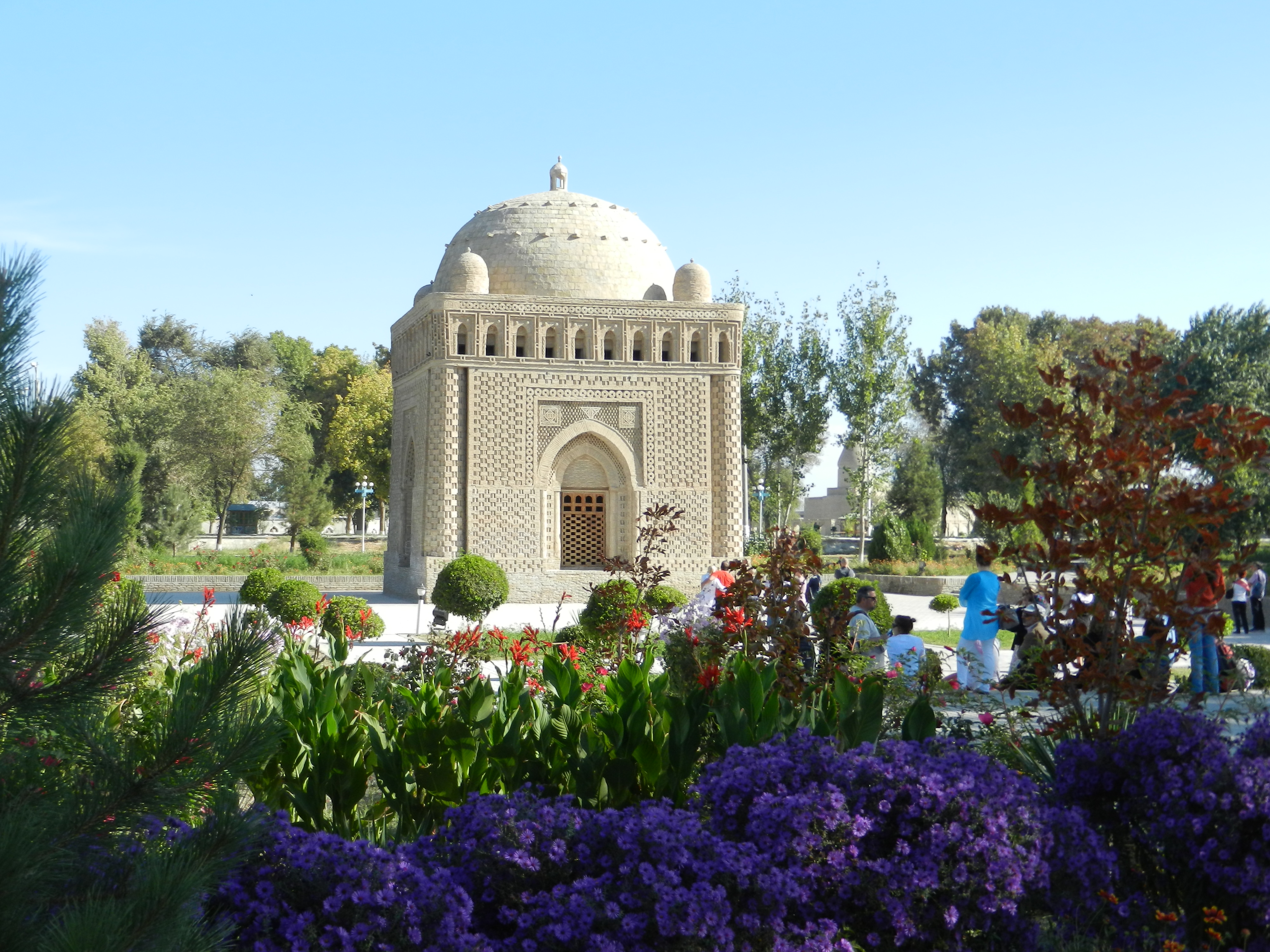
Picture of the Samanid Mausoleum, the burial site of Ismail Samani.

Following Nasr's death, Ismail moved the capital of the Samanid dynasty from Samarkand to Bukhara. A few months later the Saffarid emir, Ya'qub al-Saffar, also died and was succeeded by his brother Amr ibn al-Layth, who saw himself as the heir of the Saffarids. In the spring of 900, Amr clashed with Ismail near Balkh, but was defeated and taken into captivity. Ismail thereafter sent him to Baghdad, where he was executed. Ismail was thereafter recognized as the ruler of all of Khorasan and Transoxiana by the caliph. Furthermore, he also received the investiture over Tabaristan, Ray and Isfahan. It was also during this period that the Afrighid dynasty was forced into submission.

Before Ismail Samani's major victory against the Saffarids, he had made various expeditions in Transoxiana; in 892, he put an end to the Principality of Ushrusana by seizing all of its lands. During the same period, he put an end to the Bukhar Khudas in Bukhara. In 893, Ismail Samani invaded the territories of the Karluk Turks, taking Talas and converting the Nestorian church there into a mosque. The same year, he conducted a campaign to gather slaves, taking ten to fifteen thousand captives. The Samanid slave trade was the main trade income of the Samanid Empire, forming the base of economy of the state.

In 900, Ismail sent an army under Muhammad ibn Harun al-Sarakhsi against Muhammad ibn Zayd, the Zaydi ruler of Tabaristan and Gorgan. The invasion was successful; Muhammad ibn Zayd was killed and Tabaristan was conquered by the Samanids. However, Muhammad ibn Harun shortly revolted, forcing Ismail himself to invade the region the following year. Muhammad ibn Harun thereafter fled to Daylam, while Ismail reconquered Tabaristan and Gorgan. In 901, Amr Saffari was defeated at the battle of Balkh by the Samanids, which reduced the Saffarid dynasty to a minor tributary in Sistan. It was during this period that the Samanids were at their height of power, ruling as far as Qazvin in the west and Peshawar in the east.

Ismail is known in history as a competent general and a strong ruler; many stories about him are written in Arabic and Persian sources. Furthermore, because of his campaigns in the north, his empire was so safe from enemy incursions that the defences of Bukhara and Samarkand went unused. However, this later had consequences; at the end of the dynasty, the walls — earlier strong, but now falling apart — were greatly missed by the Samanids, who were constantly under attack by the Karakhanids and other enemies.

Ismail died in November 907, and was succeeded by his son Ahmad Samani (r. 907–914).

=== Intermediate period (907–961) ===
The Samanids and main Asian polities c. 900

Not long after his accession, Ahmad invaded Sistan; by 911, Sistan was under complete Samanid control, and Ahmad's cousin Abu Salih Mansur was appointed as its governor. Meanwhile, an Alid named Hasan al-Utrush was slowly re-establishing Zaydi over Tabaristan. In 913, Ahmad sent an army under Muhammad ibn Sa'luk to deal with him. Although the Samanid army was much larger, Hasan managed to emerge victorious. Ahmad, before he could plan another expedition to Tabaristan, was the following year murdered by some of his slaves in a tent near Bukhara. During his reign, Ahmad is also said to have replaced the language of the court from Persian to Arabic, which made him unpopular among his subjects, and forced him to change it back to Persian. After Ahmad's death, his eight-year-old son Nasr II (r. 914–943) succeeded him.

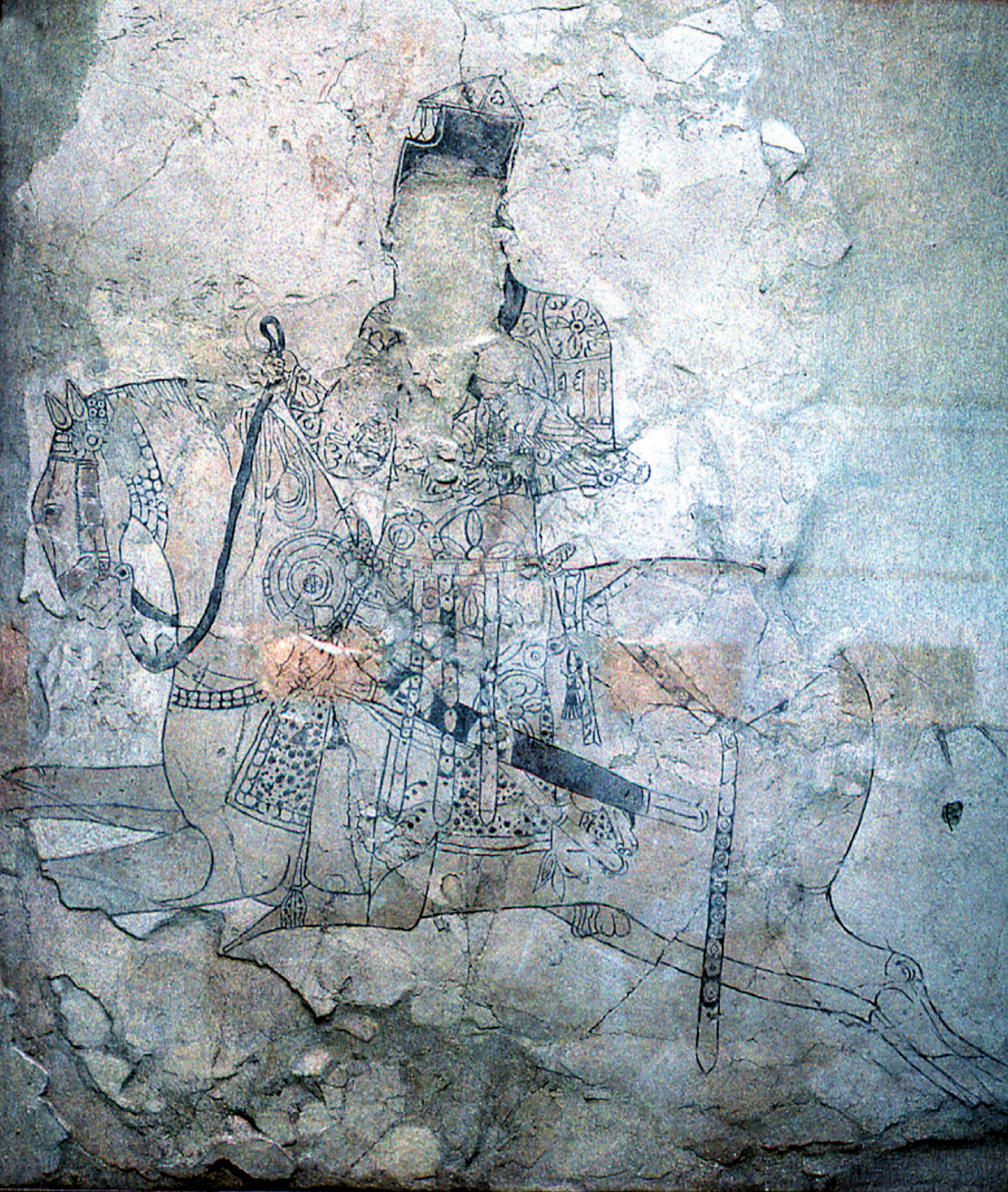
Wall painting of a mounted falconer in decorated caftan from Nīshāpūr area, Sāmānid, 10th century (Museum of Islamic Archaeology, Tehran, Iran).

Due to Nasr's youth, his prime minister Abu Abd Allah al-Jayhani took care over most of the state affairs. Al-Jayhani was not only an experienced administrator, but also a prominent geographer and greatly educated man. Almost right after Nasr II had ascended the throne, several revolts erupted, the most dangerous one being under his paternal grand-uncle, Ishaq ibn Ahmad, who seized Samarkand and began minting coins there, while his son Abu Salih Mansur seized Nishapur and several cities in Khorasan. Ishaq was eventually defeated and captured, while Abu Salih Mansur died of natural causes in 915. Some time later Nasr II once again had to deal with rebels; in 919, the governor of Khorasan, Husayn ibn Ali Marvarrudhi, rebelled against Samanid authority. Nasr responded by sending an army under Ahmad ibn Sahl to suppress the rebellion, which the latter managed to accomplish. After a few weeks, however, Ahmad shortly rebelled himself at Nishapur, made incursions into Gorgan, and then fortified himself in Merv to avoid a Samanid counter-attack. Nevertheless, the Samanid general Hamuya ibn Ali managed to lure Ahmad out of Merv, and defeated him in a battle at Marw al-Rudh; he was captured and imprisoned in Bukhara, where he remained until his death in 920.

At considerable expense, Nasr II b. Ahmad erected a new palace for himself and for his officials in Bukhara, in the ancient Rigistan region. In the west, Nasr II clashed several times with Daylamite and Gilite rulers. In 921, the Zaydids under the Gilite ruler Lili ibn al-Nu'man invaded Khorasan, but were defeated by the Simjurid general Simjur al-Dawati. Later in 930, a Dailamite military leader, Makan ibn Kaki, seized Tabaristan and Gurgan, and even took possession of Nishapur in western Khorasan. He was, however, forced to withdraw back to Tabaristan one year later, due to the threat that Samanids posed. Makan then returned to Tabaristan, where he was defeated by the Ziyarid ruler Mardavij, who managed to conquer the region. In 935, Nasr II re-established Samanid control in Gurgan and made Mardavij's successor Vushmgir his vassal. However, in 939 he declared independence, but was defeated the following year at Iskhabad.

In 943 several Samanid army officers, angry at Nasr's support of Isma'ili missionaries, formed a conspiracy to murder him. Nasr's son Nuh I, however, learned of the conspiracy. He went to a banquet designed to organize the plot and had the head of their leader cut off. To appease the other officers, he promised to stop the Isma'ili missionaries from continuing their activities. He then convinced his father to abdicate, who died of tuberculosis after a few months.

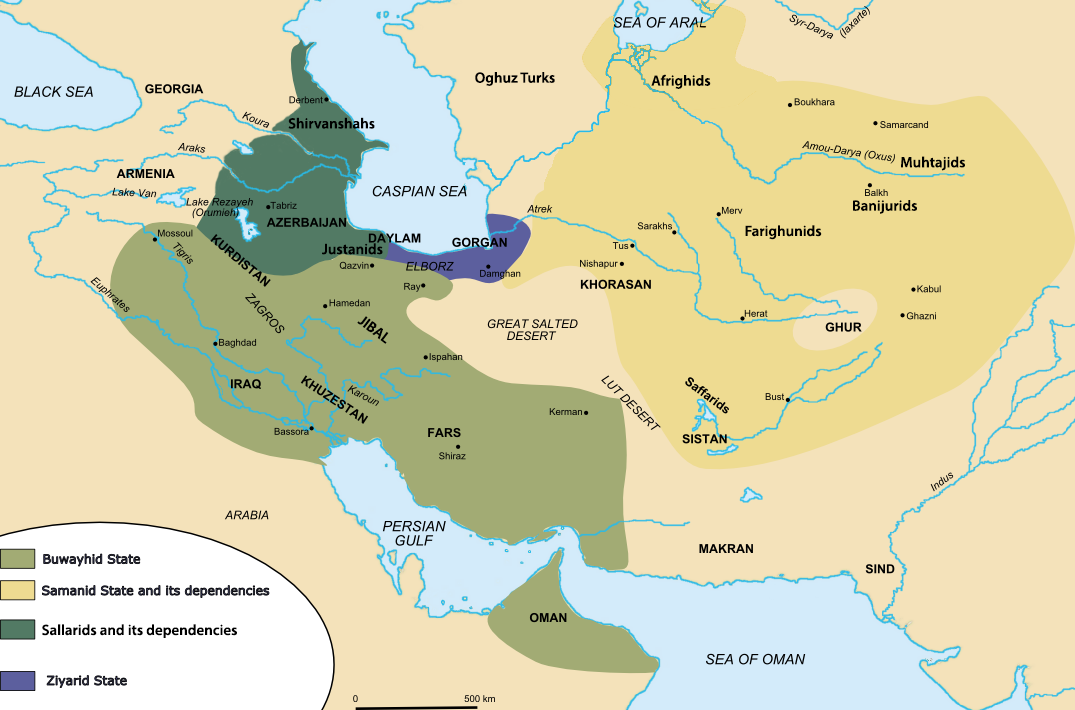
Iran in the mid-10th century.

Right when Nuh I ascended the throne, a revolt erupted in Khwarazm, which he managed to suppress. Later in 945, he had to deal with the Muhtajid ruler Abu Ali Chaghani, who refused to relinquish his post as governor of Khorasan to Ibrahim ibn Simjur. Abu Ali Chaghani then rebelled, and was joined by several prominent figures such as Abu Mansur Muhammad, whom he appointed as his commander-in-chief. In 947, he installed Nuh's uncle Ibrahim ibn Ahmad as amir in Bukhara. Abu Ali Chaghani then returned to his domains in Chaghaniyan. Ibrahim, however, was unpopular with the people of Bukhara, and Nuh soon retaliated by retaking the city and blinding Ibrahim and two brothers.

When Abu Ali Chaghani received the news of the re-capture of Bukhara, he once again marched towards it, but was defeated by an army sent by Nuh and withdrew back to Chaghaniyan. After some time, he left the region and tried to obtain support from other Samanid vassals. Meanwhile, Nuh had Chaghaniyan ravaged and its capital sacked. Another battle shortly ensued between Abu Ali Chaghani and a Samanid army in Tukharistan, which resulted in a Samanid victory. Fortunately for Abu Ali Chaghani, he managed to secure the support of other Samanid vassals, such as the rulers of Khuttal, and the Kumiji mountain people, but in the end made peace with Nuh, who allowed him to keep Chaghaniyan in return for sending his son Abu'l Muzaffar Abdallah as hostage to Bukhara.

By 945, the Turkic military slave faction (who were formerly recruited by the Samanid rulers in positions of governance) were fully in charge of the government. By this time, the Samanid family only held nominal power; similar to how the Buyids held de facto power over the Abbasid Caliphate around the same time.

Alp Tigin, nominal vassal of the Samanids, conquered Ghazna in 962 from the Lawik dynasty. The fifth of these commanders was Sebüktigin, who governed Ḡazna for twenty years till 387 AH/997 CE with the title (as it appears from his tomb inscription) of al-ḥājeb al-ajall (most noble commander). He would later be the founder of an independent dynasty based in Ghazna, following the decline of the Samanid Empire in the 990s.

=== Decline and fall (961–999) ===
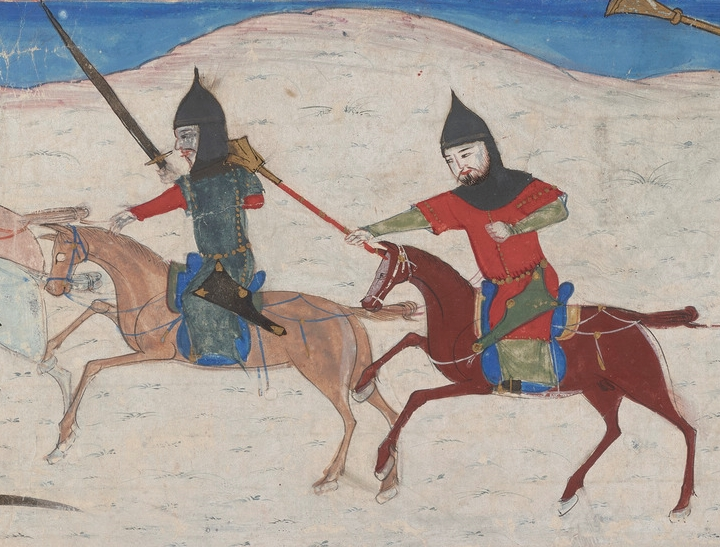
Nuh II suppressing a rebel. Majma' al-tawarikh, dated c. 1425.

The power of the Samanids began to crumble in the latter half of the 10th century. In 962, one of the ghulams, Alp Tigin, commander of the army in Khorasan, seized Ghazna and established himself there. His successors, however, including Sabuktigin, continued to rule as Samanid "governors". With the weakened Samanids facing rising challenges from the Karakhanids for control of Transoxiana, Sabuktigin later took control of all the provinces south of the Oxus and established the Ghaznavid Empire.

An Arab geographer remarked that, by 985, the Samanids possessed such large numbers of Turkic slaves that their dominance of the slave trade flooded the market and drove prices downward.

In 992, a Karakhanid, Harun Bughra Khan, grandson of the paramount tribal chief of the Karluk confederation Sultan Satuq Bughra Khan, captured Bukhara, the Samanid capital. Harun died shortly afterwards, however, and the Samanids returned to Bukhara. In 999, Nasr b. Ali, a nephew of Harun, returned and took possession of Bukhara, meeting little resistance. The Samanid domains were split up between the Ghaznavids, who gained Khorasan, and the Karakhanids, who received Transoxiana; the Oxus River thus became the boundary between the two rival empires.

=== Isma'il Muntasir's attempt to resurrect the Samanid state (1000–1005) ===
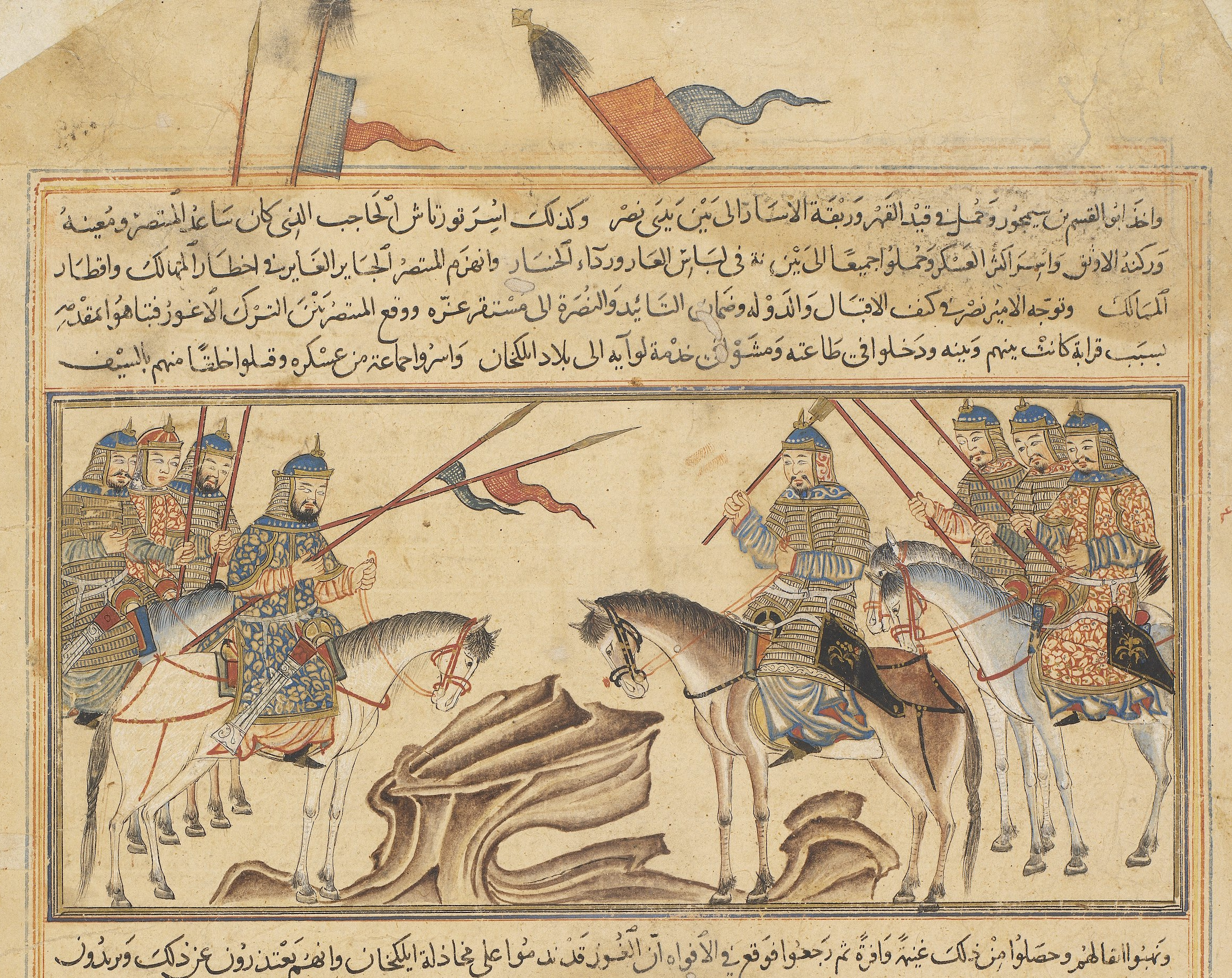
"Battle Between Abu'l-Qasim and the Samanid Muntasir". Jami al-Tawarikh, 1314–15.

Isma'il Muntasir was the youngest son of Nuh II—he was imprisoned by the Karakhanids after their conquest of Bukhara in 999. Some time later, Isma'il managed to escape to Khwarazm, where he gained support. Driving the Karakhanids out of Bukhara, he then moved on to and captured Samarkand. The approach of the Karakhanid army, however, forced Isma'il to give up all of his possessions, following which he travelled to Khorasan, where he captured Nishapur. Mahmud's army, however, made its way to the region, and Isma'il decided it necessary to flee again.

In 1003 Isma'il came back to Transoxiana, where he requested and received assistance from the Oghuz Turks of the Zarafshan valley. They defeated the Karakhanids in several battles, even when Nasr Khan was involved. For various reasons, however, Isma'il came to feel that he could not rely on the Oghuz to restore him, so he went back to Khorasan. He tried to gain Mahmud's support for a campaign to restore the Samanid state, but failed. Some time afterwards, he returned to the Zarafshan valley, where he gained the support of the Oghuz and others. A Karakhanid army was defeated in May 1004, but subsequently the Oghuz deserted Isma'il during another battle, and his army fell apart.

Fleeing to Khorasan yet again, Isma'il attempted to reenter Transoxiana in the end of 1004. The Karakhanids stopped this and Isma'il was nearly killed. Following this, he sought the hospitality of an Arab tribe near Merv. Their chief, however, killed Isma'il in 1005. His death marked the defeat of the last attempt to restore the Samanid state. Descendants of the Samanid family continued to live in Transoxiana where they were well regarded, but their power was relatively broken.

=== Iranian intermezzo ===
Along with several other states, the Samanid Empire was part of the Iranian Intermezzo, or "Persian renaissance". This period has been described as having a key importance in the formation of the Islamic civilization, both politically and culturally. In political terms, it saw an effective break up of the Abbasid power and the rise of several successor states such as the Samanids and Buyids while in cultural terms, it witnessed the rise of new Persian as an administrative and literary language.

== Culture ==
=== Government ===
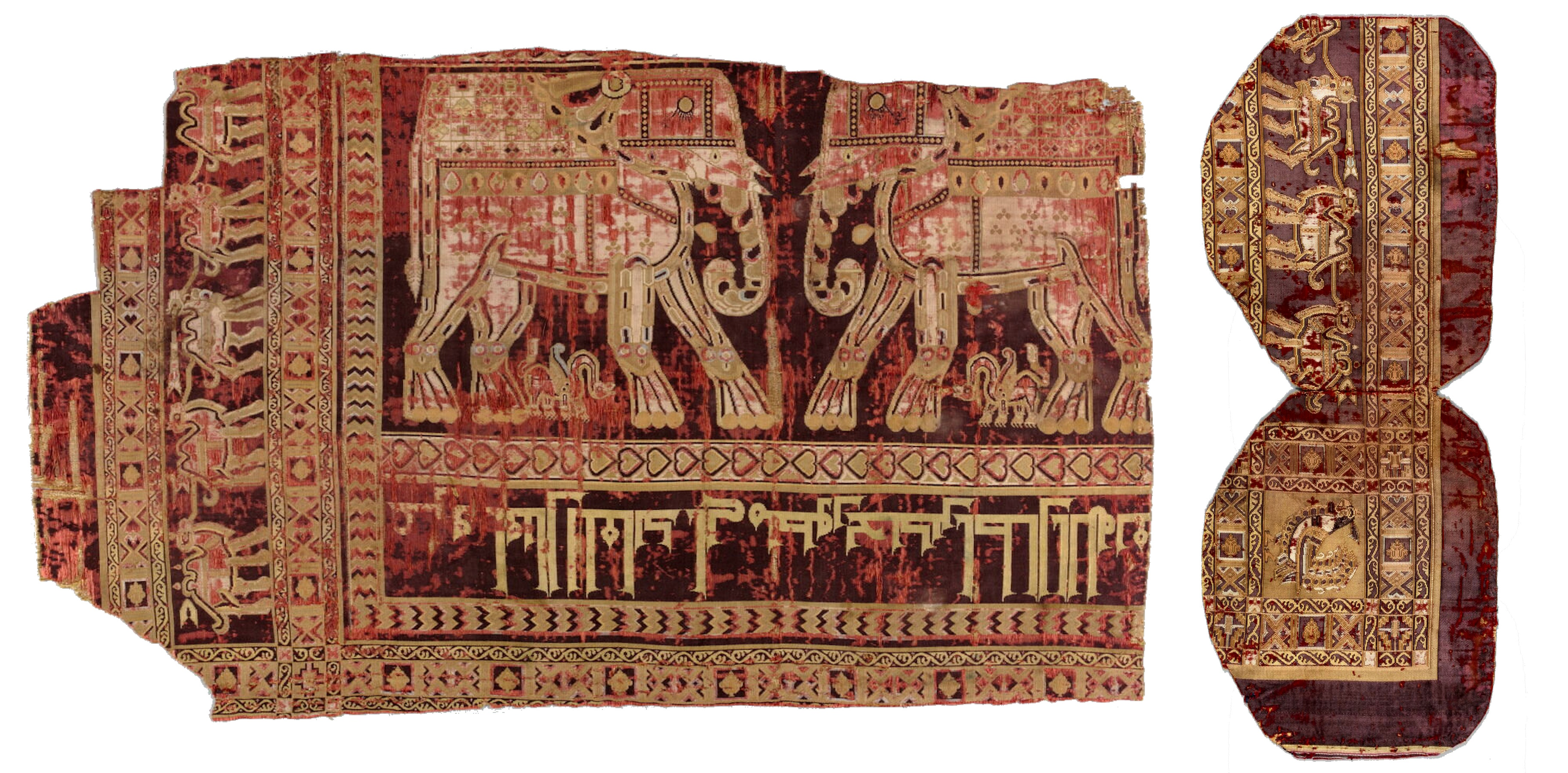
Silk textile, probably a saddle-cloth, made for Abū‘l-Mansūr Bukhtegīn (d. 961), a general under the Samanid ruler Abd al-Malik I. Known as the Suaire de Saint-Josse, Paris, Louvre, OA 7502.

The system of the Samanid state was modelled after the Abbasid system, which in turn was modelled after the Sasanian system. The ruler of the state was the amir, and the provinces were governed by appointed governors or local vassal rulers. The administrative, political and economic affairs were administered by the divan, and the Samanid bureaucracy used Arabic in its diplomatic discourses. The economy was managed by the mustawfi, diplomatic correspondence and important state papers by the diwanal-rasa'il, and the royal guard and military affairs by the sahib al-shurta. The main responsibility of both governors and local rulers was to collect taxes and support the Samanid ruler with troops if needed. The most important province in the Samanid Empire was Khorasan, which was initially given to a relative of the Samanid ruler or a local Iranian prince (such as the Muhtajids), but was later given to one of his most trusted slaves. The governor of Khorasan was normally the sipah-salar (commander-in-chief).

Like in the Abbasid Caliphate, Turkic slaves could rise to high office in the Samanid state, which would sometimes give them enough power to nearly make the ruler their puppet.

=== Cultural and religious efforts ===
The Samanids revived Persian culture by patronizing Rudaki, Bal'ami and Daqiqi. The Samanids determinedly propagated Sunni Islam, and repressed Ismaili Shiism but were more tolerant of Twelver Shiism. Islamic architecture and Islamo-Persian culture was spread deep into the heartlands of Central Asia by the Samanids. Following the first complete translation of the Qur'an into Persian in the 9th century, populations under the Samanid empire began accepting Islam in significant numbers. The arabization of the Samanids was clearly minimal compared to the almost entirely arabized Tahirids. Despite Arabic literature and science flourishing in the Samanid Empire, its distance from Baghdad allowed the Samanids to be a crucial element in the renaissance of New Persian language and culture. This Persianate culture variant was the first to use a language besides Arabic in Islamic culture.

Although the Zoroastrian population had previously been suppressed by the Abbasid Caliphate, according to al-Masudi, the Samanid empire (Note: Specifically Kirman, Sijistan, and Khorasan) still had fire-temples that were still being venerated by the present Zoroastrian population. Despite the fact that the Samanids professed Sunni Islam, however, they were much more tolerant towards its Zoroastrian population than the previous empires.

Through zealous missionary work as many as 30,000 tents of Turks came to profess Islam and later under the Ghaznavids more than 55,000 under the Hanafi school of thought. The mass conversion of the Turks to Islam eventually led to a growing influence of the Ghaznavids, who would later rule the region.

Under Nuh II, a Hanafi work, which was being used to contest Ismailism, was translated into Persian.

Agriculture and trading were the economic bases of the Samanid State. The Samanids heavily engaged in trade with Europe. Thousands of Samanid coins have been found in the Baltic and Scandinavia.

=== Literature ===
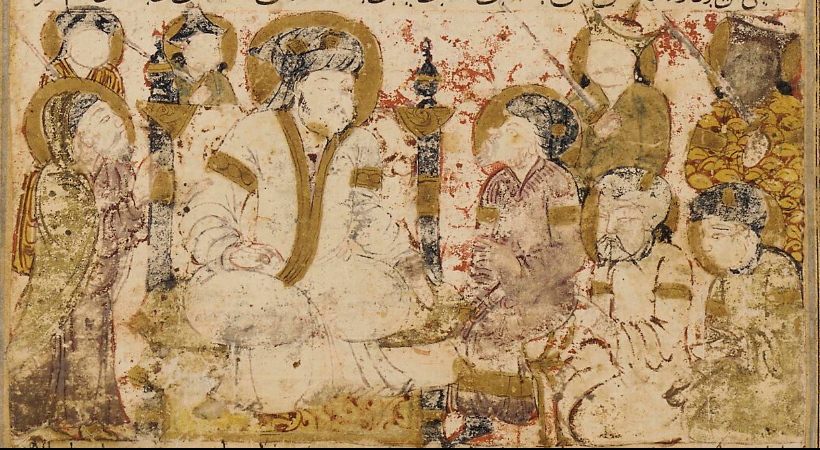
Miniature from an early 14th-century copy of the Samanid-period Tarikhnama of Bal'ami (d. 992–997 CE) depicting al-Saffah (r. 750–754) as he receives pledges of allegiance in Kufa. This is the earliest known extant prose book in the Persian language.

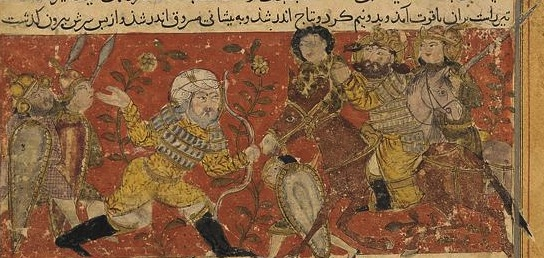
Miniature from an early 14th-century copy of the Samanid-period Tarikhnama of Bal'ami depicting the arrow of old Wahraz killing Masruq, the Ethiopian king of Yemen.

During the 9th and 10th centuries, there was a large amount of growth in literature, mostly in poetry. It was during the Samanid period that Persian literature appeared in Transoxiana and was formally recognized. The advancement of an Islamic New Persian literature thus started in Transoxiana and Khorasan instead of Fars, the homeland of the Persians. The best known poets of the Samanid period were Rudaki (d. 941), Daqiqi (d. 977) and Ferdowsi (d. 1020).

Although Persian was the most-favored language, Arabic continued to enjoy a high status and was still popular among the members of the Samanid family. For example, al-Tha'alibi wrote an Arabic anthology named Yatimat al-Dahr ("The Unique Pearl"). The fourth section of the anthology included a detailed account of the poets that lived under the Samanids. It also states that the poets of Khwarazm mostly wrote in Arabic.

The acknowledged founder of Persian classical poetry, and a man of great perception, was Rudaki, who was born in the village of Panjrudak, which is today part of the Panjakent District in Tajikistan. Rudaki was already becoming popular during his early years, due to his poems, his voice, and his great skill in using the chang (an Iranian instrument similar to the harp). He was shortly invited to the Samanid court, where he stayed almost the rest of his life. Fewer than 2,000 lines of his poetry have survived, but are enough to prove his great poetic skills—he perfected every basic verse form of medieval Persian poetry: mathnawi, qasida, ghazal and ruba'i.

Look at the cloud, how it cries like a grieving man
Thunder moans like a lover with a broken heart.
Now and then the sun peeks from behind the clouds
Like a prisoner hiding from the guard.

— Rudaki

Another prominent poet was Shahid Balkhi, born in the village of Jakhudanak near Balkh. Not much is known about his life, but he is mentioned as being one of the best poets in the court of Nasr II, and one of the best scholars of the age. He was also a student of Rudaki, and had close relations with him. He died in 936, a few years before Rudaki's death. His death saddened Rudaki, who afterwards wrote an emotional elegy about him.

Daqiqi, who was a native of Tus, began his career at the court of the Muhtajid ruler Abu'l Muzaffar ibn Muhammad in Chaghaniyan, and was later invited to the Samanid court. Under the Samanids, a special interest arose in ancient Iranian legends and heroic traditions, thus inspiring Daqiqi to write the Shahnameh ("The Book of Kings"), a long epic poem based on the history of the Iranians. However, by his death in 977, he had only managed to complete a small part of it, which was about the conflict between Gushtasp and Arjasp.

However, the most prominent poet of that age was Ferdowsi, born in Tus in 940 to a dehqan family. It was during his youth that there was a period of growth under the Samanids. The rapid growth of interest in ancient Iranian history made him continue the work of Daqiqi, completing the Shahnameh in 994, only a few years before the fall of the Samanid Empire. He later completed a second version of the Shahnameh in 1010, which he presented to the Ghaznavid Sultan Mahmud. However, his work was not as appreciated by the Ghaznavids as it had been by the Samanids.

=== Population ===
Under the Samanid Empire, the Zarafshan valley, Kashka Darya and Usrushana were populated by Sogdians; Tukharistan by the Bactrians; Khwarezm by the Khwarazmians; the Ferghana valley by the Ferghanans; southern Khorasan by Khorasanians; and the Pamir mountains and environs by the Saka and other early Iranian peoples. All these groups were of Iranian ethnicity and spoke dialects of Middle Iranian and New Persian. In the words of Negmatov, "they were the basis for the emergence and gradual consolidation of what became an Eastern Persian-Tajik ethnic identity."

=== Religion ===
Early Samanid amirs participated in the funerals of prominent religious scholars, with Ahmad ibn Asad and his son Nasr each leading funeral prayers on notable occasions. This practice continued under Isma'il Samani and Ya'qub ibn Ahmad, both of whom officiated at the funerals of distinguished religious scholars. Medieval sources describe Ahmad b. Asad as a learned and devout ruler, and report that at least four of his sons transmitted hadith, including traditions received from their father. According to Louise Marlow, these practices reflected a religious style inherited in part from the Tahirids, characterized by pious austerity (zuhd), the cultivation of religious learning, and adherence to the Prophetic example.

Following the suppression of a rebellion in Taraz, Isma'il Samani converted the town's church into a mosque. In 902, he expanded the Barmakid cathedral mosque in Bukhara, built by Yahya ibn Khalid in 794, and by 918 a minaret was added. During the reign of Abd al-Malik I, a mosque was built next to Nasr II's palace in Bukhara. During the reign of Mansur I, the cathedral mosque in Tus was embellished.

The Samanids played a major role in entrenching Sunni orthodoxy throughout Central Asia, while providing patronage to numerous Sunni theologians and religious scholars active in Bukhara and Samarqand. In the early tenth century, Isma'il Samani commissioned the Arabic treatise al-Sawad al-A'zam by al-Hakim al-Samarqandi, which defined the parameters of Sunni orthodoxy. According to its introduction, the al-Sawad al-A'zam sought to combat sectarianism in the Samanid realm by codifying the doctrinal consensus of Hanafi theologians in Transoxiana. In doing so, it denounced a number of groups as heretical, including Isma'ilis, Muʿtazilites, Kharijites, Murji'ites, Jabarites, Qadarites, Karramites, and Shafi'ites. Al-Sawad al-A'zam portrayed "heretics" and "sectarians" in Samarqand, Bukhara, and Transoxiana as opponents of the "path of the Sunna and the Muslim congregation," presenting Hanafi doctrine as the region's sole authentic ancestral tradition. Under Nuh II ibn Mansur, the treatise was translated into Persian and it was later adopted as the official catechism of the Samanid Empire. Despite this, within the Samanid Empire, religious leaders were often reluctant to enter government service, including accepting positions as judges.

=== Language ===
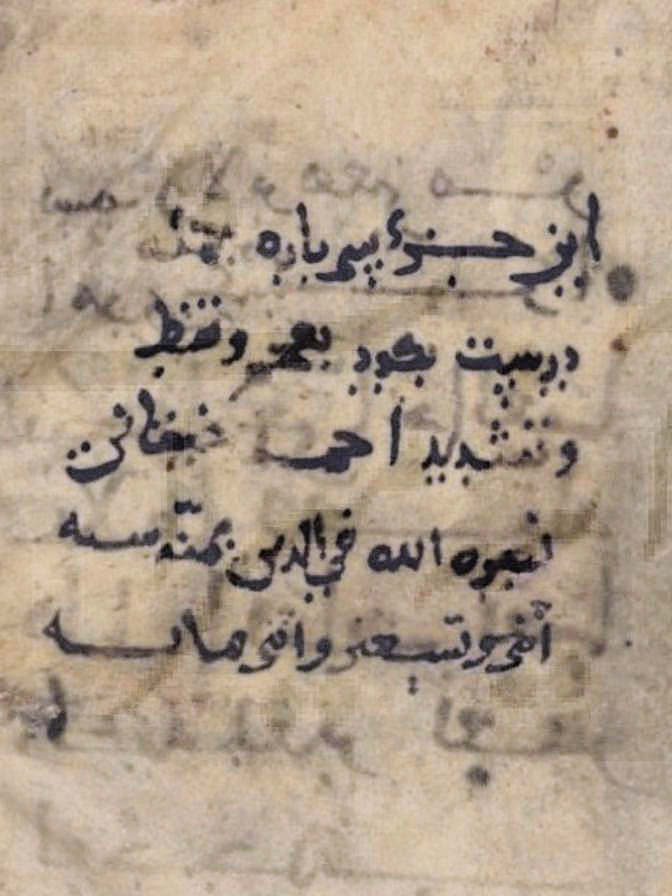
Persian notes on Quranic booklets, written by a native of Tus called Ahmad Khayqani in 292 AH (905 CE).

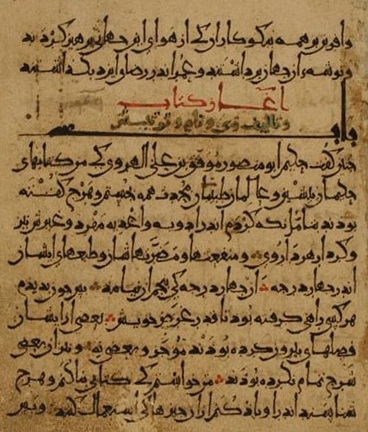
A page from a manuscript of "Kitab al-Abniya 'an Haqa'iq al-Adwiya" by Abu Mansur Muwaffaq, Copied by Asadi Tusi in 447 AH (1055 CE).

Ordinary people in the Samanid realm continued to speak local languages such as Sogdian and Khwarezmian, although Ferghana, Samarkand, and Bukhara were starting to be linguistically Persianized. The spread of the Persian language eventually led to the extinction of the local Eastern Iranian languages, with only a tiny amount of Sogdian-descended Yaghnobi speakers remaining among the now Persian-speaking Tajik population of Central Asia. In subsequent centuries, Persian maintained its importance in major cities like Samarkand and Bukhara, even after the spread of Turkic languages and the rise of Turkic dynasties in the region.

=== Intellectual life ===
In the 9th and 10th centuries, intellectual life in Transoxiana and Khorasan reached a high level. In the words of N. N. Negmatov, "It was inevitable that the local Samanid dynasty, seeking support among its literate classes, should cultivate and promote local cultural traditions, literacy and literature."

The main Samanid towns—Bukhara, Samarkand, Balkh, Merv, Nishapur, Khujand, Bunjikath, Hulbuk, Termez and others, became the major cultural centres under the state. Scholars, poets, artists and other men of education from many Muslim countries assembled in the Samanid capital of Bukhara, where a rich soil was created for the prosper of creative thought, thus making it one of the most distinguished cultural centres of the Eastern world. An outstanding library known as Siwān al-Hikma ("Storehouse of Wisdom") was put together in Bukhara, known for its various types of books.

=== Arts ===
Due to extensive excavations at Nishapur, Iran, in the mid-twentieth century, Samanid pottery is well-represented in Islamic art collections around the world. These ceramics are largely made from earthenware and feature either calligraphic inscriptions of Arabic proverbs, or colorful figural decorations. The Arabic proverbs often speak to the values of "Adab" culture—hospitality, generosity, and modesty.

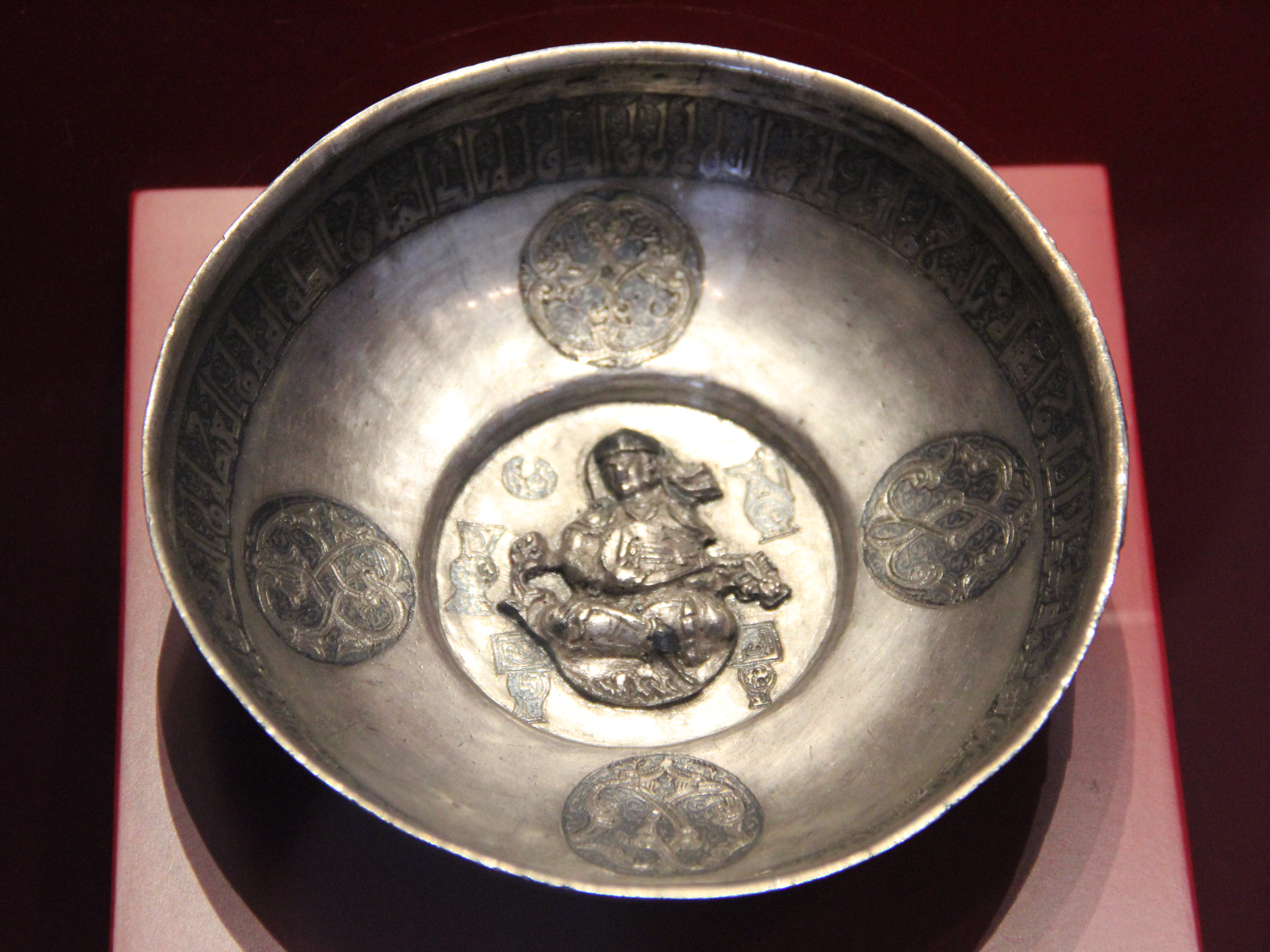
Lute player. Samanid (or Seljuk) metal work, Khorezm, 10th century. Islamic Art Museum (Museum für Islamische Kunst), Berlin.

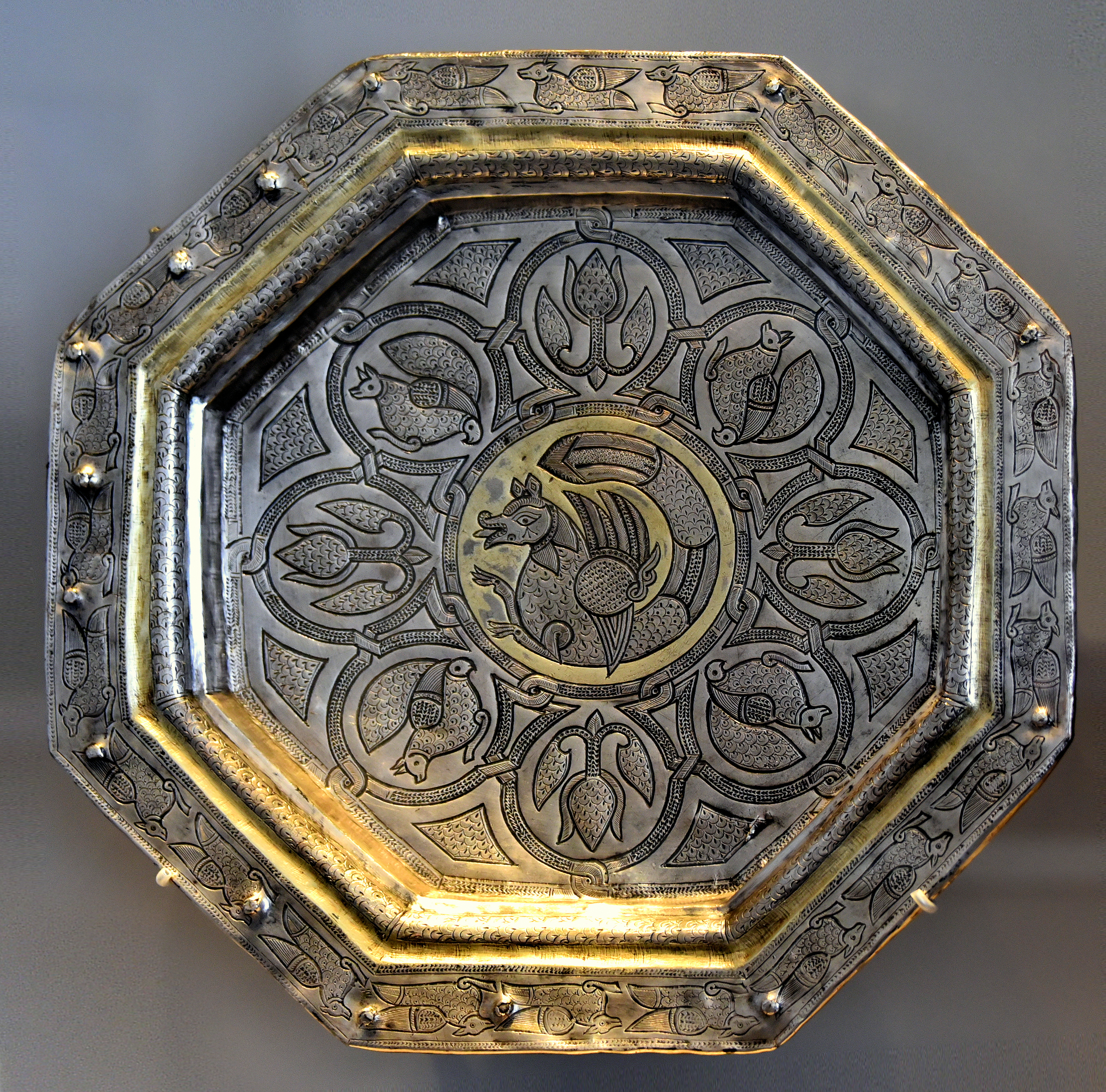
"Simurgh platter", Iran, Samanid dynasty. 9th-10th century. Islamic Art Museum (Museum für Islamische Kunst), Berlin.

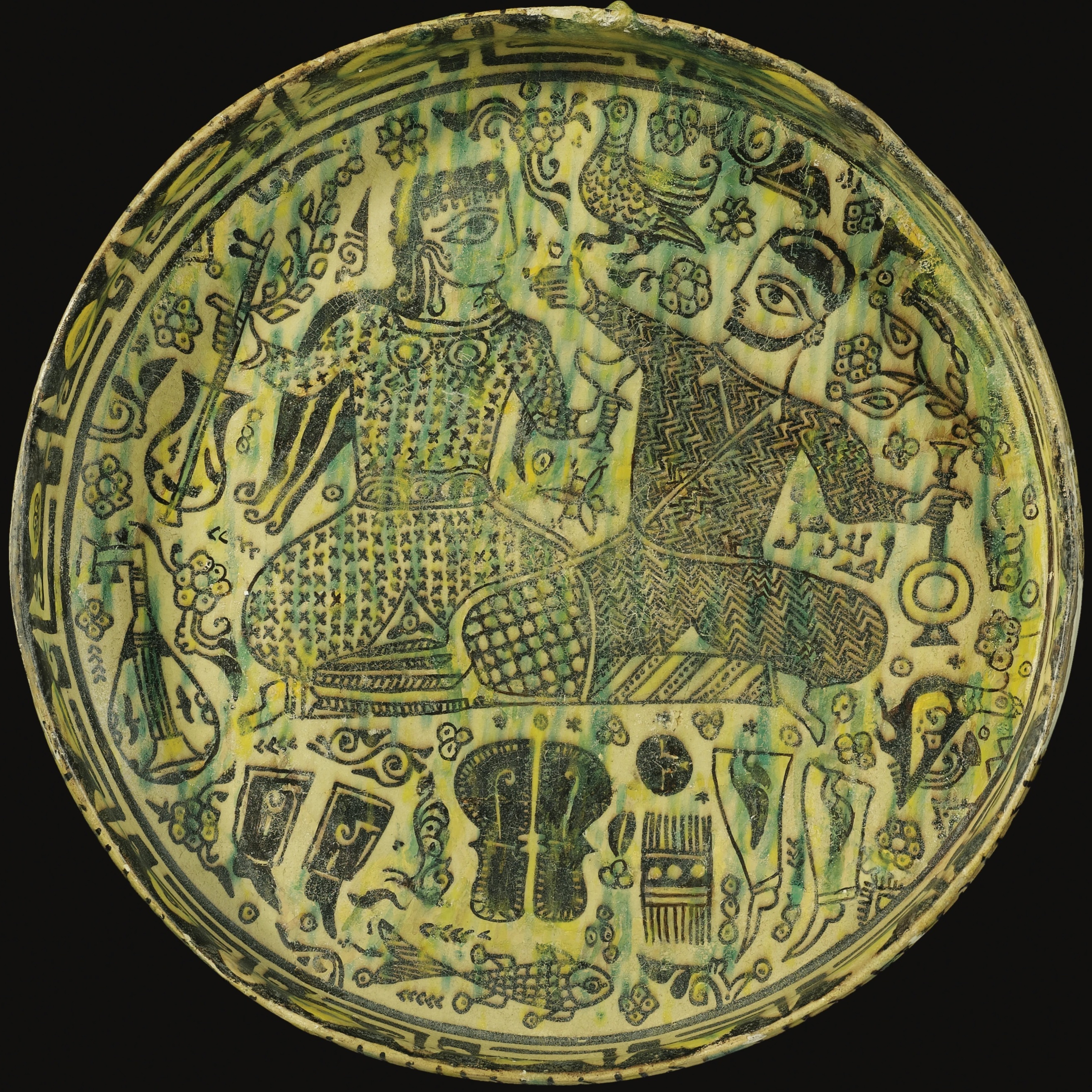
10th-century Samanid earthenware, probably produced in Nishapur, depicting a convivial scene with a couple, accompanied by the Persian inscription nush kon (“Drink!”) and the Arabic inscription laka (“For you”), both in Kufic script.

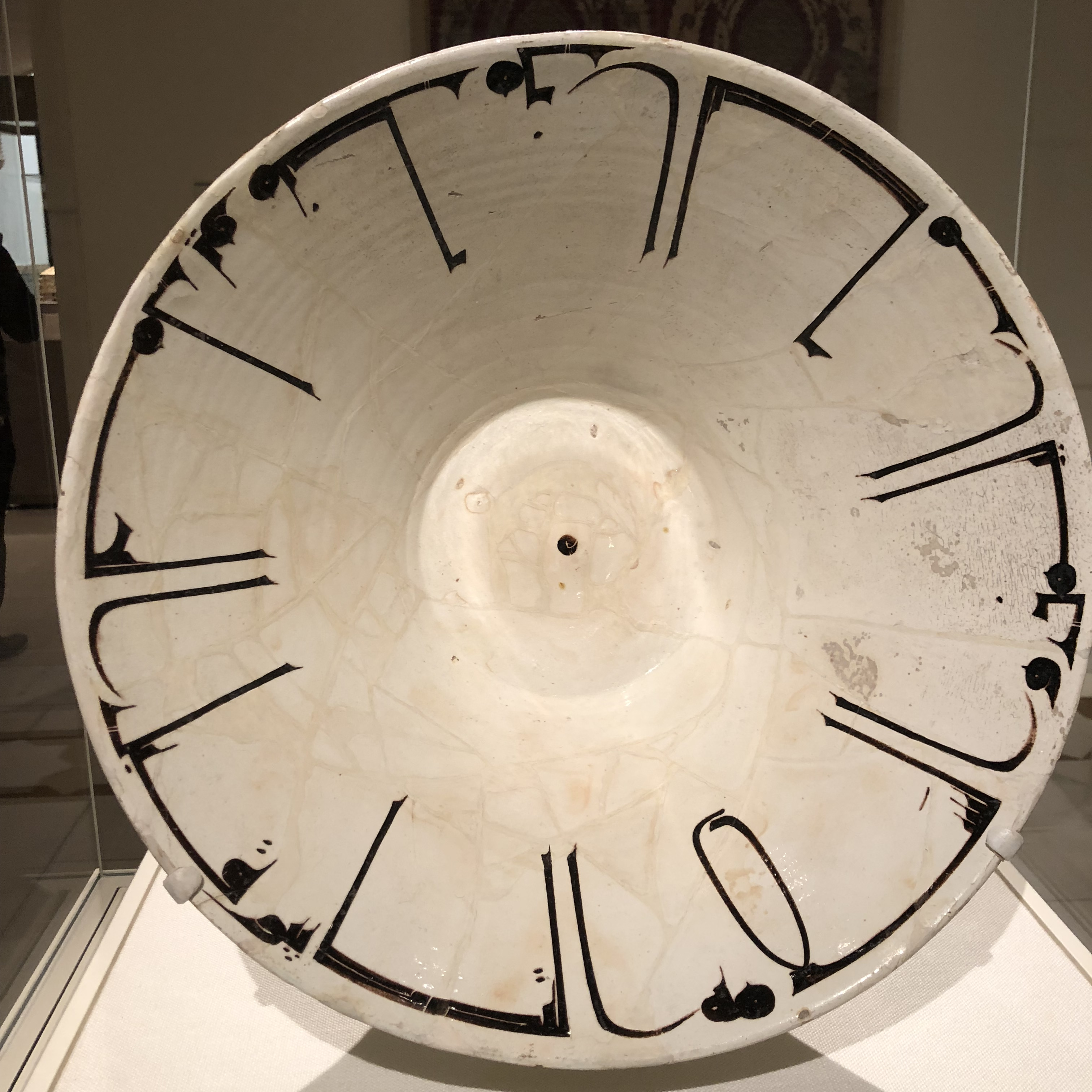
Bowl with Arabic inscription "Planning before work protects you from regret; prosperity and peace", 10th century CE, Iran.

== Legacy ==
In commending the Samanids, the epic Persian poet Ferdowsi says of them:

کجا آن بزرگان ساسانیان
ز بهرامیان تا به سامانیان

"Where have all the great Sasanians gone?
From the Bahrāmids to the Samanids what has come upon?"

A Bukharan historian writing in 943 stated that Ismail Samani:

was indeed worthy and right for padishahship. He was an intelligent, just, compassionate person, one possessing reason and prescience...he conducted affairs with justice and good ethics. Whoever tyrannized people he would punish...In affairs of state he was always impartial.

The celebrated scholar Nizam al-Mulk, in his famous work Siyasatnama, stated that Ismail Samani:

was extremely just, and his good qualities were many. He had pure faith in God (to Him be power and glory) and he was generous to the poor – to name only one of his notable virtues.

== In modern Tajikistan ==
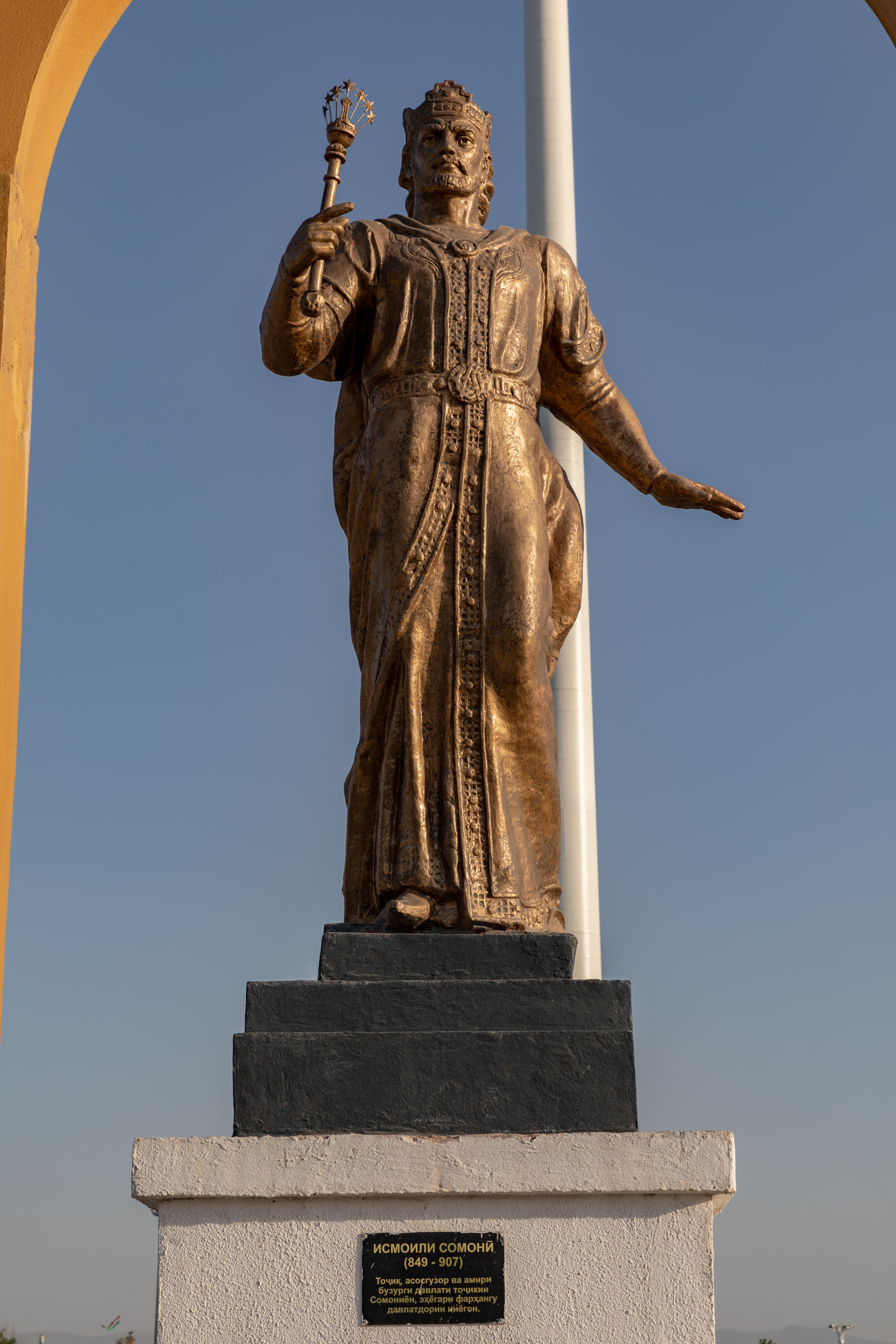
Statue of Ismail Samani in Dushanbe, Tajikistan. The plaque describes him as the Tajik amir of the Tajik state of the Samanids.

In modern Tajikistan, the Samanids are portrayed as the first "Tajik" state, with Ismail Samani as its founder. This forms a part of "the construction and propagation of Tajik identity by [Tajikistan's president] Emomali Rahmon" and greatly relies on the interpretations of Soviet-era scholars such as Bobodzhan Gafurov. These efforts have been described as part of a "drive for authenticity" and as "rewriting history". In 1999, William O. Beeman wrote: "The Samanids make ideal symbols. They were Sunni Muslims, predating the establishment of Shi'ism as a state religion in Iran. They are primarily known for their cultural patronage rather than their religious beliefs, and their civilization spans the geographic region encompassing all of the territories Tajiks see as their cultural realm." Per Paul Bergne, "The fact that the Samanid capital Bukhara is now in Uzbekistan has, since the establishment of Tajikistan, rankled with many nationalist Tajik historians. For their part, Uzbek patriots react to this Tajik grievance with a mixture of irritation and suspicion." According to Muriel A. Atkin, the Samanids would not have approved of their classification as Tajiks separate from the larger Persian-speaking community.

== List of rulers ==
=== Emirs of Herat ===
1. Ilyas, son of Asad ibn Saman, 819–856
2. Ibrahim, son of Ilyas, 856–867

Samanid domains in Herat fell to Saffarids in 867.

=== Emirs of Samarkand ===
1. Nuh, son of Asad ibn Saman, 819–841
2. Ahmad, son of Asad ibn Saman, 841–855

=== Emirs of Shash ===
1. Yahya, son of Asad ibn Saman, 819–855

Taken over by Ahmad ibn Asad in 855.

=== Emirs of Transoxiana ===
1. Ahmad, son of Asad ibn Saman, 855–864
2. Nasr I, son of Ahmad 864–892
3. Isma'il I, son of Ahmad, 892–907
4. Ahmad, son of Isma'il I, 907–914
5. Nasr II, son of Ahmad, 914–943
6. Nuh I, son of Nasr II, 943–947, 947–954
7. Ibrahim, son of Ahmad, 947
8. Abd al-Malik I, son of Nuh I, 954–961
9. Mansur I, son of Nuh I, 961–976
10. Nuh II, son of Mansur I, 976–992, 992–997
11. Abd al-Aziz, son of Nuh I, 992
12. Mansur II, son of Nuh II, 997–999
13. Abd al-Malik II, son of Nuh II, 999–1000
14. Isma'il II, son of Nuh II, 1000–1005

== Family Tree ==
Family tree of Samanids

Saman
Asad
Nuh r. 819–841 | Ahmad r. 819–864 | Yahya r. 819–855 | Ilyas r. 819–856
Nasr I r. 864–892 | Isma'il I r. 892–907 | Ibrahim r. 856–867
Ahmad r. 907–914
Ibrahim r. 947 | Nasr II r. 914–943
Nuh I r. 943–954
Abd al-Malik I r. 954–961 | Mansur I r. 961–976 | Abd al-Aziz r. 992
Nuh II r. 976–997
Mansur II r. 997–999 | Abd al-Malik II r. 999–1000 | Isma'il II r. 1000–1005

== See also ==
- Iranian Intermezzo
- List of kings of Iran
- List of Sunni Muslim dynasties
- Samanid Epigraphic Ware

== Sources ==
- Ayoub, Mahmoud (2013). Islam Faith and History. Oneworld Publishers. ISBN 978-1851683482.
- Bartold, Vasily (1928). Turkestan Down to the Mongol Invasion. Translated by Gibb, H. A. R. E.J.W. Gibb Memorial.
- Bergne, Paul (2007). The Birth of Tajikistan: National Identity and the Origins of the Republic. I.B.Tauris. ISBN 978-1-84511-283-7.
- Blair, Sheila, ed. (1992). The Monumental Inscriptions from Early Islamic Iran and Transoxiana. Vol. V. E.J. Brill.
- Bregel, Yuri (2003). An Historical Atlas of Central Asia. Vol. 9. Brill. ISBN 9789004123212.
- Bosworth, C.E. (1963). The Ghaznavids: Their Empire in Afghanistan and Eastern Iran, 994-1040. Edinburgh at the University Press.
- Bosworth, C. E. (1968). "The Development of Persian Culture under the Early Ghaznavids". Iran. 6: 33–44. doi:10.2307/4299599. JSTOR 4299599.
- Bosworth, C. E. (1973). "The Heritage of Rulership in Early Islamic Iran and the Search for Dynastic Connections with the Past". Iran. 11. Taylor & Francis: 51–62. doi:10.2307/4300484. JSTOR 4300484.
- Bosworth, C. E. (1975). "The Țāhirids and Şaffārids". In Frye, Richard N. (ed.). The Cambridge History of Iran: From the Arab Invasion to the Saljuqs. Vol. 4. Cambridge: Cambridge University Press. pp. 90–135. ISBN 0-521-20093-8.
- Bosworth, C. E. (1984). "ĀL-E MOḤTĀJ". In Yarshater, Ehsan (ed.). Encyclopædia Iranica. Vol. I/7: Ahriman–Alafrank. London and New York: Routledge & Kegan Paul. pp. 764–766. ISBN 978-0-71009-096-6.
- Bosworth, C. E. (1984a). "AḤMAD B. SAHL B. HĀŠEM". In Yarshater, Ehsan (ed.). Encyclopædia Iranica. Vol. I/6: Afghanistan–Ahriman. London and New York: Routledge & Kegan Paul. pp. 643–644. ISBN 978-0-71009-095-9.
- Bosworth, Clifford Edmund (2004). The New Islamic Dynasties: A Chronological and Genealogical Manual. Columbia University Press. ISBN 9780748621378.
- Bosworth, C. E. (2011). The Ornament of Histories: A History of the Eastern Islamic Lands AD 650–1041: The Persian Text of Abu Sa'id 'Abd Al-Hayy Gardizi. I.B.Tauris. pp. 1–169. ISBN 978-1-84885-353-9.
- Daniel, Elton (2001). The History of Iran. The Greenwood Histories of the Modern Nations. Westport, CT: Greenwood Press. ISBN 978-0-313-30731-7.
- Donner, Fred M. (1999). "Muhammad and the Caliphate: Political history of the Islamic Empire up to the Mongol Conquest". In Esposito, John L. (ed.). The Oxford History of Islam. Oxford University Press.
- Flury, Samuel (1925). "Le décor épigraphique des monuments de Ghazna". Syria: 61=90.
- Frye, Richard N. (1965). Bukhara: The Medieval Achievement. University of Oklahoma Press.
- Frye, R.N. (1975). "The Sāmānids". In Frye, Richard N. (ed.). The Cambridge History of Iran: From the Arab Invasion to the Saljuqs. Vol. 4. Cambridge: Cambridge University Press. pp. 136–161. ISBN 0-521-20093-8.
- Grousset, Renee (1991). The Empire of the Steppes:A History of Central Asia. Translated by Walford, Naomi. Rutgers University Press.
- Litvinsky, Ahmad Hasan Dani (1998). History of Civilizations of Central Asia: Age of Achievement, A.D. 750 to the end of the 15th-century. UNESCO. ISBN 9789231032110.
- Madelung, W. (1975). "The Minor Dynasties of Northern Iran". In Frye, R.N. (ed.). The Cambridge History of Iran, Volume 4: From the Arab Invasion to the Saljuqs. Cambridge: Cambridge University Press. pp. 198–249. ISBN 978-0-521-20093-6.
- Minorsky, V. (1938). "Geographical Factors in Persian Art". Bulletin of the School of Oriental Studies, University of London. 9 (3): 621–652.
- Minorsky, V. (2000). "Tus". In Bearman, P. J.; Bianquis, TH.; BOSWORTH, C. E.; Van Donzel, E.; Heinrichs, W. P. (eds.). Encyclopaedia of Islam. Vol. X: T - U. Brill. pp. 740–744. ISBN 90 04 11211 1.
- Marlow, Louise (2015). "The khassa and the 'amma: Intermediaries in the Samanid Polity". In Peacock, A. C. S.; Tor, D. G. (eds.). Medieval Central Asia and the Persianate World: Iranian Tradition and Islamic Civilisation. I.B. Tauris. pp. 31–55.
- Marlow, Louise (2016). Counsel for Kings: Wisdom and Politics in Tenth-Century Iran. Vol. I: The Nasihat Al-muluk of Pseudo-Mawardi: Contexts and Themes. Edinburgh University Press. ISBN 9781474406505.
- Nazim, M. (1987). "Mākān b. Kākī". In Houtsma, Martijn Theodoor (ed.). E.J. Brill's first encyclopaedia of Islam, 1913–1936, Volume V: L–Moriscos. Leiden: BRILL. pp. 164–165. ISBN 90-04-08265-4.
- Negmatov, N.N. (1998). "The Samanids". In Asimov, M.S.; Bosworth, C.E. (eds.). History of Civilizations of Central Asia. Vol. IV, part one:The age of achievement: A.D. 750 to the end of the fifteenth century. UNESCO. pp. 77–94.
- Pourshariati, Parvenah (2011). Decline and Fall of the Sasanian Empire: The Sasanian-Parthian Confederacy and the Arab Conquest of Iran. I.B. Tauris.
- Shahbazi, A. Shapur (2005). "SASANIAN DYNASTY". In Yarshater, Ehsan (ed.). Encyclopædia Iranica (Online ed.). Encyclopædia Iranica Foundation.
- Subtelny, Maria (2013). "Between Persian legend and Samanid orthodoxy: accounts about Gayumarth in Bal'ami's Tarikhnama". In Hillenbrand, Robert; Peacock, A.C.S.; Abdullaeva, Firuza (eds.). Ferdowsi, the Mongols and the History of Iran: Art, Literature and Culture from Early Islam to Qajar Persia. Bloomsbury Publishing. pp. 33–46. ISBN 9781786734655.
- Treadwell, W. L. (1991). The Political History of the Sāmānid State (PhD thesis). University of Oxford.
- de la Vaissière, Étienne (2005). Sogdian Traders: A History. Brill.
