= Nuh ibn Asad =

Emir of Samarkand from 819 to 841/2

- Emir of Samarkand; Shahanshah
- Reign: 819–841/842
- Predecessor: Office established
- Successor: Yahya and Ahmad
- Died: 841/842; Samarkand
- House: Samanid
- Father: Asad
- Religion: Islam

Nuh ibn Asad (نوح بن اسد; d. 841/842) was a Samanid ruler of Samarkand (819-841/2). He was a son of Asad.

In 819, Nuh was granted authority over the city of Samarkand by Caliph Al-Ma'mun's governor of Khurasan, Ghassan ibn 'Abbad, as a reward for his support against the rebel Rafi' ibn Laith. In 839/840, Nuh captured Isfijab and constructed a wall around it to protect the city from the nomadic pagan Turks living near the borders of the Samanid state. Nuh continued to rule over the city until his death in 841 or 842. Abdallah, the governor of Khurasan, then appointed two of Nuh's brothers, Yahya and Ahmad, to jointly rule over Samarkand.

== Sources ==
- Frye, R.N. (1975). "The Sāmānids". In Frye, R.N. (ed.). The Cambridge History of Iran. Vol. 4: From the Arab Invasion to the Saljuqs. Cambridge: Cambridge University Press. pp. 136–161. ISBN 0-521-20093-8.
- Wheatley, Paul (2001). The Places Where Men Pray Together: Cities in Islamic Lands, Seventh Through the Tenth Centuries. University of Chicago Press. ISBN 9780226894287.

Preceded by: None	Samanid Ruler (in Samarkand); 819–841/2	Followed by: Yahya and Ahmad
