= 810s =

Decade

The 810s decade ran from January 1, 810, to December 31, 819.

== Events ==
=== 810 ===
==== By place ====
====== Byzantine Empire ======
- Spring – The Venetian dukes change sides again, submitting to King Pepin, under the authority of his father Charlemagne, who then proceeds to take Venice. Emperor Nikephoros I sends a Byzantine fleet to Dalmatia, prompting Pepin to withdraw to the mainland. A legate is dispatched to Venice, where he deposes the turncoat dukes, before continuing on to Aachen, to negotiate a peace with Charlemagne. Charlemagne recognises Byzantine dominance over Venice and Dalmatia in the Adriatic Sea.

====== Europe ======
- King Godfred of the Danes leads 200 Viking ships to plunder the Frisian coast, and forces the merchants to pay 100 pounds of silver. He claims Northern Frisia as Danish territory.
- Godfred is killed by one of his housecarls, and is succeeded by Hemming. According to Notker of Saint Gall, the bodyguard who murdered Godfred is possibly one of his sons.
- Al-Andalus (modern Spain): The city of Mérida rises up against the Emirate of Córdoba.

==== By topic ====
====== Religion ======
- Tikal Temple III, also known as the Temple of the Jaguar Priest, is constructed in Tikal National Park (modern Guatemala).
- The Book of Kells (also known as the Book of Colomba), an illuminated manuscript, is completed by Celtic monks (approximate date).

=== 811 ===
==== By place ====
====== Byzantine Empire ======
- Byzantine–Bulgarian War: Emperor Nikephoros I organises a new campaign against the Bulgarian Empire, gathering an expeditionary force (most of the Roman army) from all parts of the empire. He is accompanied by high-ranking officials and aristocrats, including his son Stauracius and brother-in-law Michael I Rangabe (both later emperors temporarily). Krum, ruler (khan) of Bulgaria, sends envoys to sue for peace. Nikephoros refuses to accept the terms and marches through the Balkan passes towards Pliska, the Bulgarian capital.
- July 23 – Nikephoros I reaches Pliska, and destroys a Bulgarian army of 12,000 elite soldiers who guard the stronghold. Another hastily assembled relief force of 50,000 soldiers suffers a similar fate. The Byzantines capture the defenseless capital. Nikephoros plunders the city and captures Krum's treasury. He burns the countryside, slaughters sheep and pigs, as he pursues the retreating Bulgars southwest towards Serdica (modern-day Sofia).
- July 26 – Battle of Vărbitsa Pass: Nikephoros I is trapped (probably in the Vărbitsa Pass) and defeated by the Bulgars, who use the tactics of ambush and surprise night attacks to immobilize the Byzantine forces. Nikephoros himself is killed; Krum has the emperor's head carried back in triumph on a pole, where it is cleaned out, lined with silver and made into a jeweled skull cup, which he allows his Slavic princes (archons) to drink from with him.
- Stauracius is installed as emperor at Adrianople (the first time a Byzantine emperor is crowned outside Constantinople). Because of a sword wound near his neck (during the Battle of Pliska), Stauracius is paralyzed. The imperial court is split between the noble factions of his wife Theophano and his sister Prokopia.
- October 2 – Michael I is declared emperor of the Byzantine Empire; Stauracius is forced by senior officials to retire to a monastery.

====== Europe ======
- Treaty of Heiligen: King Hemming of Denmark concludes a peace treaty with Emperor Charlemagne in present-day Rendsburg. The southern boundary of Denmark is established at the Eider River.

====== Abbasid Caliphate ======
- Fourth Fitna: Abbasid caliph al-Amin appoints Ali ibn Isa ibn Mahan as governor of Khurasan, in northeast Persia, and sends an army of 40,000 men with him against his half-brother al-Ma'mun. Ibn Mahan's army is defeated by a smaller army under Tahir ibn Husayn, at Rayy. During the fighting Ali ibn Isa ibn Mahan is killed.

=== 812 ===
==== By place ====
====== Byzantine Empire ======
- January 11 – Ex-emperor Staurakios, a son of Nikephoros I, dies of putrefaction in his wounds (see 811) in a monastery. He has reigned only two months and eight days, before being exiled by senior officials in Constantinople.
- Emperor Michael I re-opens peace negotiations with the Franks, and recognizes Charlemagne as emperor (basileus) of the Frankish Empire. In exchange for this recognition, Venice is returned to the Byzantine Empire.
- Byzantine–Bulgarian War: The Bulgars, led by Krum, ruler (khan) of the Bulgarian Empire, launch an invasion against the Byzantines. They capture the fortress cities of Develt and Mesembria, near the Black Sea.

====== Europe ======
- Charlemagne conquers Catalonia, as far south as the River Ebro and the Balearic Islands. The counties come under the rule of Bera, count of Barcelona. He signs a three-year peace treaty with the Emirate of Córdoba.
- Charlemagne issues the Capitulare de villis, concerning the rights of a feudal landholder and the services owed by his dependents. It also contains the names of some 89 plants, of which most are used medically.
- The Republic of Amalfi sends galleys to support the Byzantine general (strategos) of Sicily, Gregorio, against the Aghlabid invaders. It is one of the earliest evidences of the independence of the city.
- At the death of king Hemming of Denmark two claimants to the throne, Sigfred and Anulo, meet in battle but are both killed. Harald and Reginfrid, brothers of Anulo, becomes joint kings of Denmark.

====== Britain ======
- King Sigered of Essex is reduced to the rank of duke, by his Mercian overlords.

====== Abbasid Caliphate ======
- Fourth Fitna: Forces loyal to al-Ma'mun, led by Tahir ibn Husayn, blockade Baghdad, which is loyal to al-Ma'mun's brother, Caliph al-Amin, and begin the year-long Siege of Baghdad.

====== China ======
- The Chinese government takes over the issuing of paper bank drafts, the ancestor of paper money.

=== 813 ===
==== By place ====
====== Byzantine Empire ======
- June 22 – Battle of Versinikia: The Bulgars, led by Krum, ruler (khan) of the Bulgarian Empire, defeat Emperor Michael I near Edirne (modern Turkey). The Byzantine army (26,000 men) is destroyed by a counter-attack of Bulgarian heavy cavalry, while trapped in the valley. Krum captures the Byzantine camp and a rich prize, including gold and weaponry.
- July 11 – Michael I, under threat by conspiracies, abdicates in favor of his general Leo the Armenian, and becomes a monk (under the name Athanasius). His sons are castrated to prevent them succeeding the Byzantine throne, and relegated into monasteries. One of them, Niketas (renamed Ignatius), eventually becomes a patriarch of Constantinople.
- July 17 – Krum reaches Constantinople, and sets his camp outside the walls. He is given an invitation, and a promise of safe conduct, to meet Leo V. Krum sets out unarmed for the capital with only a small escort, but is ambushed and manages to escape. After this unsuccessful Byzantine murder attempt, the Bulgars ravage much of Eastern Thrace.
- Autumn – Siege of Adrianople: Krum captures Adrianople—one of the most important Byzantine fortresses in Thrace—after being attacked with siege engines. The garrison is forced to surrender, due to starvation. On the orders of Krum, the population of the surrounding area (numbering about 10,000) is transferred to Bulgarian territory, north of the Danube.
- Ashot I ("the Great") becomes the first Georgian Bagratid prince of Iberia, under Byzantine protection.

====== Europe ======
- September 11 — Louis the Pious, king of Aquitaine (and only surviving legitimate son), is crowned co-emperor of the Franks, with his father Charlemagne.
- Danish Viking raiders, led by King Horik I, attack Vestfold (modern Norway), due to its insubordination (approximate date).

====== Abbasid Caliphate ======
- Autumn – Siege of Baghdad: Caliph al-Amin surrenders Baghdad, after al-Ma'mun's General Tahir accepts his peace terms, but he is captured and executed. His brother al-Ma'mun becomes undisputed ruler of the Abbasid Caliphate.

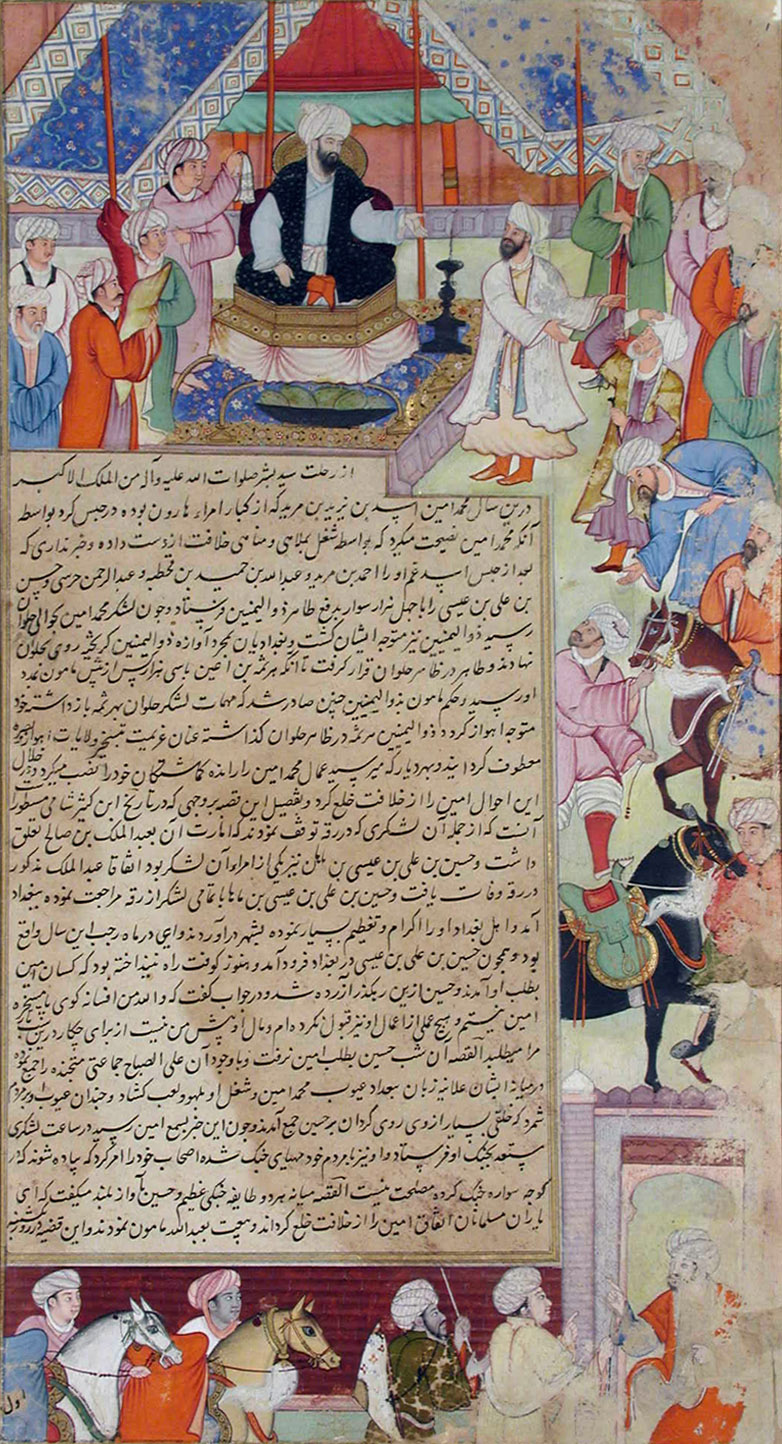
The populace pays Allegiance to the new Abbasid caliph, al-Ma'mun in 813. (Tarikh-i Alfi 1593 CE)

- The Baghdad School of Astronomy is opened by al-Ma'mun.
- Caliph al Ma’mun founds a school in Baghdad called the House of Wisdom. In this school scholars translated Greek philosophy classics into Arabic.

==== By topic ====
====== Religion ======
- Third Council of Tours: Priests are ordered to preach in the vernacular (either Vulgar Latin or German).

=== 814 ===
==== By place ====
====== Byzantine Empire ======
- April 13 – Byzantine–Bulgarian Wars: Over the winter Krum, ruler (khan) of the Bulgarian Empire, had assembled a huge army (including Slavs and Avars), for a campaign against the Byzantine Empire. But before he sets out for a major attack on Constantinople, he dies of a stroke. Krum is succeeded by his son Omurtag.

====== Europe ======
- January 28 – Charlemagne dies of pleurisy in Aachen, after an almost 14-year reign (since 800) as the first Roman Emperor of Frankish origin (the precursor of the Holy Roman Emperor). He is embalmed and buried in Aachen Cathedral. Charlemagne is succeeded by his son Louis the Pious, as king of the Frankish Empire.
- Louis I establishes himself at the imperial court of Aachen. He appoints Benedict of Aniane as his chief advisor on religious matters, and makes him abbot of Kornelimünster Abbey, which is founded by him.

====== Japan ======
- Shinsen Shōjiroku, a record of the genealogy of the ancient Japanese noble families, is completed during the reign of Emperor Saga.

==== By topic ====
====== Religion ======
- Byzantine Iconoclasm: Conflict erupts between Emperor Leo V and Patriarch Nikephoros, on the subject of iconoclasm. The latter is excommunicated.

=== 815 ===
==== By place ====
====== Byzantine Empire ======
- Byzantine–Bulgarian Treaty: Emperor Leo V the Armenian signs a 30-year peace agreement in Constantinople with Omurtag, ruler (khan) of the Bulgarian Empire. The Rhodope Mountains become the Byzantine border again, and Leo regains its lost Black Sea cities, after the Bulgars have them demolished.

====== Central America ======
- April 2 – Sihyaj K'in Ich’aak II becomes the new ruler of the Mayan city state of Machaquila in Guatemala after the death of Ochk'in Kaloomte' Aj Ho' Baak, and reigns until early 824.

====== Europe ======
- Hrafna-Flóki Vilgerðarson sets out from the Faroe Islands and discovers Iceland (documented later in the Landnámabók) (approximate date).

====== Britain ======
- King Egbert of Wessex ravages the territories of the remaining British kingdom Dumnonia, known as the West Welsh (Cornwall).

====== Asia ======
- Emperor Saga of Japan is the first sovereign to drink tea (according to legend), imported from China by monks. The upper classes adopt this beverage for medicinal use.
- July 13 – Wu Yuanheng, Chinese chancellor of the Tang Dynasty, is murdered by assassins of warlord Wu Yuanji, in Chang'an.

==== By topic ====
====== Religion ======
- Synod of Constantinople: A council led by patriarch Theodotus I, in the Hagia Sophia, reinstitutes iconoclasm.

=== 816 ===
==== By place ====
====== Europe ======
- October 5 – King Louis the Pious (son of Charlemagne) is crowned emperor of the Holy Roman Empire, by Pope Stephen IV at Reims. He also crowns the emperor's wife Ermengarde as Holy Roman Empress. The ceremony in Reims re-establishes the principle of papal supremacy, by recognising the importance of the pope in imperial coronations. Louis gives the pope many gifts, including the estate tax Vendeuvre, near Troyes (Northern France).
- Vikings raid Ireland at the Kingdom of Munster, at Inish Cathaigh.
- Battle of Pancorbo: A Moorish army from the Emirate of Córdoba is sent by Emir Al-Hakam I, to take control of the pass at Pancorbo. They defeat the army of Asturian-Basque Frankish vassals.
- Winter – The Basques, supported by the Moors, cross the Garonne River and revolt against the Franks in Gascony (north of the Pyrenees).

====== Britain ======
- King Hywel of Gwynedd is attacked by his brother Cynan on Anglesey (modern Wales), who is killed during the fighting (approximate date).

====== Abbasid Caliphate ======
- Babak Khorramdin, Persian military leader, revolts against the Abbasid Caliphate in Azerbaijan (approximate date).

==== By topic ====
====== Religion ======
- Synod of Aachen: Louis the Pious calls for a council about the regulations (Institutio canonicorum Aquisgranensis) for monastic life in the Frankish Empire.
- Synod of Chelsea: King Coenwulf of Mercia calls for a council about his right to appoint abbots and monasteries in England.
- June 12 – Pope Leo III dies after a 20-year reign, and is succeeded by Pope Stephen IV as the 97th pope of Rome.

=== 817 ===
==== By place ====
====== Europe ======
- Summer – Emperor Louis I issues an Ordinatio Imperii, an imperial decree that lays out plans for an orderly succession. He divides the Frankish Empire among his three sons: Lothair, the eldest, is proclaimed co-emperor in Aachen, and becomes the overlord of his brothers. He receives the dominion of Burgundy (including German and Gallic parts). Pepin, the second son, is proclaimed king of Aquitaine, and receives Gascony (including the marche around Toulouse and parts of Septimania); Louis (the youngest son) is proclaimed king of Bavaria, and receives the dominions of East Francia.
- Prince Grimoald IV is assassinated by a complot of Lombard nobles vying for his throne. He is succeeded by Sico as ruler of Benevento (Southern Italy), who is forced to pay an annual tribute of 7,000 solidi to Louis I.

====== North Africa ======
- Ziyadat Allah I becomes the third Aghlabid emir of Ifriqiya (modern Tunisia). During his rule, the relationship between the Aghlabid Dynasty and the Arab troops remains strained.

==== By topic ====
====== Religion ======
- January 24 – Pope Stephen IV dies at Rome after a 7-month reign, and is succeeded by Paschal I as the 98th pope of the Catholic Church.
- Synod of Aachen: The council adopts a capitulare monasticum, containing the Benedictine rules of monastic life in the Frankish realm.

=== 818 ===
==== By place ====
====== Byzantine Empire ======
- Vikings known as Rus' (Norsemen) plunder the north coast of Anatolia (modern Turkey), marking the first recorded raid of Rus' people on territory in the Byzantine Empire.

====== Europe ======
- April 17 – King Bernard of Italy, illegitimate son of Pepin of Italy, is tried and condemned to death by Emperor Louis I. The Kingdom of Italy is reabsorbed into the Frankish Empire.
- The Slavs known as Timočani on the Timok River break their alliance with the Bulgars. Duke Ljudevit of the Slavs in Lower Pannonia sends emissaries to Louis I, to assert his independence from the Franks.
- Al-Andalus: A grave rebellion breaks out in the suburbs of Cordoba, against the Emirate of Córdoba. Andalucian Arab refugees arrive in Fez (modern Morocco).

====== Britain ======
- The Anglo-Saxons, led by King Coenwulf of Mercia, raid Dyfed in Wales (approximate date).

====== Asia ======
- Beginning of the Lemro period: The Sambawa and Pyinsa Kingdoms are founded in present-day Myanmar.

==== By topic ====
====== Religion ======
- Theodulf, bishop of Orléans, is deposed and imprisoned, after becoming involved in a conspiracy with Bernard of Italy.

=== 819 ===
==== By place ====
====== Europe ======
- Spring – Emperor Louis I marries Judith of Bavaria in Aachen. She becomes his second wife and Empress of the Franks. Like many of the royal marriages of the time, Judith is selected through a bridal show.
- Ljudevit, duke of the Slavs in Lower Pannonia, raises a rebellion against the Frankish Empire. Louis I sends an army led by Cadolah of Friuli, but is defeated by the Pannonian Slavs.
- Battle of Kupa: Ljudevit defeats the Frankish forces led by Borna, a vassal of Louis I. He escapes with the help of his elite bodyguard. Ljudevit uses the momentum and invades the Duchy of Croatia.
- Nominoe, a noble Briton, is appointed by Louis I as count of Vannes in Brittany (approximate date).

====== Abbasid Caliphate ======
- August 11 – Caliph Al-Ma'mun returns to Baghdad, securing the city's place as the capital of the Abbasid Caliphate.
- Abbasid caliph Al-Ma'mun dismisses Al-Hasan ibn Sahl as governor of al-Iraq.
- Ghassan ibn Abbad, the Abbasid governor of Khorasan rewards the Samanid brothers, Nuh, Ahmad, Yahya and ilyas for their aid against the rebel Rafi ibn al-Layth, rewarding them each important cities and territories, respectively Samarkand, Farghana, Tashkent and Herat, to govern under Abbasid suzerainty. This becomes the basis for the formation of the Samanid dynasty which will rule Khorasan for a century.

== Significant people ==
- Al-Amin the Arab caliph
- Al-Ma'mun of Arab Caliphate
- Al-Shafi'i
- Charlemagne
- Michael I Rangabe of Byzantium
- Louis the Pious
- Leo V of Byzantium
- Sulayman ibn Abi Ja'far

== Births ==
810

- July 19 – Muhammad al-Bukhari, Persian Islamic scholar (d. 870)
- July 27 – Xuān Zong, emperor of the Tang Dynasty (d. 859)
- Abbas ibn Firnas, Muslim physician and inventor (d. 887)
- Anastasius, antipope of Rome (approximate date)
- Bertharius, Benedictine abbot and poet (approximate date)
- Engelram, Frankish chamberlain (approximate date)
- Gérard II, Frankish nobleman (approximate date)
- Halfdan the Black, Norwegian nobleman (approximate date)
- Kassia, Byzantine abbess and hymnographer (approximate date)
- Kenneth MacAlpin, king of Scotland (d. 858)
- Louis the German, king of East Francia (approximate date)
- Minamoto no Makoto, Japanese prince (d. 868)
- Photius I, patriarch of Constantinople (approximate date)
- Seishi, empress of Japan (d. 879)

811

- Abu Hatim al-Razi, Muslim hadith scholar (d. 890)
- Basil I, emperor of the Byzantine Empire (d. 886)
- Muhammad al-Jawad, ninth Twelver Shī'ah Imām (d. 835)
- Ōe no Otondo, Japanese scholar (d. 877)

812

- Domnall mac Ailpín, king of Scotland (d. 862)
- Li Rong, prince of the Tang Dynasty (or 813)
- Sugawara no Koreyoshi, Japanese nobleman (d. 880)
- Theodora of Thessaloniki, Byzantine nun and saint (d. 892)
- Wang Yuankui, general of the Tang Dynasty (d. 854)
- Wen Tingyun, Chinese poet and lyricist (d. 870)

813

- Fujiwara no Yoshimi, Japanese nobleman (d. 867)
- Fujiwara no Yoshisuke, Japanese statesman (d. 867)
- Li Rong, prince of the Tang Dynasty (or 812)
- Li Shangyin, Chinese official and poet (d. 858)
- Moses Bar-Kepha, Syriac bishop (approximate date)
- Muhammad at-Taqi, Muslim ninth Ismā'īlī imam (or 814)
- Theophilus, emperor of the Byzantine Empire (d. 842)
- Wandelbert, Benedictine monk (approximate date)

814

- Bodo, Frankish deacon (approximate date)
- Enchin, Japanese Buddhist monk (d. 891)
- Han Yunzhong, general of the Tang dynasty (d. 874)
- Wu Zong, emperor of the Tang dynasty (d. 846)
- Zhou Bao, general of the Tang dynasty (d. 888)

815

- Abu Hanifa Dinawari, Muslim botanist and geographer (d. 896)
- Boniface VI, pope of the Catholic Church (d. 896)
- Dawud al-Zahiri, Muslim scholar (approximate date)
- Eberhard, duke of Friuli (approximate date)
- Johannes Scotus Eriugena, Irish theologian (approximate date)
- Leoluca, Sicilian abbot (approximate date)
- Methodius, Byzantine missionary and bishop (d. 885)
- Theodora, Byzantine empress (approximate date)

816

- Formosus, pope of the Catholic Church (approximate date)
- Henjō, Japanese waka poet (d. 890)

817

- Abu Dawud, Muslim hadith compiler (or 818)
- Al-Fath ibn Khaqan, Muslim governor (or 818)
- Pepin, count of Vermandois (approximate date)
- Pyinbya, king of Burma (d. 876)

818

- Abu Dawud, Muslim hadith compiler (or 817)
- Al-Fath ibn Khaqan, Muslim governor (or 817)
- Ariwara no Yukihira, Japanese governor (d. 893)
- Pepin, count of Vermandois (approximate date)
- Sahl al-Tustari, Persian scholar (approximate date)

819

- Martianus Hiberniensis, Irish monk and calligrapher (d. 875)

== Deaths ==
810

- July 8 – Pippin of Italy, son of Charlemagne
- Æthelburh, Anglo-Saxon abbess
- Abul-Abbas, Asian elephant given to Charlemagne
- Bello of Carcassonne, Frankish nobleman
- Eardwulf, king of Northumbria (approximate date)
- Eochaid mac Fiachnai, king of Ulaid (Ireland)
- Fujiwara no Nakanari, Japanese nobleman (b. 764)
- Gisela, Frankish abbess (b. 757)
- Godfred, king of the Danes
- Ismail ibn Ibrahim, Muslim scholar (b. 756)
- Liu Ji, general of the Tang Dynasty (b. 757)
- Owain ap Maredudd, king of Dyfed (Wales)
- Rotrude, Frankish princess, daughter of Charlemagne
- Thrasco, Obotrite prince
- Vojnomir, duke of Lower Pannonia (approximate date)
- Wu Shaocheng, general of the Tang Dynasty (b. 750)

811

- June 17 – Sakanoue no Tamuramaro, Japanese shōgun (b. 758)
- July 24 – Gao Ying, chancellor of the Tang Dynasty (b. 740)
- July 26 – Nikephoros I, emperor of the Byzantine Empire
- Ali ibn Isa ibn Mahan, Muslim military leader
- Charles the Younger, son of Charlemagne
- Li Fan, chancellor of the Tang Dynasty (b. 754)
- Pei Ji, chancellor of the Tang Dynasty
- Pepin the Hunchback, son of Charlemagne

812

- January 11 – Staurakios, Byzantine emperor
- Abd al-Malik ibn Salih, Abbasid general (b. 750)
- Candidus of Fulda, Benedictine scholar
- Du You, chancellor of the Tang Dynasty (b. 735)
- Flann mac Congalaig, king of Brega (Ireland)
- Fujiwara no Uchimaro, Japanese nobleman (b. 756)
- Hemming, king of Denmark
- Ibrahim I, Muslim emir of the Aghlabids (b. 756)
- Jeong, king of Balhae (Korea) (approximate date)
- Li Ning, prince of the Tang Dynasty (b. 793)
- Nikephoros, son of Constantine V (approximate date)
- Tian Ji'an, general of the Tang Dynasty
- William of Gellone, Frankish nobleman (or 814)

813

- ’Abd Allah ibn Wahb, Muslim jurist (b. 743)
- Eanberht, bishop of Hexham (approximate date)
- Muhammad ibn Harun al-Amin, Muslim caliph (b. 787)

814

- January 28 – Charlemagne, king and emperor of the Franks (b. 742)
- February 18 – Angilbert, Frankish diplomat and abbot
- April 4 – Plato of Sakkoudion, Byzantine abbot
- April 13 – Krum, ruler (khan) of the Bulgarian Empire
- Abd-Allah ibn Numayr, Muslim narrator of hadith
- Abu Nuwas, Muslim poet (b. 756)
- Ailbhe of Ceann Mhara, Irish monk
- Baizhang Huaihai, Chinese Zen Buddhist monk (b. 720)
- Gruffydd ap Cyngen, Welsh prince (approximate date)
- Li Jifu, chancellor of the Tang dynasty (b. 758)
- Meng Jiao, Chinese poet (b. 751)
- Odo of Metz, Frankish architect (b. 742)
- Reginfrid, King of Denmark
- Sugano no Mamichi, Japanese nobleman (b. 741)
- Triffyn ap Rhain, king of Dyfed (approximate date)
- Waldo of Reichenau, Frankish abbot and bishop
- William of Gellone, Frankish nobleman (or 812)
- Wu Shaoyang, general of the Tang dynasty

815

- February 15 – Ibn Tabataba, Zaydi anti-caliph
- July 13 – Wu Yuanheng, chancellor of the Tang Dynasty (b. 758)
- October 18 – Abu'l-Saraya, Zaydi rebel leader
- Jābir ibn Hayyān (Geber), Muslim alchemist (approximate date)
- Laylā bint Ṭarīf, Arab woman warrior poet
- Mashallah ibn Athari, Jewish-Arab astrologer
- Muirgius mac Tommaltaig, king of Connacht (Ireland)
- Omar Tiberiades, Persian astrologer (approximate date)
- Sadnalegs, emperor of Tibet (approximate date)

816

- June 12 – Leo III, pope of the Catholic Church (b. 750)
- October 28 – Beggo, count of Toulouse and Paris
- Cynan Dindaethwy, king of Gwynedd (Wales)
- Fātimah bint Mūsā, Muslim saint (b. 790)
- Harthama ibn A'yan, Muslim governor
- Hildoard, archbishop of Cambrai
- Li He, Chinese poet (b. 790)
- Empress Dowager Wang (Xianzong), Chinese empress
- Wulfar, archbishop of Reims

817

- January 24 – Stephen IV, pope of the Catholic Church
- Grimoald IV, Lombard prince of Benevento
- Quriaqos of Tagrit, patriarch of Antioch
- Tibraide mac Cethernach, abbot of Clonfert
- Theophanes the Confessor, Byzantine monk (or 818)
- Wu Yuanji, general of the Tang Dynasty

818

- April 17 – Bernard of Italy, king of the Lombards (b. 797)
- October 3 – Ermengarde, queen of the Franks
- Al-Fadl ibn Sahl, Persian vizier
- Ali al-Ridha, 8th Shia Imam (b. 766)
- Cernach mac Congalaig, king of Brega (Ireland)
- Clement, Irish scholar and saint
- Felix, bishop of Urgell (Spain)
- García I Jiménez, duke of Gascony
- Hildebold, archbishop of Cologne
- Michael the Confessor, bishop of Synnada
- Morman, chieftain and king of Brittany
- Muiredach mac Brain, king of Leinster (Ireland)
- Theophanes the Confessor, Byzantine monk (or 817)
- Quan Deyu, chancellor of the Tang dynasty (b. 759)
- Yuan Zi, general of the Tang dynasty (b. 739)

819

- March 8 – Li Shidao, Chinese warlord
- Áed Oirdnide, king of Ailech (Ireland)
- Cadolah, duke of Friuli (Italy)
- Cairell mac Fiachnai, king of Ulaid (Ireland)
- Cheng Yi, chancellor of the Tang Dynasty
- Hisham ibn al-Kalbi, Arab historian (b. 737)
- Liu Zongyuan, Chinese poet and official (b. 773)
