= 814 =

814 in various calendars
- Gregorian calendar: 814; DCCCXIV
- Ab urbe condita: 1567
- Armenian calendar: 263; ԹՎ ՄԿԳ
- Assyrian calendar: 5564
- Balinese saka calendar: 735–736
- Bengali calendar: 220–221
- Berber calendar: 1764
- Buddhist calendar: 1358
- Burmese calendar: 176
- Byzantine calendar: 6322–6323
- Chinese calendar: 癸巳年 (Water Snake); 3511 or 3304 — to — 甲午年 (Wood Horse); 3512 or 3305
- Coptic calendar: 530–531
- Discordian calendar: 1980
- Ethiopian calendar: 806–807
- Hebrew calendar: 4574–4575
- Hindu calendars
- Vikram Samvat: 870–871
- Shaka Samvat: 735–736
- Kali Yuga: 3914–3915
- Holocene calendar: 10814
- Iranian calendar: 192–193
- Islamic calendar: 198–199
- Japanese calendar: Kōnin 5 (弘仁５年)
- Javanese calendar: 710–711
- Julian calendar: 814; DCCCXIV
- Korean calendar: 3147
- Minguo calendar: 1098 before ROC 民前1098年
- Nanakshahi calendar: −654
- Seleucid era: 1125/1126 AG
- Thai solar calendar: 1356–1357
- Tibetan calendar: ཆུ་མོ་སྦྲུལ་ལོ་ (female Water-Snake); 940 or 559 or −213 — to — ཤིང་ཕོ་རྟ་ལོ་ (male Wood-Horse); 941 or 560 or −212

Europe at the death of Charlemagne (814)

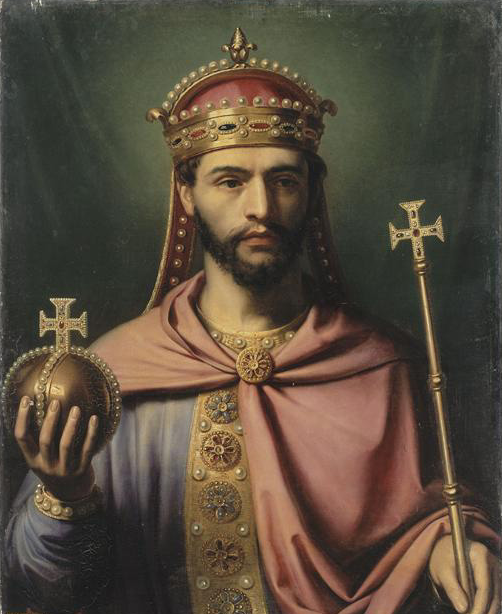
Emperor Louis I the Pious (778–840)

Year 814 (DCCCXIV) was a common year starting on Sunday of the Julian calendar, the 814th year of the Common Era (CE) and Anno Domini (AD) designations, the 814th year of the 1st millennium, the 14th year of the 9th century, and the 5th year of the 810s decade.

== Events ==
=== By place ===
==== Byzantine Empire ====
- April 13 – Byzantine–Bulgarian Wars: Over the winter Krum, ruler (khan) of the Bulgarian Empire, had assembled a huge army (including Slavs and Avars), for a campaign against the Byzantine Empire. But before he sets out for a major attack on Constantinople, he dies of a stroke. Krum is succeeded by his son Omurtag.

==== Europe ====
- January 28 – Charlemagne dies of pleurisy in Aachen, after an almost 14-year reign (since 800) as the first Roman Emperor of Frankish origin (the precursor of the Holy Roman Emperor). He is embalmed and buried in Aachen Cathedral. Charlemagne is succeeded by his son Louis the Pious, as king of the Frankish Empire.
- Louis I establishes himself at the imperial court of Aachen. He appoints Benedict of Aniane as his chief advisor on religious matters, and makes him abbot of Kornelimünster Abbey, which is founded by him.

==== Japan ====
- Shinsen Shōjiroku, a record of the genealogy of the ancient Japanese noble families, is completed during the reign of Emperor Saga.

=== By topic ===
==== Religion ====
- Byzantine Iconoclasm: Conflict erupts between Emperor Leo V and Patriarch Nikephoros, on the subject of iconoclasm. The latter is excommunicated.

== Births ==
- Bodo, Frankish deacon (approximate date)
- Enchin, Japanese Buddhist monk (d. 891)
- Han Yunzhong, general of the Tang dynasty (d. 874)
- Wu Zong, emperor of the Tang dynasty (d. 846)
- Zhou Bao, general of the Tang dynasty (d. 888)

== Deaths ==
- January 28 – Charlemagne, king and emperor of the Franks (b. 742)
- February 18 – Angilbert, Frankish diplomat and abbot
- April 4 – Plato of Sakkoudion, Byzantine abbot
- April 13 – Krum, ruler (khan) of the Bulgarian Empire
- Abd-Allah ibn Numayr, Muslim narrator of hadith
- Abu Nuwas, Muslim poet (b. 756)
- Ailbhe of Ceann Mhara, Irish monk
- Baizhang Huaihai, Chinese Zen Buddhist monk (b. 720)
- Gruffydd ap Cyngen, Welsh prince (approximate date)
- Li Jifu, chancellor of the Tang dynasty (b. 758)
- Meng Jiao, Chinese poet (b. 751)
- Odo of Metz, Frankish architect (b. 742)
- Reginfrid, King of Denmark
- Sugano no Mamichi, Japanese nobleman (b. 741)
- Triffyn ap Rhain, king of Dyfed (approximate date)
- Waldo of Reichenau, Frankish abbot and bishop
- William of Gellone, Frankish nobleman (or 812)
- Wu Shaoyang, general of the Tang dynasty
