= 813 =

Calendar year

813 in various calendars
Gregorian calendar	813; DCCCXIII
Ab urbe condita	1566
Armenian calendar	262; ԹՎ ՄԿԲ
Assyrian calendar	5563
Balinese saka calendar	734–735
Bengali calendar	219–220
Berber calendar	1763
Buddhist calendar	1357
Burmese calendar	175
Byzantine calendar	6321–6322
Chinese calendar	壬辰年 (Water Dragon); 3510 or 3303 — to — 癸巳年 (Water Snake); 3511 or 3304
Coptic calendar	529–530
Discordian calendar	1979
Ethiopian calendar	805–806
Hebrew calendar	4573–4574
- Hindu calendars
Vikram Samvat	869–870
Shaka Samvat	734–735
Kali Yuga	3913–3914
Holocene calendar	10813
Iranian calendar	191–192
Islamic calendar	197–198
Japanese calendar	Kōnin 4 (弘仁４年)
Javanese calendar	709–710
Julian calendar	813; DCCCXIII
Korean calendar	3146
Minguo calendar	1099 before ROC 民前1099年
Nanakshahi calendar	−655
Seleucid era	1124/1125 AG
Thai solar calendar	1355–1356
Tibetan calendar	ཆུ་ཕོ་འབྲུག་ལོ་ (male Water-Dragon); 939 or 558 or −214 — to — ཆུ་མོ་སྦྲུལ་ལོ་ (female Water-Snake); 940 or 559 or −213

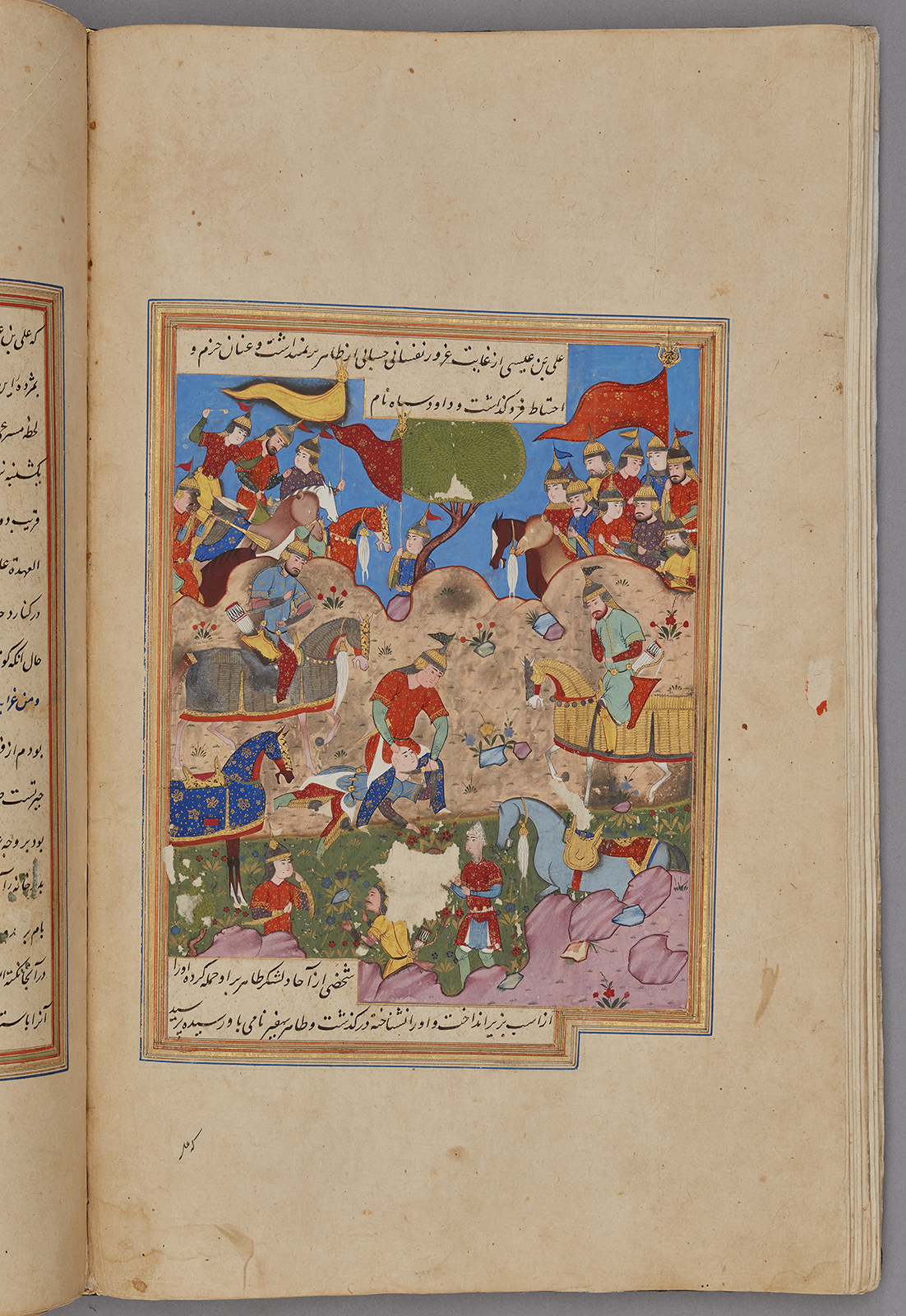
The victory of al-Ma'mun over al-Amin (death of al-Amin in 813).

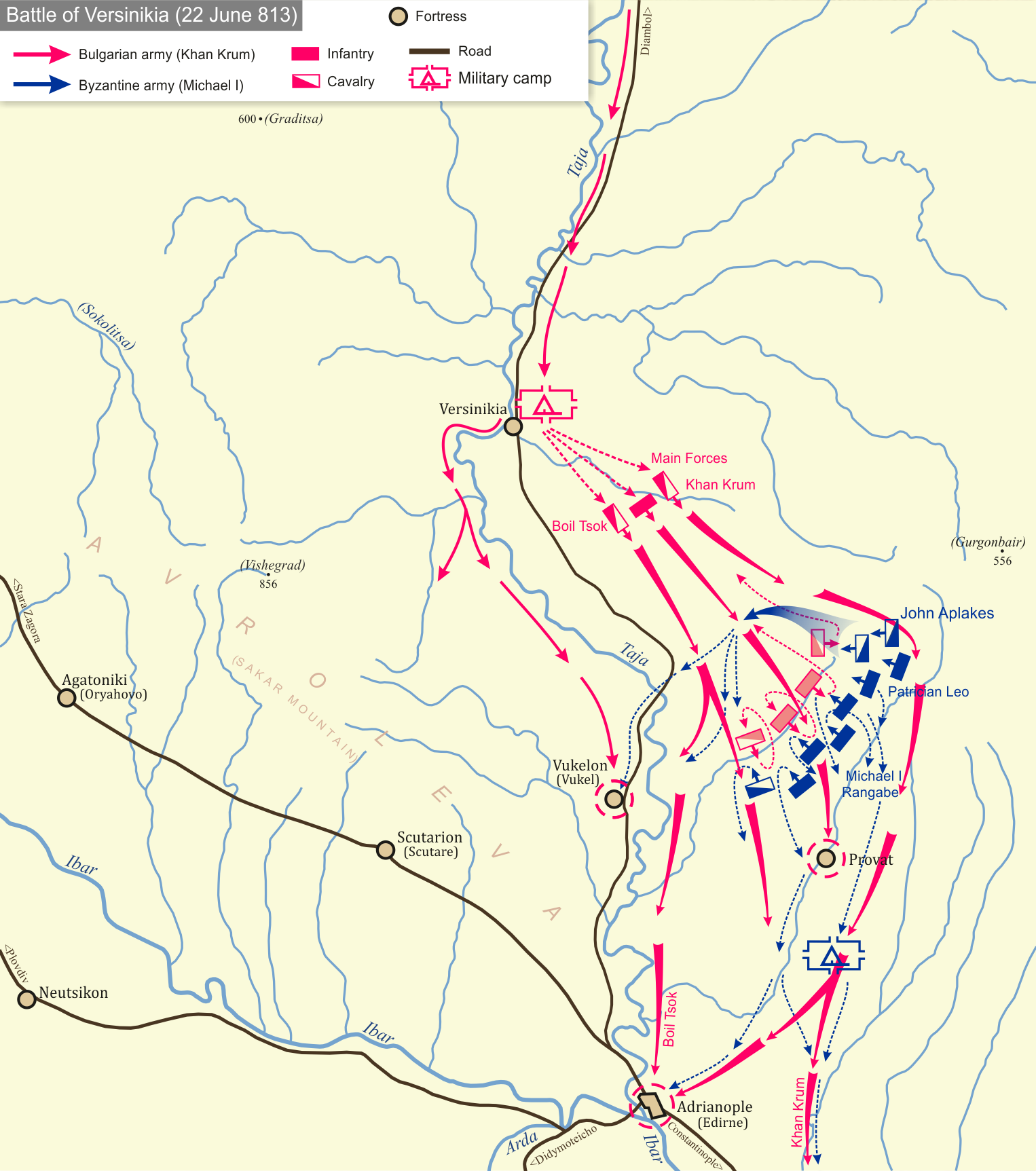
Battle of Versinikia near Edirne (Turkey)

813 (DCCCXIII) was a common year starting on Saturday of the Julian calendar, the 813th year of the Common Era (CE) and Anno Domini (AD) designations, the 813th year of the 1st millennium, the 13th year of the 9th century, and the 4th year of the 810s decade. As of the start of 813, the Gregorian calendar was 4 days ahead of the Julian calendar, which was the dominant calendar of the time.

== Events ==
=== By place ===
==== Byzantine Empire ====
- June 22 – Battle of Versinikia: The Bulgars, led by Krum, ruler (khan) of the Bulgarian Empire, defeat Emperor Michael I near Edirne (modern Turkey). The Byzantine army (26,000 men) is destroyed by a counter-attack of Bulgarian heavy cavalry, while trapped in the valley. Krum captures the Byzantine camp and a rich prize, including gold and weaponry.
- July 11 – Michael I, under threat by conspiracies, abdicates in favor of his general Leo the Armenian, and becomes a monk (under the name Athanasius). His sons are castrated to prevent them succeeding the Byzantine throne, and relegated into monasteries. One of them, Niketas (renamed Ignatius), eventually becomes a patriarch of Constantinople.
- July 17 – Krum reaches Constantinople, and sets his camp outside the walls. He is given an invitation, and a promise of safe conduct, to meet Leo V. Krum sets out unarmed for the capital with only a small escort, but is ambushed and manages to escape. After this unsuccessful Byzantine murder attempt, the Bulgars ravage much of Eastern Thrace.
- Autumn – Siege of Adrianople: Krum captures Adrianople—one of the most important Byzantine fortresses in Thrace—after being attacked with siege engines. The garrison is forced to surrender, due to starvation. On the orders of Krum, the population of the surrounding area (numbering about 10,000) is transferred to Bulgarian territory, north of the Danube.
- Ashot I ("the Great") becomes the first Georgian Bagratid prince of Iberia, under Byzantine protection.

==== Europe ====
- September 11 — Louis the Pious, king of Aquitaine (and only surviving legitimate son), is crowned co-emperor of the Franks, with his father Charlemagne.
- Danish Viking raiders, led by King Horik I, attack Vestfold (modern Norway), due to its insubordination (approximate date).
- Third Council of Tours: Priests are ordered to preach in the vernacular language (either Vulgar Latin or German).

==== Abbasid Caliphate ====
- Autumn – Siege of Baghdad: Caliph al-Amin surrenders Baghdad, after al-Ma'mun's General Tahir accepts his peace terms, but he is captured and executed. His brother al-Ma'mun becomes undisputed ruler of the Abbasid Caliphate.

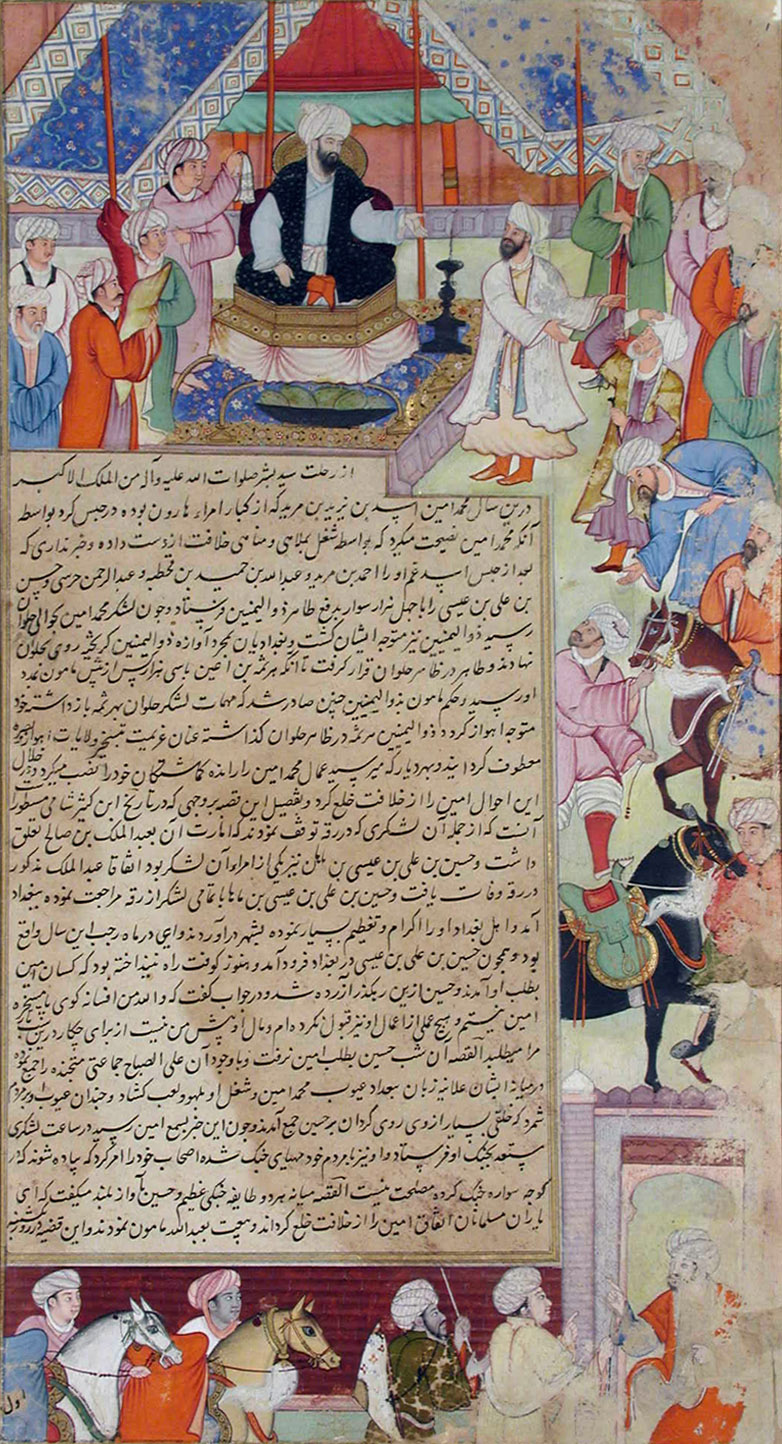
The populace pays Allegiance to the new Abbasid caliph, al-Ma'mun in 813. (Tarikh-i Alfi 1593 CE)

- The Baghdad School of Astronomy is opened by al-Ma'mun.
- Caliph al Ma’mun founds a school in Baghdad called the House of Wisdom. In this school scholars translated Greek philosophy classics into Arabic.

== Births ==
- Fujiwara no Yoshimi, Japanese nobleman (d. 867)
- Fujiwara no Yoshisuke, Japanese statesman (d. 867)
- Li Rong, prince of the Tang Dynasty (or 812)
- Li Shangyin, Chinese official and poet (d. 858)
- Moses Bar-Kepha, Syriac bishop (approximate date)
- Muhammad at-Taqi, Muslim ninth Ismā'īlī imam (or 814)
- Theophilus, emperor of the Byzantine Empire (d. 842)
- Wandelbert, Benedictine monk (approximate date)

== Deaths ==
- ’Abd Allah ibn Wahb, Muslim jurist (b. 743)
- Eanberht, bishop of Hexham (approximate date)
- Muhammad ibn Harun al-Amin, Muslim caliph (b. 787)
