= 812 =

Calendar year

812 in various calendars
- Gregorian calendar: 812; DCCCXII
- Ab urbe condita: 1565
- Armenian calendar: 261; ԹՎ ՄԿԱ
- Assyrian calendar: 5562
- Balinese saka calendar: 733–734
- Bengali calendar: 218–219
- Berber calendar: 1762
- Buddhist calendar: 1356
- Burmese calendar: 174
- Byzantine calendar: 6320–6321
- Chinese calendar: 辛卯年 (Metal Rabbit); 3509 or 3302 — to — 壬辰年 (Water Dragon); 3510 or 3303
- Coptic calendar: 528–529
- Discordian calendar: 1978
- Ethiopian calendar: 804–805
- Hebrew calendar: 4572–4573
- Hindu calendars
- Vikram Samvat: 868–869
- Shaka Samvat: 733–734
- Kali Yuga: 3912–3913
- Holocene calendar: 10812
- Iranian calendar: 190–191
- Islamic calendar: 196–197
- Japanese calendar: Kōnin 3 (弘仁３年)
- Javanese calendar: 708–709
- Julian calendar: 812; DCCCXII
- Korean calendar: 3145
- Minguo calendar: 1100 before ROC 民前1100年
- Nanakshahi calendar: −656
- Seleucid era: 1123/1124 AG
- Thai solar calendar: 1354–1355
- Tibetan calendar: ལྕགས་མོ་ཡོས་ལོ་ (female Iron-Hare); 938 or 557 or −215 — to — ཆུ་ཕོ་འབྲུག་ལོ་ (male Water-Dragon); 939 or 558 or −214

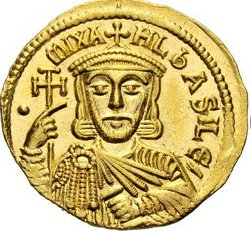
Emperor Michael I (c. 770–844)

Year 812 (DCCCXII) was a leap year starting on Thursday of the Julian calendar, the 812th year of the Common Era (CE) and Anno Domini (AD) designations, the 812th year of the 1st millennium, the 12th year of the 9th century, and the 3rd year of the 810s decade.

== Events ==
=== By place ===
==== Byzantine Empire ====
- January 11 – Ex-emperor Staurakios, a son of Nikephoros I, dies of putrefaction in his wounds (see 811) in a monastery. He has reigned only two months and eight days, before being exiled by senior officials in Constantinople.
- Emperor Michael I re-opens peace negotiations with the Franks, and recognizes Charlemagne as emperor (basileus) of the Frankish Empire. In exchange for this recognition, Venice is returned to the Byzantine Empire.
- Byzantine–Bulgarian War: The Bulgars, led by Krum, ruler (khan) of the Bulgarian Empire, launch an invasion against the Byzantines. They capture the fortress cities of Develt and Mesembria, near the Black Sea.

==== Europe ====
- Charlemagne conquers Catalonia, as far south as the River Ebro and the Balearic Islands. The counties come under the rule of Bera, count of Barcelona. He signs a three-year peace treaty with the Emirate of Córdoba.
- Charlemagne issues the Capitulare de villis, concerning the rights of a feudal landholder and the services owed by his dependents. It also contains the names of some 89 plants, of which most are used medically.
- The Republic of Amalfi sends galleys to support the Byzantine general (strategos) of Sicily, Gregorio, against the Aghlabid invaders. It is one of the earliest evidences of the independence of the city.
- At the death of king Hemming of Denmark two claimants to the throne, Sigfred and Anulo, meet in battle but are both killed. Harald and Reginfrid, brothers of Anulo, becomes joint kings of Denmark.
- Deganwy, Wales is burned by lightning.

==== England ====
- King Sigered of Essex is reduced to the rank of duke, by his Mercian overlords.

==== Abbasid Caliphate ====
- Fourth Fitna: Forces loyal to al-Ma'mun, led by Tahir ibn Husayn, blockade Baghdad, which is loyal to al-Ma'mun's brother, Caliph al-Amin, and begin the year-long Siege of Baghdad.

==== Asia ====
- The Chinese government takes over the issuing of paper bank drafts, the ancestor of paper money.
- Earliest record of cherry blossom at the Imperial Court in Kyoto.

== Births ==
- Domnall mac Ailpín, king of Scotland (d. 862)
- Li Rong, prince of the Tang Dynasty (or 813)
- Sugawara no Koreyoshi, Japanese nobleman (d. 880)
- Theodora of Thessaloniki, Byzantine nun and saint (d. 892)
- Wang Yuankui, general of the Tang Dynasty (d. 854)
- Wen Tingyun, Chinese poet and lyricist (d. 870)

== Deaths ==
- January 11 – Staurakios, Byzantine emperor
- Abd al-Malik ibn Salih, Abbasid general (b. 750)
- Candidus of Fulda, Benedictine scholar
- Du You, chancellor of the Tang Dynasty (b. 735)
- Flann mac Congalaig, king of Brega (Ireland)
- Fujiwara no Uchimaro, Japanese nobleman (b. 756)
- Hemming, king of Denmark
- Ibrahim I, Muslim emir of the Aghlabids (b. 756)
- Jeong, king of Balhae (Korea) (approximate date)
- Li Ning, prince of the Tang Dynasty (b. 793)
- Nikephoros, son of Constantine V (approximate date)
- Tian Ji'an, general of the Tang Dynasty
- William of Gellone, Frankish nobleman (or 814)
