= Samanid Epigraphic Ware =

Ceramic ware

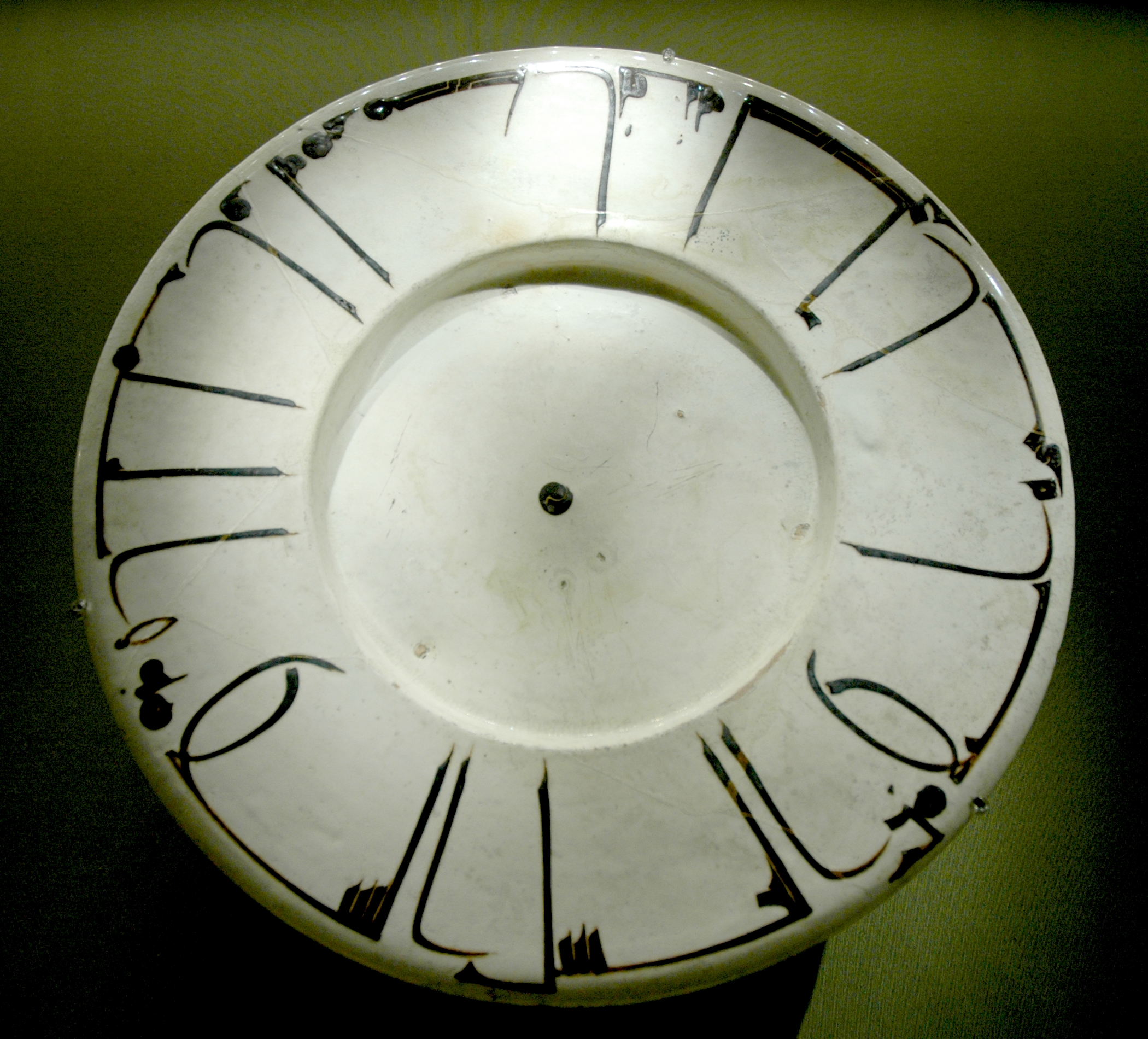
Samanid Epigraphic Dish

Samanid Epigraphic Ware refers to a distinct category of ceramics made in Central Asia during the ninth to eleventh centuries. The ceramics are distinguished by calligraphic inscriptions painted around the edge of the slipware, and are notable for the refinement and boldness of the calligraphic style. Samanid epigraphic ware is the first example of calligraphic embellishment on pottery, and is mostly seen on large plates and bowls used for gatherings but can also be found on jugs or jars.

== Historical context ==
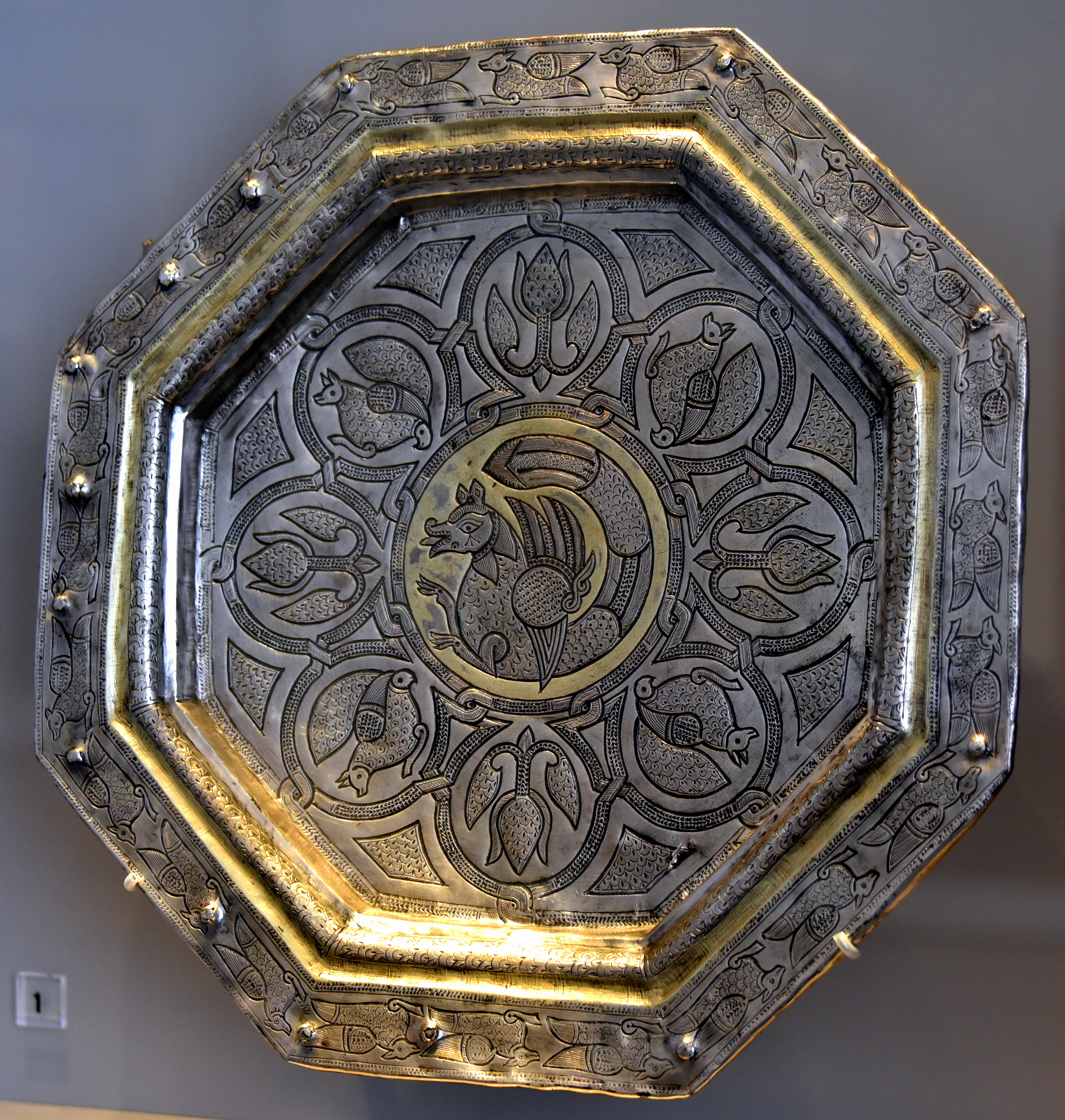
Figure 1. Senmurv Platter, Samanid, 9th- 10th century

The Samanid dynasty was of dehqan Iranian origin and justified their rise to power through claims of descent from the Mihrans of Bahram Chobin. (Note: Pourshariati refers to the Mihrans as Parthian, while Frye refers to Bahram Chobin as Sasanian.) The claim was particularly useful in promoting the usage and development of the Persian language through the patronage of poets and minstrels. Due to the fact that the dynasty was Islamic, this process was additionally significant for how it dispelled the notion of Islam as being tied to Arab ethnicity, thereby opening it up as a world religion.

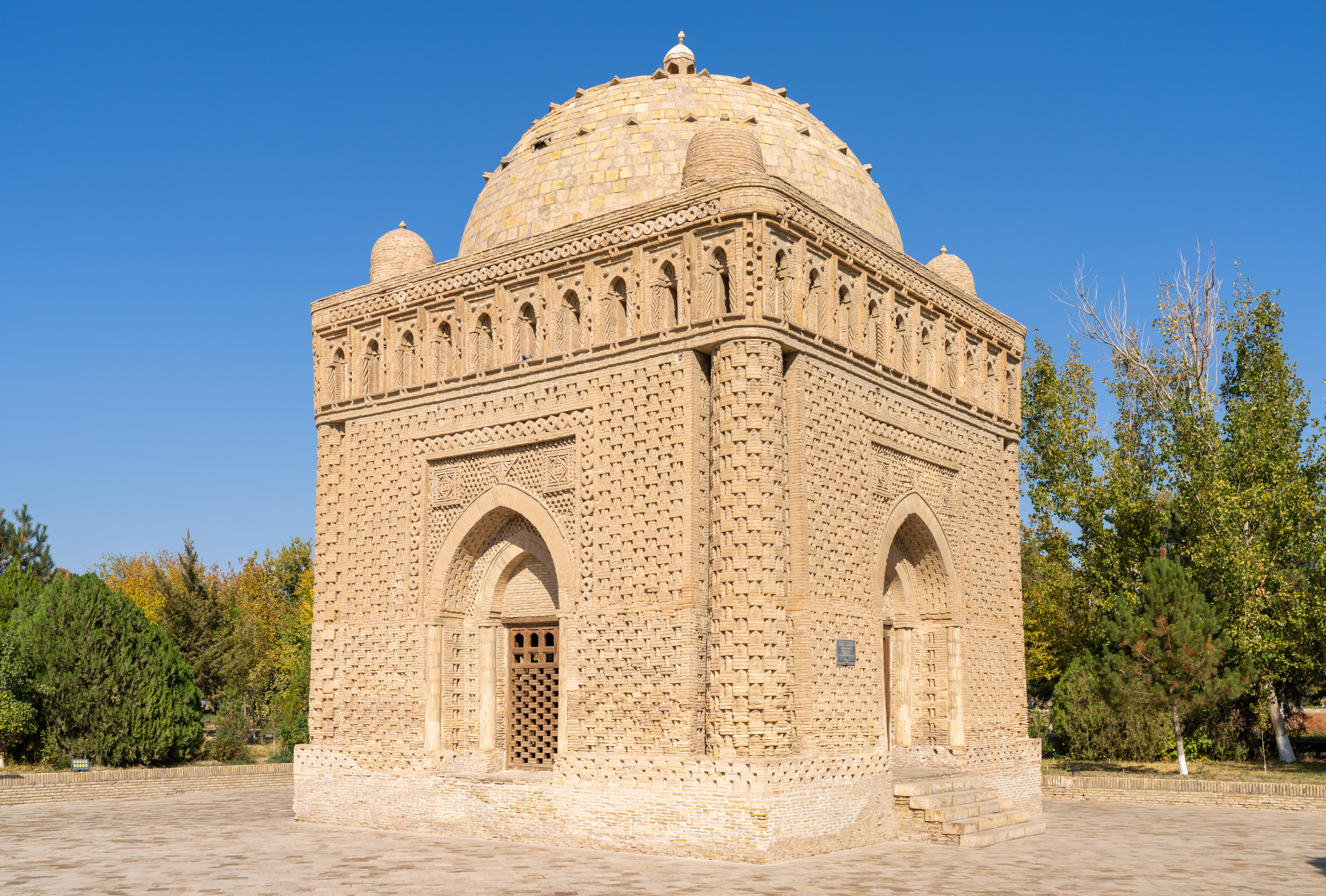
Figure 2. Mausoleum in Bukhara, Samanid

Though the dynasty is well recognized for its ceramics, its connections to surrounding and even preceding cultures can be gleaned from other products of its visual culture including textiles, silver, and architecture. Samanid textiles draw from Sasanian and Sogdian silks with their pearl borders and imagery of birds and other animals confronting each other, often carrying or wearing necklaces and scarves. Silver vessels and architecture similarly show Sasanian influences, the former in their crafting techniques and motifs, and the latter in how the dynasty's most well known structure, a mausoleum in Bukhara, has pearls lining its interior as well as a derivative of the four arches seen in Zoroastrian fire temples of Sasanian Iran.

== Production ==
=== Location ===
As Samanid epigraphic ware are the first examples of ceramics having calligraphic inscriptions, many scholars attribute influence to the style of metalwork inscription bands. Though the manufacture of these ceramics draws on pottery methods from Iraqi lusterware and Chinese slipware, decoration with Arabic inscription was completely new for the production of pottery during this time. The slipware can be traced back to Nishapur, Samarkand, and other Samanid cities. The production of Samanid epigraphic ware was a widespread occurrence in these locations, and these artifacts are still fairly widespread today. They can be found all over the world in collections of Islamic Art at the Met, Louvre, British Museum, and many other museums.

=== Methods ===
The method of production of the epigraphic ware was done in several steps. First, the clay had to be refined from local deposits. Then, the clay was shaped by the potter into the final form. This was most commonly a flat plate or bowl with flaring sides. The dish would then be dried to leather hardness so that detailed knife work could be done before becoming bone dry. Once fully dry, the slip and calligraphy could be added. The white slip coating the pottery is made from a diluted white clay pigment, but the most common colored slips were black, purple, or red, made from manganese or iron. The calligraphy was added mainly as a decorative element, although the inscriptions are always legible and sometimes the painter's decorative elements could be quite humorous. Finally, slipware was glazed and fired, usually at a temperature of 850-900 °C. It is likely that the entire process was not done by one person, but that several artists specializing in different disciplines would contribute to the creation of one dish.

== Uses ==
Samanid epigraphic wares are speculated to have been utilized for social gatherings of specific intellectual interests called majlis. The large size of the dishes indicates that the ceramic wares were designed for communal usage, for both eating off of and hand-washing before the meal. The wide rim of the plate is decorated with moral themes chosen so that highly educated gentleman-scholars could identify and appreciate the content of the inscriptions, distinguishing themselves as virtuous members of the social class. As their primary function of being containers of food, sharing a meal on a plate with inscribed adages served as a physical manifestation of the exchange of virtuous codes of conduct.

== Calligraphy and content ==
Script-bearing Samanid wares are largely regarded among the most significant trends of the Samanids owing to not only the content of the inscriptions (benedictions, proverbs, etc.), but also the decorative Kufic style script with which they are adorned.

To further understand Samanid epigraphic wares, graphology (a method of handwriting analysis) is applied to Samanid-era cups and bowls that bear Kufic inscriptions. Three main principles of graphology are applied to these slipwares to understand better the symbolic space of Samanid inscriptions: stroke, movement, and zone.

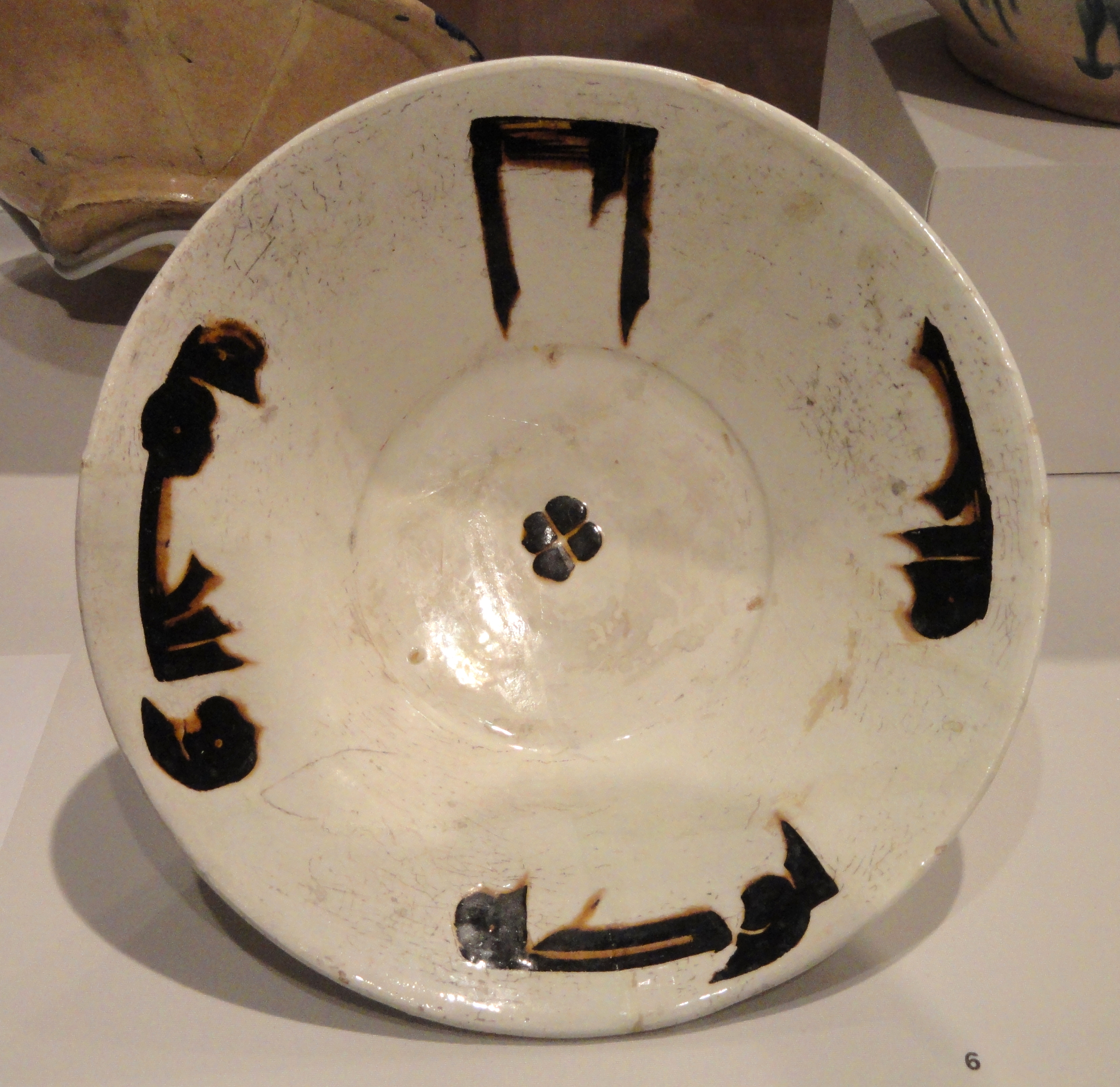
Figure 3. Samanid Bowl, Eastern Iran or Central Asia, c. 850-1000. Earthenware, slip painted under a transparent glaze, h. 6.5cm; max. Diam. 20.7cm; base diam. 8.8cm. Arthur M. Sackler Museum, Gift of John Goelet, 1979.375

The first principle, stroke, forms the foundation for the Kufic style of handwriting on Samanid slipware; it is composed of vertical, horizontal, and diagonal lines. These strokes correlate to form the overall "writing picture" or character. Similar to the concept of 'Proportional Script' in Kufic principles or the 'essence' in Samanid sciences, strokes are essential for letterform existence. Avicenna's logic encyclopedia outlines three conditions for understanding the Essential Universal and its Particulars, emphasizing the role of strokes in giving meaning to letterforms.

The principle of movement asserts that writing is dynamic, and a non-static process. In Kufic writing on Samanid slipware, rightward movement symbolizes the 'past', leftward the 'future', and vertical strokes denote the 'present'. Masoumzadeh suggests that the continuous decorative Kufic style on Samanid wares likely contains implicit meanings about time in the Samanid era.

Lastly, the 'Zone' principle interprets the vertical placement of letterforms, akin to the baselines of Kufic script. It divides writing space into upper, middle, and lower zones, reflecting the relationship between intellectuality, emotionality, and materiality.

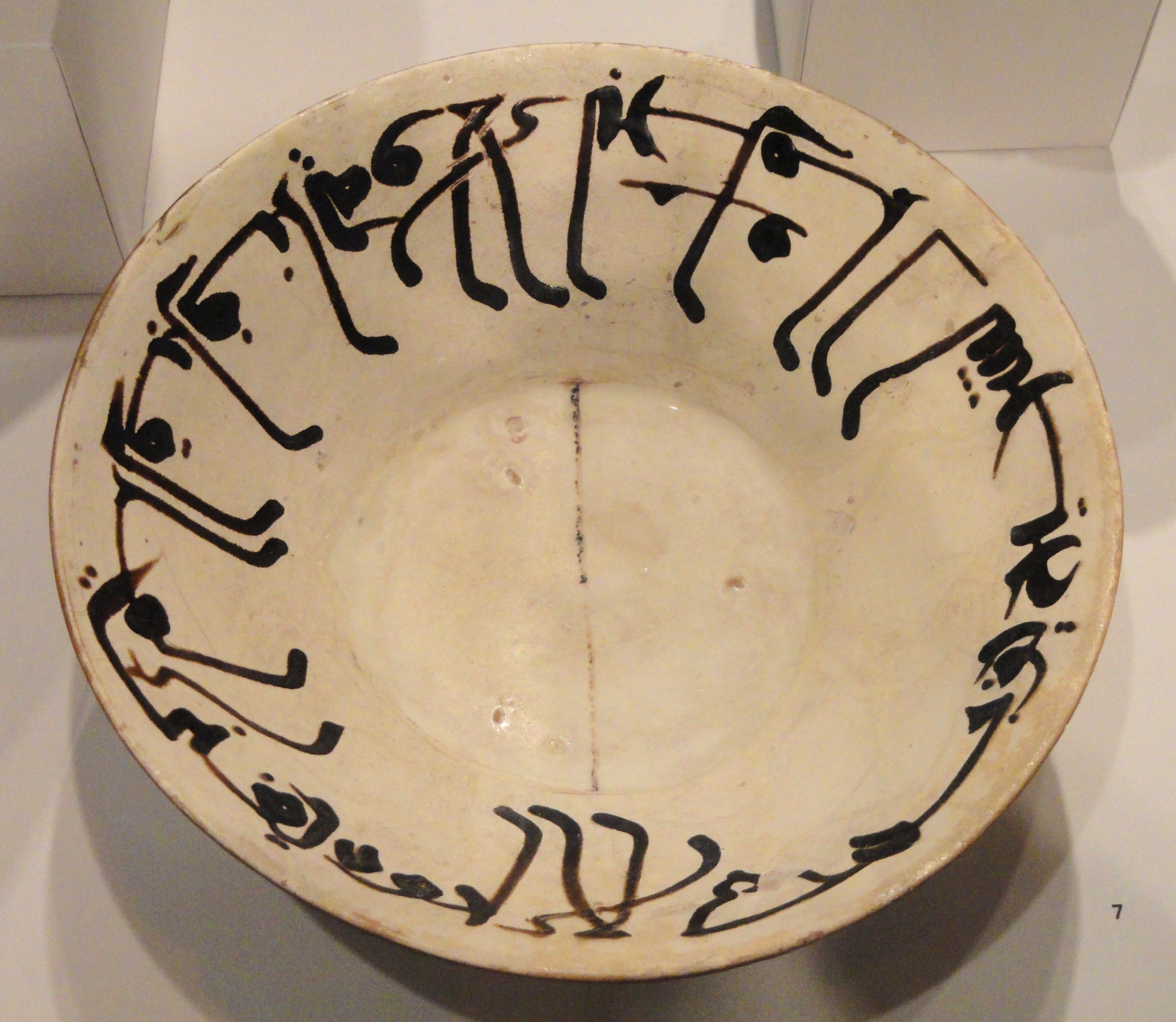
Figure 4. Samanid Bowl, probably Nishapur, Iran, c. 850-1000. Earthenware, slip painted under a transparent glaze, h. 7.3 cm; max. Diam. 25 cm; base diam. 11.4 cm. Arthur M. Sackler Museum, Gift of John Goelet, 1958.22

The content of these inscriptions, all in Arabic, fall into two main categories: proverbs and expressions of good wishes. The small Samanid Bowl from the Arthur M. Sackler Museum (Figure 3) represents many of its kind that convey good wishes: the translated inscription reads "Blessings and prosperity to its owner." Many Samanid epigraphic bowls are inscribed with similar general sentiments. One additional example is this Samanid calligraphic bowl from the Aga Khan Museum.

Beyond inscriptions that convey good wishes, another bowl from the Arthur M. Sackler Museum (Figure 4) represents a proverb that prescribes generosity and virtuous conduct (comprising two of the three main themes present in Samanid epigraphic pottery, as theorized by Pancaroglu). It reads, "Generosity does not consume wealth before it is exhausted, and greed will not increase a miser's wealth."

The third theme of proverbs present in dishes from the Samanid era relates to values attached to knowledge. These proverbs describe knowledge as both an ornament of character and a source of recitude. Epigraphic plates comprising such proverbs convey messages which read "Knowledge is an ornament for the valorous and reason is a crown of gold in paradise," among other things.

== Notes ==
=== Sources ===
- Blair, Sheila. Islamic Inscriptions. New York University Press, New York, 1998.
- Bosworth, C. E. (1973). "The Heritage of Rulership in Early Islamic Iran and the Search for Dynastic Connections with the Past". Iran. 11. Taylor & Francis: 51–62. doi:10.2307/4300484. JSTOR 4300484.
- Erlich, Gil (2015). "Samanid Epigraphic Ceramics". Tel Aviv University. doi:10.13140/RG.2.2.28742.09284.
- Flood, Finbarr B., and Gulru Necipoglu. A Companion to Islamic Art and Architecture. Wiley-Blackwell [Imprint], Hoboken, 2017.
- Frye, R.N. (1975). "The Samanids". In Frye, R.N. (ed.). The Cambridge History of Iran. Vol. 4: The Period from the Arab Invasion to the Saljuqs. Cambridge University Press.
- Grube, Ernst J., and Nasser D. Khalili Collection of Islamic Art. Cobalt and Lustre: The First Centuries of Islamic Pottery. vol. 9., Nour Foundation in association with Azimuth Editions and Oxford University Press, London, 1994.
- Masoumzadeh, Farnaz (2018). "Symbolic Space of Writing in Decorative Kufic of Samanid Slipwares". Zeichentragende Artefakte im sakralen Raum. pp. 199–214. doi:10.1515/9783110619928-009. ISBN 978-3-11-061992-8.
- Michailidis, Melanie (2012). "Samanid Silver and Trade along the Fur Route". Medieval Encounters. 18 (4–5): 315–338. doi:10.1163/15700674-12342119.
- Pancaroğlu, Oya (2002). "Serving Wisdom: The Contents of Samanid Epigraphic Pottery". In Kessler, Rochelle L. (ed.). Studies in Islamic and Later Indian Art from the Arthur M. Sackler Museum, Harvard University Art Museums. Harvard University Art Museums. pp. 59–75. ISBN 978-1-891771-22-4.
- Pourshariati, Parvenah (2011). Decline and Fall of the Sasanian Empire: The Sasanian-Parthian Confederacy and the Arab Conquest of Iran. I.B. Tauris.
- Sardar, Marika. “A Samanid Epigraphic Dish,” Khamseen: Islamic Art History Online, 28 August 2020.
- Volov, Lisa (1966). "Plaited Kufic on Samanid Epigraphic Pottery". Ars Orientalis. 6: 107–133. JSTOR 4629224.
- Wilkinson, Charles K., and Metropolitan Museum of Art (New York, N.Y.). Nishapur: Pottery of the Early Islamic Period. The Metropolitan Museum of Art, New York;Greenwich, Connecticut;, 1973.
