= Ibrahim ibn Ilyas =

- Amir of the Samanids
- Reign: Samanid (in Herat): 856–867
- Predecessor: Ilyas
- Successor: None
- Father: Ilyas ibn Asad

Ibrahim ibn Ilyas (Persian: ابراهیم بن الیاس) was a Samanid ruler of Herat (856 – c. 867). He was the son of Ilyas.

Upon his father's death in 856, Ibrahim was given control of the city of Herat. He afterwards became a military leader for the Tahirid governor of Khurasan, Muhammad ibn Tahir. Ibrahim was sent by Muhammad to battle the upstart Saffarid Ya'qub bin Laith in 867. Having been defeated near Pushang, he advised Muhammad to compromise with the Saffarid. Conflict between the two sides continued, however, and eventually Ibrahim was captured by the Saffarids at Nishapur and sent to Sistan. The Tahirids assumed direct control over Herat.

== Sources ==
- Frye, R.N. (1975). "The Sāmānids". In Frye, Richard N. (ed.). The Cambridge History of Iran: From the Arab Invasion to the Saljuqs. Vol. 4. Cambridge: Cambridge University Press. pp. 136–161. ISBN 0-521-20093-8.

Preceded by: Ilyas	Samanid Ruler (in Herat); 856–c. 867	Followed by: None (Direct rule by Tahirids)
