= Jia Dao =

Chinese Buddhist monk and poet

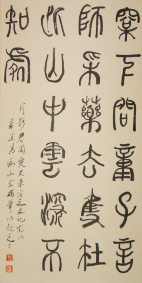
《尋隱者不遇》 賈島 松下問童子 言師採藥去 只在此山中 雲深不知處 Seeking the Master but not Meeting by Jia Dao Beneath a pine I asked a little child. / He said the Master went to gather herbs. / Alone was he upon this mountainside, / The clouds so deep he knew not where he was.

Jia Dao (traditional Chinese: 賈島; simplified Chinese: 贾岛; pinyin: Jiǎ Dǎo; Wade–Giles: Chia Tao) (779–843), courtesy name Langxian (浪仙), was a Chinese Buddhist monk and poet active during the Tang dynasty.

== Biography ==
Jia Dao was born near modern Beijing; after a period as a Buddhist monk, he went to Chang'an. He became one of Han Yu's disciples, but failed the jinshi exam several times. He wrote both discursive gushi and lyric jintishi. His works were criticised as "thin" by Su Shi, and some other commentators have considered them limited and artificial.

According to Dr. James J.Y. Liu (1926–1986), a professor of Chinese and comparative literature, Jia's poem The Swordsman (劍客) "seems...to sum up the spirit of knight errantry in four lines." "The Swordsman" reads in Liu's translation as follows:

For ten years I have been polishing this sword;
Its frosty edge has never been put to the test.
Now I am holding it and showing it to you, sir:
Is there anyone suffering from injustice?

A metric translation of the original Chinese poem with one iamb per Chinese character reads as follows:

A decade long I honed a single sword,
Its steel-cold blade still yet to test its song.
Today I hold it out to you, my lord,
and ask: "Who seeks deliverance from a wrong?"

The original Chinese:

劍客: 十年磨一劍, 霜刃未曾試. 今日把示君, 誰有不平事.

The opening line of The Swordsman is often used as a proverb to refer to a long and arduous undertaking.

== See also ==
- Classical Chinese poetry
- Han Yu
- Li He
- Luoyang
- Meng Jiao
- Tang poetry

== Sources ==
Pine, Red, and Mike O'Connor. The clouds should know me by now: Buddhist poet monks of China. Boston: Wisdom Publications, 1999. Includes selection of dual-language poems.
