= 751 =

Calendar year

751 in various calendars
Gregorian calendar	751; DCCLI
Ab urbe condita	1504
Armenian calendar	200; ԹՎ Մ
Assyrian calendar	5501
Balinese saka calendar	672–673
Bengali calendar	157–158
Berber calendar	1701
Buddhist calendar	1295
Burmese calendar	113
Byzantine calendar	6259–6260
Chinese calendar	庚寅年 (Metal Tiger); 3448 or 3241 — to — 辛卯年 (Metal Rabbit); 3449 or 3242
Coptic calendar	467–468
Discordian calendar	1917
Ethiopian calendar	743–744
Hebrew calendar	4511–4512
- Hindu calendars
Vikram Samvat	807–808
Shaka Samvat	672–673
Kali Yuga	3851–3852
Holocene calendar	10751
Iranian calendar	129–130
Islamic calendar	133–134
Japanese calendar	Tenpyō-shōhō 3 (天平勝宝３年)
Javanese calendar	645–646
Julian calendar	751; DCCLI
Korean calendar	3084
Minguo calendar	1161 before ROC 民前1161年
Nanakshahi calendar	−717
Seleucid era	1062/1063 AG
Thai solar calendar	1293–1294
Tibetan calendar	ལྕགས་ཕོ་སྟག་ལོ་ (male Iron-Tiger); 877 or 496 or −276 — to — ལྕགས་མོ་ཡོས་ལོ་ (female Iron-Hare); 878 or 497 or −275

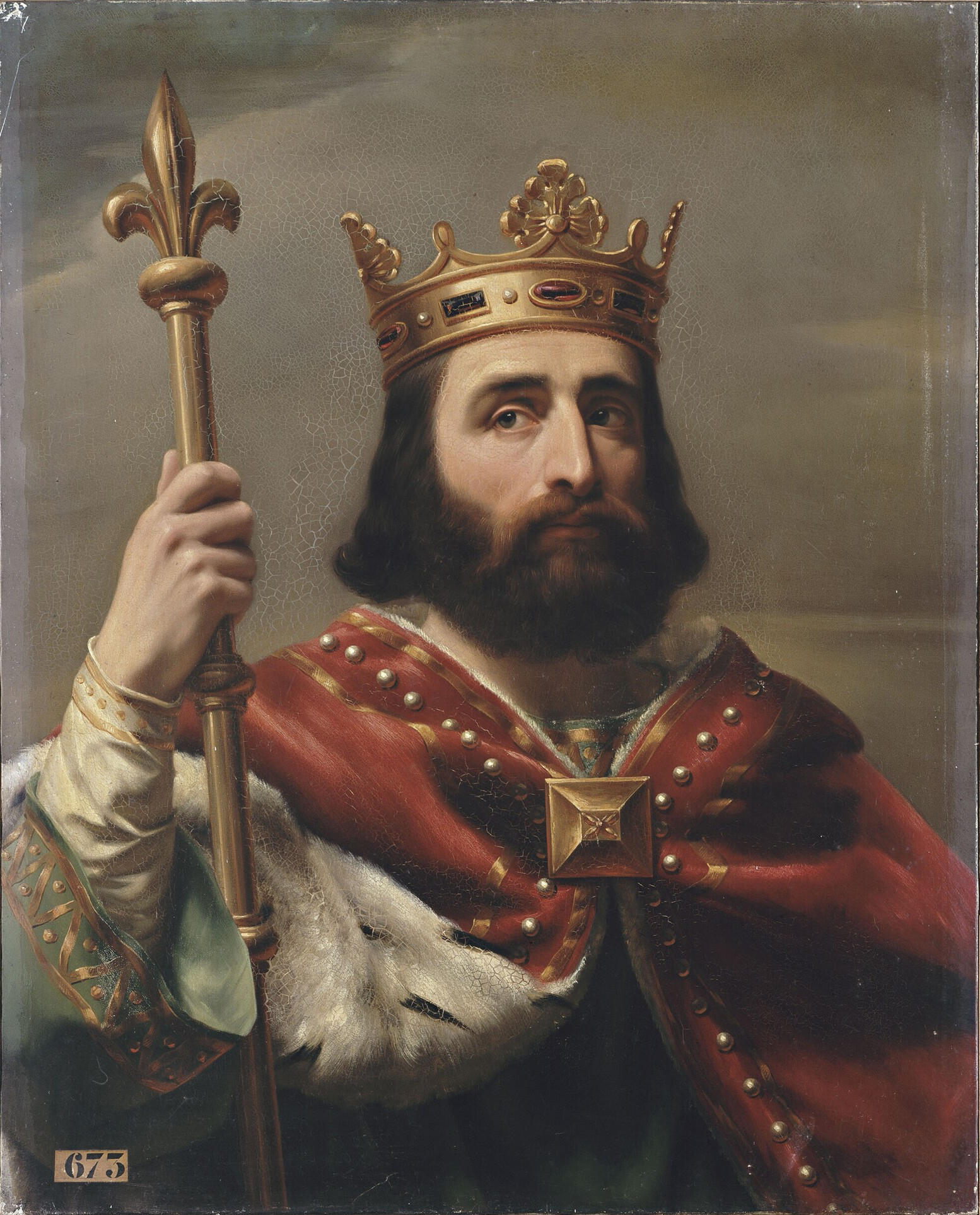
King Pepin III (the Short) (714-768; reigned 751–768).

Year 751 (DCCLI) was a common year starting on Friday of the Julian calendar. The denomination 751 for this year has been used since the early medieval period, when the Anno Domini calendar era became the prevalent method in Europe for naming years.

== Events ==
=== By place ===
==== Byzantine Empire ====
- June – Leo IV, son of Emperor Constantine V, is crowned co-emperor at Constantinople. Only a year or so after his mother Irene died, Constantine's second wife Maria dies, at approximately the same time as Leo's coronation.

==== Europe ====
- November – Pepin the Short, youngest son of Charles Martel, forces the last Merovingian king Childeric III to retire to the monastery of Saint-Bertin. He proclaims himself as king of the Franks with the support of Pope Zachary, and is crowned at Soissons by Boniface, bishop of Mainz, becoming, as Pepin III, the first Carolingian monarch of the Frankish Kingdom.
- King Aistulf of the Lombards captures Ravenna and the Romagna, ending the Byzantine Exarchate of Ravenna. The last exarch Eutychius is killed by the Lombards. Aistulf threatens Rome, claiming a capitation tax. Pope Zachary, alarmed, appeals for aid from the Byzantine Empire, but his request is declined.

==== Abbasid Caliphate ====
- Battle of Talas: First recorded encounter (and the last) between Arab and Chinese forces. The rulers of Tashkent and Ferghana are both nominal vassals of the Tang Dynasty; the Chinese have intervened on behalf of Ferghana in a conflict between the two; the Abbasid Caliphate, competing with the Chinese for control of Central Asia, has become involved. Arab forces from Samarkand have marched to challenge a Chinese army (30,000 men) under Gao Xianzhi. Gao has had a series of military victories in the region, but his Turkish contingent, Karluk mercenaries, defects. Out of 10,000 Tang troops, only 2,000 manage to return from the Talas River to China. The Arabs triumph, and they will remain the dominant force in Transoxiana for the next 150 years.
- Muslim introduction of papermaking: The first paper mill in the Islamic world begins production at Samarkand. Captured craftsmen, taken at the Battle of Talas River, have by some accounts revealed the technique of papermaking (although paper may have arrived from China much earlier via the Silk Road). Arab scholars will use paper to produce translations of Ancient Greek and Roman writings.

==== Asia ====
- Like the storm of 721, the storm of this year at the southern Chinese seaport of Yangzhou reportedly destroys over 1,000 ships engaged in canal and river traffic (approximate date).
- The Japanese poetry anthology Kaifūsō is assembled.

=== By topic ===
==== Religion ====
- Kim Daeseong, chief minister of Silla, orders the construction of the Bulguksa and Seokguram temples at Gyeongju (South Korea).
- The oldest surviving printed document, a Buddhist scripture, is printed in Korea.
- Theodore succeeds Theophylact as Orthodox Patriarch of Antioch.
- The Great Buddha at Tōdai-ji in Nara (Japan) is completed.

== Births ==
- June 28 – Carloman I, king of the Franks (d. 771)
- Adalard of Corbie, Frankish abbot (approximate date)
- Meng Jiao, Chinese poet (d. 814)

== Deaths ==
- June – Maria, Byzantine empress
- Childebrand I, duke of Burgundy (b. 678)
- Eutychius, Byzantine exarch of Ravenna
- Fergus mac Fogartaig, king of Brega (Ireland)
- Gisulf II, duke of Benevento (approximate date)
- Mansur ibn Jumhur al-Kalbi, Arab governor of Sindh
- Taki, Japanese princess and Saiō
