= 735 =

Calendar year

735 in various calendars
Gregorian calendar	735; DCCXXXV
Ab urbe condita	1488
Armenian calendar	184; ԹՎ ՃՁԴ
Assyrian calendar	5485
Balinese saka calendar	656–657
Bengali calendar	141–142
Berber calendar	1685
Buddhist calendar	1279
Burmese calendar	97
Byzantine calendar	6243–6244
Chinese calendar	甲戌年 (Wood Dog); 3432 or 3225 — to — 乙亥年 (Wood Pig); 3433 or 3226
Coptic calendar	451–452
Discordian calendar	1901
Ethiopian calendar	727–728
Hebrew calendar	4495–4496
- Hindu calendars
Vikram Samvat	791–792
Shaka Samvat	656–657
Kali Yuga	3835–3836
Holocene calendar	10735
Iranian calendar	113–114
Islamic calendar	116–117
Japanese calendar	Tenpyō 7 (天平７年)
Javanese calendar	628–629
Julian calendar	735; DCCXXXV
Korean calendar	3068
Minguo calendar	1177 before ROC 民前1177年
Nanakshahi calendar	−733
Seleucid era	1046/1047 AG
Thai solar calendar	1277–1278
Tibetan calendar	ཤིང་ཕོ་ཁྱི་ལོ་ (male Wood-Dog); 861 or 480 or −292 — to — ཤིང་མོ་ཕག་ལོ་ (female Wood-Boar); 862 or 481 or −291

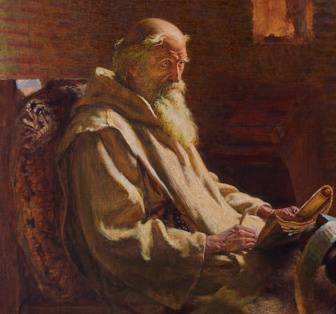
Bede (the "Venerable") translates John

Year 735 (DCCXXXV) was a common year starting on Saturday of the Julian calendar. The denomination 735 for this year has been used since the early medieval period, when the Anno Domini calendar era became the prevalent method in Europe for naming years.

== Events ==
=== By place ===
==== Europe ====
- Charles Martel, Merovingian mayor of the palace, invades Burgundy. Duke Hunald I of Aquitaine refuses to recognise the authority of the Franks, whereupon Charles marches south of the River Loire, seizing the cities of Bordeaux and Blaye. Within 4 years he will have subdued all the Burgundian chieftains, while continuing to fight off Moorish advances into Gaul.
- King Liutprand of the Lombards raises his nephew Hildeprand to co-kingship, after a serious illness (approximate date).
- Siege of al-Sakhra: Moors under Uqba ibn al-Hajjaj (governor of Al-Andalus) besiege Pelagius, king of Asturias, in the uppermost Northern mountain ranges in Iberia. The battle ends inconclusively, with Pelagius surviving, but 270 out of his 300 followers are killed (at least according to a Muslim chronicle from the 11th century).

==== Asia ====
- During the Tang dynasty in China, by this year there is 149,685,400 kg (165,000 short tons) of grain shipped annually along the Grand Canal.
- A major smallpox epidemic starts in Japan, which reduces the population by 30%.

==== Armenia ====
- 735 Vayots Dzor Province earthquake. It affects the Vayots Dzor Province.The earthquake reportedly destroys an entire valley. The reported casualties include at least 10,000 victims.

=== By topic ===
==== Literature ====
- The Khöshöö Tsaidam Monuments of Bilge Khan, ruler (khagan) of the Turkic Khaganate, and his brother Kul Tigin, are erected. (Bilge has already erected Kül Tigin's monument and Bilge's son erects Bilge's monument.)

==== Religion ====
- May 26 – Bede, Anglo-Saxon monk-historian, dies at Monkwearmouth–Jarrow Abbey. He will be remembered as "the Venerable", and is the author of books that are copied and studied later all over Europe. His greatest book is the Historia ecclesiastica gentis Anglorum, a major source for the history of Britain, in the immediate post-Roman period.
- The see of York receives the pallium from pope Gregory III, and is elevated to an archbishopric. Ecgbert becomes the first archbishop.

== Births ==
- Alcuin, Anglo-Saxon missionary (approximate date)
- Du You, chancellor of the Tang dynasty (d. 812)
- Kardam, ruler (khan) of the Bulgarian Empire
- Plato of Sakkoudion, Byzantine abbot (approximate date)

== Deaths ==
- May 26 – Bede, Anglo-Saxon theologian and historian
- December 6 – Toneri, Japanese prince (b. 676)
- Abi Ishaq, Arab grammarian (approximate date)
- Adela of Pfalzel, Frankish noblewoman, abbess, and Catholic saint (approximate date)
- Cathal mac Muiredaig, king of Connacht (Ireland)
- Cellach mac Fáelchair, king of Osraige (Ireland)
- Eudes, duke of Aquitaine (approximate date)

== Sources ==
- Guidoboni, Emanuela; Traina, Giusto (1995), "A new catalogue of earthquakes in the historical Armenian area from antiquity to the 12th century", Annals of Geophysics, 38, doi:10.4401/ag-4134
