= AD 787 =

Calendar year

787 in various calendars
- Gregorian calendar: 787; DCCLXXXVII
- Ab urbe condita: 1540
- Armenian calendar: 236; ԹՎ ՄԼԶ
- Assyrian calendar: 5537
- Balinese saka calendar: 708–709
- Bengali calendar: 193–194
- Berber calendar: 1737
- Buddhist calendar: 1331
- Burmese calendar: 149
- Byzantine calendar: 6295–6296
- Chinese calendar: 丙寅年 (Fire Tiger); 3484 or 3277 — to — 丁卯年 (Fire Rabbit); 3485 or 3278
- Coptic calendar: 503–504
- Discordian calendar: 1953
- Ethiopian calendar: 779–780
- Hebrew calendar: 4547–4548
- Hindu calendars
- Vikram Samvat: 843–844
- Shaka Samvat: 708–709
- Kali Yuga: 3887–3888
- Holocene calendar: 10787
- Iranian calendar: 165–166
- Islamic calendar: 170–171
- Japanese calendar: Enryaku 6 (延暦６年)
- Javanese calendar: 682–683
- Julian calendar: 787; DCCLXXXVII
- Korean calendar: 3120
- Minguo calendar: 1125 before ROC 民前1125年
- Nanakshahi calendar: −681
- Seleucid era: 1098/1099 AG
- Thai solar calendar: 1329–1330
- Tibetan calendar: མེ་ཕོ་སྟག་ལོ་ (male Fire-Tiger); 913 or 532 or −240 — to — མེ་མོ་ཡོས་ལོ་ (female Fire-Hare); 914 or 533 or −239

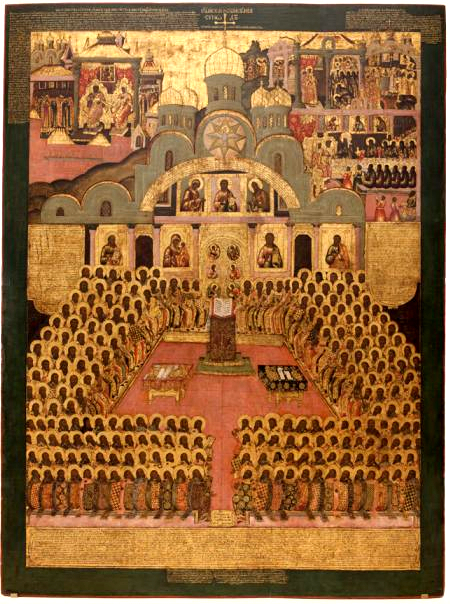
The Second Council of Nicaea (787)

Year 787 (DCCLXXXVII) was a common year starting on Monday of the Julian calendar. The denomination 787 for this year has been used since the early medieval period, when the Anno Domini calendar era became the prevalent method in Europe for naming years.

== Events ==
=== By place ===
==== Byzantine Empire ====
- Empress Irene sends a Byzantine expeditionary army to invade southern Italy, but it is defeated and driven out (at Pope Adrian I's urging) by the Frankish army, allied with the forces of Benevento. She breaks off the engagement (see 782) between her son Constantine VI and the Frankish princess Rotrude, daughter of King Charlemagne.

==== Europe ====
- August 26 – Arechis II, autonomous prince (or duke) of Benevento, dies. Grimoald III, taken hostage by the Franks, succeeds his father as ruler of Benevento.
- Maurizio Galbaio, doge of Venice, dies after a 22-year reign and is succeeded by his son Giovanni. He begins a vendetta against the patriarch of Grado (Italy).

==== Britain ====
- Kings Offa of Mercia and Beorhtric of Wessex call the Synod of Chelsea in Kent, which is attended by the Papal legates. There, Offa persuades the Papacy to grant Archepiscopal status to the Mercian See of Lichfield. In order to secure the royal succession, he has Hygeberht crown his son Ecgfrith king of Mercia at Brixworth.

=== By topic ===
==== Religion ====
- Second Council of Nicaea: Empress Irene restores the veneration of icons (images of Christ and saints). This is a major victory of the monks, who will advance extensive claims to complete freedom for the Eastern Orthodox Church in religious matters. This ends the iconoclastic period in the Byzantine Empire.

== Births ==
- Abu Ma'shar al-Balkhi, Muslim scholar and astrologer (approximate date)
- Li Deyu, chancellor of the Tang Dynasty (d. 850)
- Muhammad ibn Harun al-Amin, Muslim caliph (d. 813)

== Deaths ==
- August 26 – Arechis II, duke of Benevento
- December 13 – Agilfride, bishop of Liège
- Hyecho, Korean Buddhist monk (b. 704)
- Maurizio Galbaio, doge of Venice
- Willibald, bishop of Eichstätt (approximate date)
