= Ilyas ibn Asad =

- Amir of Herat
- Reign: 819–856
- Predecessor: None
- Successor: Ibrahim
- Died: c. 856
- Issue: Ibrahim ibn Ilyas
- Father: Asad ibn Saman
- Religion: Islam

Abu'l Fazl Ilyas ibn Asad (died 856) was a Samanid ruler of Herat (819–856). He was one of the four sons of Asad.

In 819 Ilyas was granted authority over the city of Herat by Caliph al-Ma'mun's governor of Khorasan, Ghassan ibn 'Abbad, as a reward for his support against the rebel Rafi' ibn Laith. Unlike his other three brothers, Ilyas was not given a city in Transoxiana.

Ilyas and his family seem to have acted more in the capacity of officers of the Tahirid dynasty (governors of Khorasan under the Abbasids) than as administrators of Herat. In July 823, Ilyas was sent to Sistan by Talha ibn Tahir to oppose the Kharijites, but he only remained there until October of the same year. He then served as a governor of Alexandria under Abdallah ibn Tahir in 827. When Abdallah ibn Tahir was governor of Khorasan, Ilyas was twice sent along with some cadet members of the Samanid dynasty to Sistan—first c. 831, then between 837 and 840. He died in Herat in 855, after which control of the city was given to his son Ibrahim.

== Sources ==
- Daniel, Elton L. (2020). "Khorasan vi. History in the Taherid and Samanid Periods". In Yarshater, Ehsan (ed.). Encyclopædia Iranica. Vol. XVI: Kashan–Kešaʾi Dialect (Online ed.). Encyclopædia Iranica Foundation. pp. 631–641.
- Frye, R.N. (1975). "The Sāmānids". In Frye, R.N. (ed.). The Cambridge History of Iran, Volume 4: From the Arab Invasion to the Saljuqs. Cambridge: Cambridge University Press. pp. 136–161. ISBN 0-521-20093-8.

Preceded by: None	Samanid Ruler (in Herat); 819–856	Followed by: Ibrahim
