= Sugano no Mamichi =

Sugano no Mamichi 菅野真道
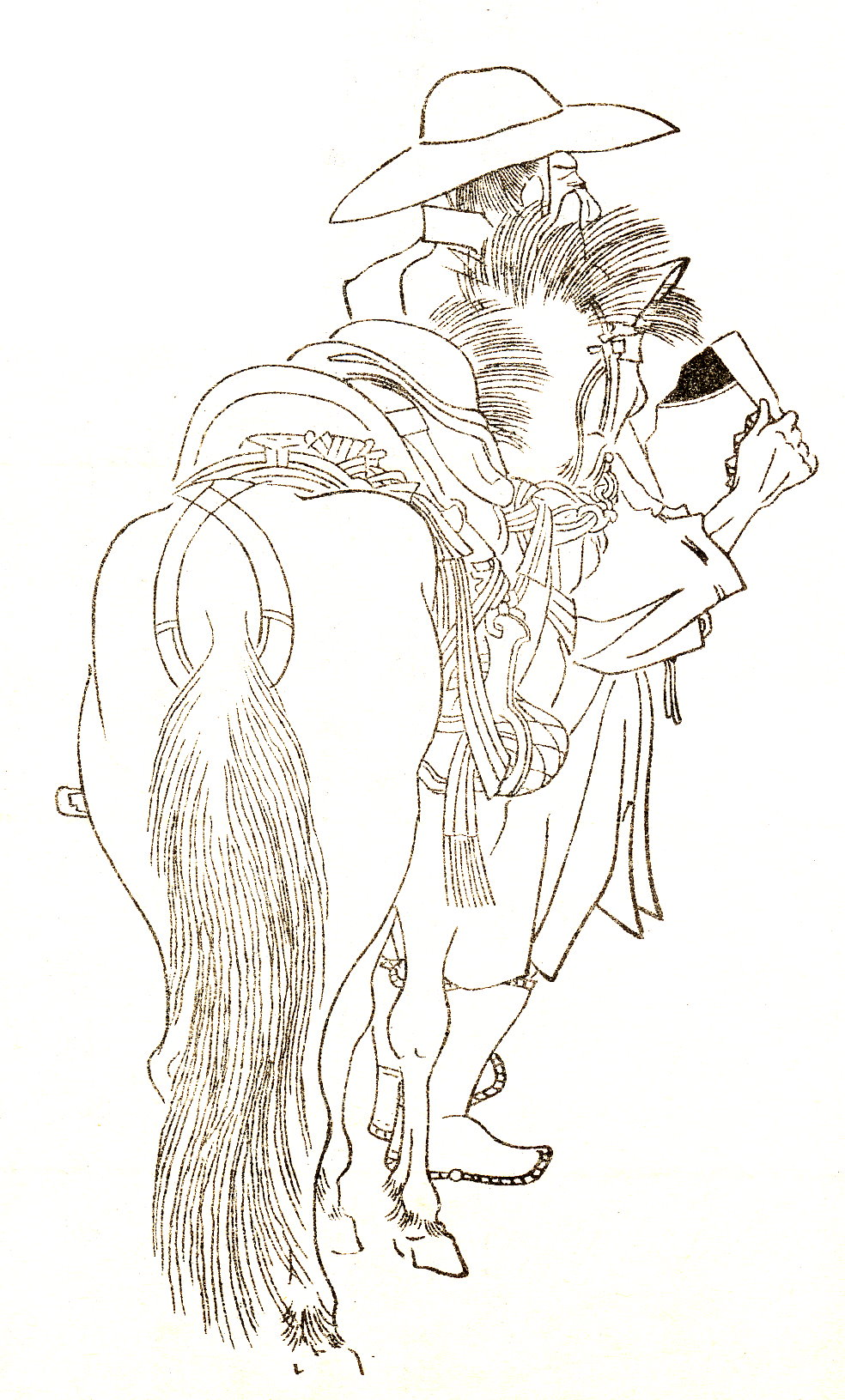
- Illustration by Kikuchi Yōsai, from "Zenken-Kojitsu"
- Born: 741
- Died: July 23, 814
- Father: Tsu no Yamamori (津山守)

Sugano no Mamichi (菅野真道; 741 – July 23, 814), originally known as Tsu no Mamichi (津真道), was a Japanese noble of the early Heian period. He reached the court rank of ju san-mi (従三位) and the position of sangi.

== Life ==
In 778, Mamichi was appointed as an assistant draftsman and editor (少内記, shō-naiki) in the Ministry of the Center. In 783, he was conferred the rank of gai (外) ju go-i no ge (従五位下). In this period, he also held various posts in the imperial guard and as a regional administrator. In 785, with the investiture of Prince Ate, the future Emperor Heizei, as Crown Prince, Mamichi was promoted to ju go-i no ge (従五位下) and appointed the Crown Prince's tutor in the Confucian classics (東宮学士, tōgū-gakushi). In 790 Mamichi appealed to have his family's rank increased from muraji to ason, and was granted the new family name of Sugano no Ason, based on his place of residence.

Thanks to the confidence of Emperor Kanmu, Mamichi was able to hold increasingly important positions in the imperial guard and the daijō-kan. He was also deeply involved as an assistant director in the construction of the new capital at Heian-kyō. During the same period, his court rank steadily rose, to ju go-i no jō (従五位上) in 789, shō go-i no ge (正五位下) in 791, ju shi-i no ge (従四位下) in 794, and shō shi-i no ge (正四位下) in 797.

Along with Fujiwara no Tsuginawa and Akishino no Yasuhito, Mamichi worked on the compilation and editing of the Shoku Nihongi, completing its 40 volumes in 797. In 805, he joined the ranks of the kugyō with a promotion to sangi. Later that year, he held a heated debate with Fujiwara no Otsugu (徳政論争, tokusei-ronsō), in which Otsugu argued that the planned campaign against the Emishi in the north and construction of the capital were overburdening the populace and should be stopped. Mamichi was strongly opposed to this, but the Emperor was convinced by Otsugu's argument, and the plans were halted.

With the ascension of Emperor Heizei in 806, Mamichi was promoted to shō shi-i no jō (正四位上). In 807, the kansatsu-shi (観察使) police force was established, and Mamichi placed in charge of the San'indō region. In 809, he was promoted to ju san-mi (従三位) and placed in charge of Tōkaidō. In 811, during the reign of Emperor Saga, Mamichi reached the age of 70 and retired from his post as sangi. He died on July 23, 814 at the age of 74, with the rank of ju san-mi (従三位) and as governor of Hitachi Province.

== Genealogy ==
According to the Shinsen Shōjiroku, Mamichi was descended from the 14th king of Baekje, Geungusu of Baekje.

- Father: Tsu no Yamamori (津山守)
- Mother: Unknown
  - Son: Sugano no Takayo (菅野高世) - Poet, one work in the Kokin Wakashū
  - Son: Sugano no Nagamine (菅野永峯)
  - Daughter: Sugano no Hitokazu (菅野人数; ?–863)
  - Daughter: Wife of Fujiwara no Yamahito (藤原山人室)
