= Capitulare de villis =

Medieval Latin text

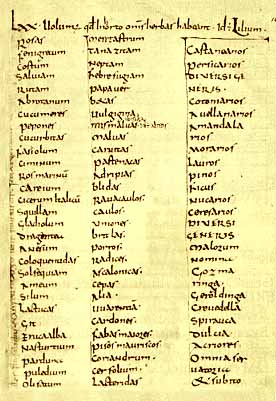
Capitulare de villis vel curtis imperii LXX

The Capitulare de villis is a text composed sometime in the late 8th or early 9th century that guided the governance of the royal estates, possibly during the later years of the reign of Charlemagne (c. 768–814). It lists, in no particular order, a series of rules and regulations on how to manage the lands, animals, justice, and overall administration of the king's property and assets. The document was meant to lay out the instructions and criteria for managing Charlemagne's estates and was thus an important part of his reform of Carolingian government and administration.

A comparison with the Brevium Exempla, which records actual audits of several estates, shows that de Villis was a largely aspirational document which did not always (if ever) correspond to reality.

== Historical context ==
The Capitulare de villis is one of several capitularies issued by Carolingian royalty to address the organization and administration of their estates. This document is significant with regards to understanding Carolingian culture, administrative, and social-reform programs. Capitulare de villis along with 254 other manuscripts at the Herzog August Library in Germany are the only surviving administrative documents from Charlemagne's reign discussing detailed estate management and revenue collection.

The capitulary is of disputed origin and was "variously claimed for Fulda or the Rhineland ... containing a group of texts associated with the royal court". There were also disputes regarding its publication date and under what circumstances the document was created. The general consensus is that the Capitulare de villis dates back to sometime between the years 771 and 800.

This document was developed in a time of change and transition. As the Carolingian court became a stationary body at a palace, the document was likely created in an effort to manage the logistical difficulties of supplying and maintaining the food and equipment for an administration at some distance from its estates, thereby ensuring that politicians and soldiers would be well provisioned. The amount of detail included in the Capitulare de villis speaks to the king's attention to government and the simplified form of administration at the time. Thus, although the Capitulare de villis is no longer used as a tool to understand the entire economic and social structure of the Carolingian world, it remains an important document for understanding Carolingian material culture and political administration.

== Content ==
The Capitulare de villis is not arranged in any logical order but instead jumps between different topics throughout the course of the document's seventy chapters. Topics were not treated equally by the author as some are longer and go into more detail than others. The text is much more specific in regard to crops and animals and tends to become more vague in regard to everyday care of livestock such as chickens and other less prevalent material.

=== Duties and administration ===
The majority of the Capitulare de villis is given over to describing the duties of the iudex, "an official tasked with the care of royal properties or the duties of their subordinates". It is mandated that "each steward shall perform his service in full, according to his instructions". The document includes many duties including warning officials against corruption, protection of the properties from being stolen, fairly prosecuting criminals, and presenting the king with certain items once annually. The most important duty described in this document, however, was creating an accurate inventory and facilitating the transportation of an estate's food, money, and goods to the Carolingian court.

As a whole, the document "lays administrative groundwork for the court to effectively manage royal properties and secure income for the palace from a distance". In terms of administering royal properties, the description of which takes up a sizable amount of space in the Capitulare de villis, the text outlines supplying various estate buildings and properties and caring for livestock but is noticeably less specific when it came to details in agricultural production, simply stating quotas for some crops rather than methods of growing them.

=== Justice ===
The capitulary makes several mentions of how justice is to be handled on the king's estates in his absence and gives responsibility to the iudices to uphold the law. The text states that "[a]s far as concerns other men, let the stewards be careful to give them the justice to which they have a right, as the law directs". This demonstrates that the iudex was not only a servant to the king in terms of administering his properties but also was the king's representative of sorts when it came to dispensing justice if need be.

=== Animals ===
Care of farm animals such as chickens and cows is stipulated in the Capitulare de villis but the text does not go into much more detail. Much attention is given to the care of puppies and horses to perhaps highlight the importance of these animals to the king in hunting and warfare.

=== Land and food ===
Land use is outlined for the stewards, stating that fish ponds, byres, pigsties, sheepfolds, goat-pens, mills, and barns should all be included in the property. The amount of land that should be protected as forest space and the amount that should be cleared is also stipulated. The capitulary also gives some indication of a system of villae on royal estates kept ready and fully equipped to receive the king. and is designed to guarantee that certain basic necessities were to be found in each of the residences. Thus, the document is necessary to ensure that the estate was prepared at any given time for the king's use and that the land use suited his needs.

In terms of food, less instruction is given in terms of how and where to grow them but the iudex is tasked with ensuring both quantity and quality. Special attention is paid to wine, especially how it should be made and stored. In case of excess production, the "[p]rovision is made for the sale of fish and other goods that are not used because the king did not visit".

=== Craftsmen and tools ===
The capitulary played a role in craftsmanship on the estates, mandating that a certain number of workers of different trades, from blacksmiths to weavers, work on the estate at all times. The Capitulare de villis also refers to providing certain materials for trade, particularly mentioning certain lands that were part of the estate where iron ore could be found and thereby supply blacksmiths with the raw materials for their trade. Workplaces were also mentioned in the document. Facilities where women worked with textiles was mentioned demonstrating a link between the document and the administration of trade.

== Historical significance ==
=== Military ===
The Capitulare de villis played a role in preparing the king's estates to aid him in the event of military conflict by supplying provisions and materials. Particular reference is made to carts and produce for the army. Ultimately "[t]hese military provisions of the CV were geared towards logistical preparations for campaigns".

Horses and horse breeding were also an important part of these efforts. In order to properly prepare an army for combat, Charlemagne needed war horses as colts on his estates. Special attention was devoted in the capitulary to how horses should be cared for including how they should be bred. Horses were specifically mentioned as items of value that should be included in the annual inventories of the estates.

While the capitulary does not explicitly link horse care and breeding with military action, the fact that provisions for the army are mentioned elsewhere coupled with the care and attention that the text pays to horses, and colts in particular, suggests that there was a certain military focus being considered. Overall, the Capitulare de villis can shed some light on the type of preparations made for military conflict in this period and the pre-emptive consideration that the king put into such endeavours.

=== Women ===
A certain amount of historical evidence regarding the role of women can also be discerned from the Capitulare de villis. Where the text delves into the management of the king's estates, it reveals that his queen would also be expected to take part in these duties. While the document illustrates that the king already had male stewards taking responsibility for much of the managerial upkeep of the estates, it also mentions that the queen has overlapping duties and overarching authority over the operation as a whole including the stewards themselves and could direct their work as she saw fit. Overall, it may be possible to employ what is known about the queen's role from this capitulary in order to gain a better understanding of elite women at this time and the responsibilities they had with regard to family estates.

Considering the position of women and their responsibilities when it came to hospitality in particular may give insight into the ways in which aristocratic women likely controlled or helped to manage the estates. When the capitulary mentions the number of beds and linens among other essentials to be kept on hand, these would have been items that women were especially concerned with due to their role in ensuring the comfort of guests in their home. Furthermore, the Capitulare de villis makes note of the fact that, when the queen sent orders to a steward or any other official on the estate through the butler or seneschal, those orders were meant to be obeyed and the "authority of the queen to give such orders, especially through these two officers, probably derived from her responsibility for the provision of hospitality; her interests extended both to entertaining guests while appropriately displaying the wealth of the family and to providing meat for gathering aristocrats".

Beyond the role of hospitality, the queen also needed to replace the role of the iudex when he was away on business for the king. This extended to ruling on punishment of criminal activity or insubordination on the estate. The text specifies that, in the case of an order by the iudex or those above him not being carried out by his subordinates, the queen had the power to determine a penalty.

== Controversy ==
The reasons for the creation of the Capitulare de villis are still being debated centuries after its authorship. Some studies of the document have attempted to use particular words and phrases to tie the text to a particular region or person. One study from 1912 attempted to argue that the document was written by Louis the Pious "during his programme of estate reform in Aquitaine in 794, based in particular on its mention of certain plants that grew only in the milder climate of southern France". Another proposed that, due to Charlemagne's tradition of taking action in the form of pen on paper in response to concrete situations, the text might have been created in response to the famine of 792-3. Other reasons that have been put forward for the creation of the Capitulare de villis include an attempt to "improve administration in the kingdom and to end the abuses of the royal treasury and of the king's residences throughout his vast realm" or, conversely, to provide a supply of provisions for the Carolingian army. No single answer has gained the full support of the academic world.
