= Bodo (deacon) =

Historical European noble

Bodo (c. 814 – 876) was a Frankish deacon at the court of Emperor Louis the Pious, who caused a notorious case of apostasy in the Europe of his day.

== Life ==
In early 838, Bodo declared that he was embarking to make a pilgrimage to Rome, but instead went to Muslim Spain, where he converted to Judaism. His conversion was regarded as a rejection of the Carolingian culture, as well as of the Christian faith. He took the Jewish name of Eleazar, had himself circumcised and married a Jewish woman. In 839, Bodo moved to Saragossa, where he incited the government of the Caliphate of Cordoba and the people to persecute the Spanish Christians. Léon Poliakov claims that this conversion is evidence of the high regard in which Jews were held in Carolingian France.

== Correspondence with Álvaro ==
In 840 Bodo began a correspondence with a Christian intellectual, Pablo Álvaro of Cordova, also in Muslim Spain. Alvaro was born in a Christian family, but with Jewish roots. Because Bodo and Alvaro shared an interest in Judaism, they began a dialogue to try to convince each other to change their faith. Some of their letters have been preserved.

The source of the following letter is disputed, but it is attributed to Bodo:

As for your assertion that Christ is God, joined with the Holy Spirit, and you worship him because he had no human father, then along with him you ought to worship Adam the father of the human race, who had neither father nor mother, whose flesh, blood, bones and skin were created from clay. Breath was put in him by the Holy Spirit, and he became an intelligent being. Then too, Eve was created from Adam's rib without a father or mother, and breath came into her and she became intelligent. So worship them too!

== See also ==
- Pablo Álvaro
- La Convivencia
- Golden age of Jewish culture in Spain
