= Wandalbert of Prüm =

Benedictine monk and poet

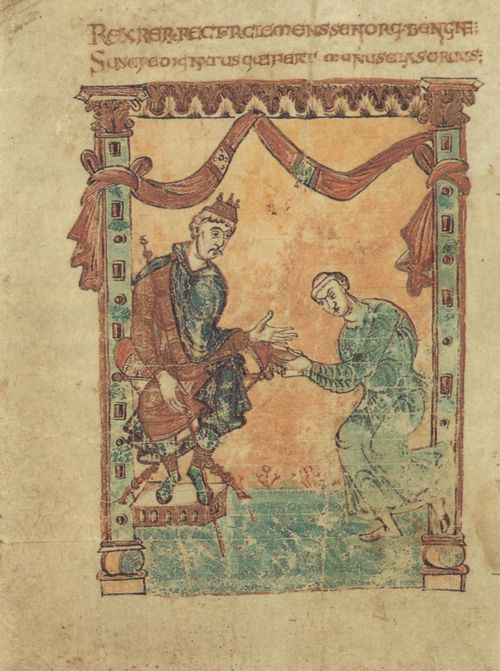
Wandalbert of Prüm presents his martyrology to a king, presumably Louis the German. Depiction from a 9th-century manuscript

Wandalbert of Prüm (813 – died after 850), also known as Wandalbertus Prumiensis, was a Benedictine monk, distinguished poet, and theological writer.

Little is known of his personal history. He was apparently a native of Francia, born around 813.

In 839 he was already a monk at the Abbey of Prüm, where he was head of the school. About this date Abbot Markward commissioned him to rewrite the old Life of St. Goar and to supplement it by an account of the miracles worked by the saint. It originated in the desire to perpetuate the fame of St. Goar, whose cell on the Rhine was given to the monastery of Prüm by King Pepin. The life Wandalbert wrote is not without historical value.

He composed his second work, a martyrology in verse that was finished about 848, at the request of Otrich, a priest of Cologne, and with the aid of his friend Florus of Lyon. The martyrology is based on earlier ones, particularly that of the Venerable Bede. The arrangement follows the calendar, and a brief account is given for each day of the life and death of one or more saints. Together with the martyrology are poems on the months and their signs, on the various kinds of agricultural labour, the seasons for hunting, fishing, cultivation of fruit, of the fields, and of vineyards, and the church Hours. The poetry is, in general, uniform and monotonous, the most graceful passages are various descriptions of nature.

Wandalbert also wrote a (lost) work on the Mass.

== Sources ==
- Heinz Erich Stienen (1981), Wandalbert von Prüm. Vita et Miracula sancti Goaris
