= Zhou Bao =

Zhou Bao (周寶) (814 – February 12, 888), courtesy name Shanggui (上珪), formally the Prince of Ru'nan (汝南王), was a general of the Chinese Tang dynasty who, for eight years, controlled Zhenhai Circuit (鎮海, headquartered in modern Zhenjiang, Jiangsu) as its military governor (jiedushi).

== Background and early career ==
Zhou Bao was born in 814, during the reign of Emperor Xianzong. His family was originally from Ping Prefecture (平州, in modern Qinhuangdao, Hebei). His great-grandfather Zhou Daixuan (周待選) had served as the magistrate of Lucheng County (魯城, in modern Cangzhou, Hebei) during An Lushan's rebellion, and had tried to resist the advances of An's army but was defeated and killed. Zhou Bao's grandfather Zhou Guangji (周光濟) subsequently served under Hou Xiyi (侯希逸) the military governor of Pinglu Circuit (平盧, then-headquartered in modern Chaoyang, Liaoning), a Tang general in the subsequent wars between Tang and An's Yan state. It was said that because of Zhou Daixuan's death, Zhou Guangji wanted revenge, and so whenever he captured those who participated in the Yan siege of Lucheng, he would kill them with his own hands. Subsequently, he served under Hou's successor Li Zhengji, who was de facto independent in his rule of Pinglu (which had then moved south to be headquartered in modern Tai'an, Shandong). After Li Zhengji's death, Zhou Guangji followed Li Zhengji's cousin Li Wei (李洧) in submitting Xu Prefecture (徐州, in modern Xuzhou, Jiangsu) to the imperial government. Zhou Bao's father Zhou Huaiyi (周懷義) later also served as a general, eventually being promoted to being the defender of the western part of Tiande (天德, in modern Bayan Nur, Inner Mongolia), but was said to have died in distress when the chancellor Li Jifu refused to support his proposal to move Tiande's location.

Because of his family's history of service to the imperial government, Zhou Bao became an imperial guard. When Yin Wei (殷洧), who had previously served on Zhou Huaiyi's staff, became the military governor of Tianping Circuit (天平, headquartered in modern Tai'an — having been carved out of Pinglu Circuit previously), he invited Zhou Bao to serve under him. During the Huichang era (841–847) of Emperor Xianzong's grandson Emperor Wuzong, Zhou returned to the capital Chang'an and was made an officer at the Right Shence Army (右神策軍). There, he became a close friend to fellow Right Shence Army officer Gao Pian, such that Gao, who was younger, treated Zhou like an older brother. At one point, he became the defender of Liangyuan Base (良原鎮, in modern Pingliang, Gansu), and, as he was good at polo, had the soldiers play polo as part of their training. Subsequently, as he was not being promoted, he met with Emperor Wuzong, who also liked polo, and offered to be a polo player in Emperor Wuzong's palace. Emperor Wuzong agreed, but it was during this time that, during a polo accident, Zhou lost one eye. He subsequently was made the military governor of Jingyuan Circuit (涇原, headquartered in modern Pingliang). It was said that he shored up Jingyuan's defenses and stored food supplies, and was known as a good general.

== Control of Zhenhai Circuit ==
In winter 879, Zhou Bao was made the military governor of Zhenhai Circuit, succeeding Gao Pian, who was transferred to neighboring Huainan Circuit (淮南, headquartered in modern Yangzhou, Jiangsu). Initially, the relationship between Zhou and Gao were friendly; Gao, who at that point also carried the title of director of salt and iron monopolies, invited Zhou's son Zhou Ji (周佶) to serve as an assistant, while Zhou Bao invited a nephew of Gao's to serve on his staff. However, despite the fact that they were treating each other's as brothers previously when they were at Right Shence Army, Gao, who by that point had become a far more famous general than Zhou, began to take Zhou lightly, and by this point, with their circuits neighboring each other, they began to have disputes. By 881, when Chang'an had fallen to the major agrarian rebel Huang Chao, forcing then-reigning Emperor Xizong (Emperor Wuzong's uncle Emperor Xuānzong's grandson) to flee to Chengdu. Gao claimed that he was preparing a major operation to attack Huang to recapture Chang'an, and he, as the commander of Tang troops in the region, ordered Zhou to mobilize his troops to prepare for the operation. Zhou did so, but then discovered that Gao was making no real plans to launch his troops, and therefore believed that Gao was planning to attack him. When Gao summoned him for a meeting, Zhou refused to go, and after they sent insults back and forth, the friendship was completely broken. Gao subsequently used his rivalry with Zhou and Liu Hanhong the governor of Zhedong Circuit (浙東, headquartered in modern Shaoxing, Zhejiang) as an excuse not to launch his troops to aid the imperial government.

Meanwhile, with Zhenhai Circuit itself being attacked by agrarian rebels, and towns falling to them, Zhou organized eight special corps to defend against the agrarian rebels. In 881, however, one of the eight commanders, Dong Chang, took the opportunity when the new imperially-commissioned prefect of Hang Prefecture (杭州, in modern Hangzhou, Zhejiang), Lu Shenzhong (路審中), was set to arrive there, to seize it before Lu arrived. Dong requested official sanction from Zhou, and as Zhou did not feel he had the power to stop Dong, he commissioned Dong as the prefect of Hang Prefecture. Later in the year, Emperor Xizong gave Zhou the honorary chancellor title of Tong Zhongshu Menxia Pingzhangshi (同中書門下平章事). Zhou was also made the deputy director of salt and iron monopolies, and created the Prince of Ru'nan. As he had ambitions of eventually heading for the imperial government's aid, he organized a new corps, known as the Rear Tower Corps (後樓都), paying them twice the salary of regular troops. (This caused great resentment from the regular troops.) Zhou put his son Zhou Yu (周璵) in command of the Rear Tower Corps, but it was said that Zhou Yu was not an effective commander, and the Rear Tower Corps became arrogant and lacking in discipline. Zhou Bao himself was said to be beginning to spend his time in feast and pleasure, and not paying attention to his troops' needs. He made his son-in-law Yang Maoshi (楊茂實) the prefect of Su Prefecture (蘇州, in modern Suzhou, Jiangsu), and it was said that Yang tried to collect large amounts of taxes from the people, overburdening them. The powerful eunuch Tian Lingzi, who then controlled Emperor Xizong's court, sent the official Zhao Zai (趙載) to replace Yang. Zhou made repeated attempts to petition for Yang's retention, but the petitions were not accepted, so he had Yang vandalize the government offices before leaving.

However, the continued breakdown of Zhou's actual control over the prefectures consisting of Zhenhai Circuit continued. In 886, Zhou's officer Zhang Yu (張郁), who had initially gained Zhou's favor as he was also a polo player, mutinied and captured Chang Prefecture (常州, in modern Changzhou, Jiangsu), but later in the year Zhou was able to send another officer, Ding Congshi (丁從實), to defeat Zhang and recapture Chang Prefecture. Also around this time, another officer, Chen Sheng (陳晟), seized control of Mu Prefecture (睦州, in modern Hangzhou). Also in 886, Dong's subordinate Qian Liu defeated Liu Hanhong, and Dong took over Zhedong Circuit. Dong gave the control of Hang Prefecture to Qian, which Zhou approved. At that time, Tian's associate Shen Gao (沈誥) was surveying the region and, relying on his association with Tian, was engaging in many corrupt acts. When Emperor Xizong's cousin Li Yun the Prince of Xiang briefly seized the throne (although both he and his main support Zhu Mei the military governor of Jingnan Circuit (靜難, headquartered in modern Xianyang, Shaanxi) were killed later in 886, allowing Emperor Xizong to again be undisputed emperor) and ordered a general arrest of Tian's associates, Zhou took this opportunity to arrest and execute Shen and Zhao Zai.

== Downfall and death ==
By 887, Zhou Bao was said to be devoting his time to pleasure, not paying attention to governance. He was also conscripting the laborers to build outer walls for the circuit capital Run Prefecture (潤州), as well as an eastern addition to his mansion. The people resented the heavy labor. Once, when Zhou was feasting with his staff, staff members expressed to him their concerns about the regular troops' resentment of the Rear Tower Corps. Zhou responded, "If they dare to create disturbances, execute them." When his staff member Xue Lang informed this to Xue's friend, the officer Liu Hao (劉浩) to warn Liu, Liu stated, "We can only escape death if we mutiny." That night, Liu started a mutiny with his soldiers and attacked Zhou's mansion. Zhou woke up and tried to summon the Rear Tower Corps to fight the mutineers, but soon found out that the Rear Tower Corps had joined the mutineers. He could not think of another way to counter the mutiny, so he took his family members and fled on foot to Chang Prefecture to join Ding Congshi. Liu killed many of Zhou's staff members, took over the headquarters, and supported Xue as the acting military governor. Because Zhou was previously the deputy director of the monopolies, he had much wealth stored away, and it all fell into the mutineers' hands. When Gao Pian heard of Zhou's fall, he celebrated it, and sent a bag of powder to Zhou to satirize the collapse of his power. Zhou angrily threw the bag onto the ground and stated, "It is hard to say what will happen to you given that you have Lü Yongzhi!" (Lü was a sorcerer whom Gao trusted, who had by this point had great control on Gao's governance of Huainan. Eventually, as a result of Lü's corruption, the officer Bi Shiduo would mutiny, resulting in Gao's own death later in 887.)

In winter 887, Qian Liu sent his officer Du Leng (杜稜) to attack Chang Prefecture, and Ding fled to Hailing (海陵, in modern Taizhou, Jiangsu). Qian had Zhou escorted to Hang Prefecture, where he welcomed Zhou in a grand ceremony fitting the ceremony welcome by a subordinate of a military governor. Zhou would die at Hang Prefecture early in 888. The New Book of Tang indicated that Qian killed Zhou, but Sima Guang, the lead author of the Zizhi Tongjian, found the account not credible and did not adopt it. When Qian captured Run Prefecture and arrested Xue, he had Xue's heart cut out of his body and sacrificed to Zhou.

== Notes and references ==
- New Book of Tang, vol. 186.
- Zizhi Tongjian, vols. 253, 254, 255, 256, 257.
