= Abd-Allah ibn Numayr =

Muslim scholar of Islam (died 814)

- Died: 199 AH/814CE

Philosophical work
- Era: Medieval era

Abd-Allah ibn Numayr (died 199 AH/814) was a narrator of hadith.

== Name ==
His full name was al-Hafiz Muhammad Abdallah ibn Numayr al-Hamdani.

== Legacy ==
He has been quoted in Sahih Muslim and by Maxime Rodinson.

=== Sunni view ===
Ibn Hajar Asqalani is quoted in Tahdhib al-Tahdhib that Abd-Allah ibn Numayr has been considered veracious (Arabic: thiqah) by Yahya ibn Ma'in, al-Ijli and Ibn Sa'd.

== See also ==
- List of Islamic scholars
