= Meng Jiao =

Chinese poet

Chinese name
- Chinese: 孟郊
Transcriptions
Standard Mandarin
- Hanyu Pinyin: Mèng Jiāo
- Wade–Giles: Meng^{4} Chiao^{1}
- IPA: [mə̂ŋ tɕjáʊ]
Yue: Cantonese
- Jyutping: Maang^{6} Gaau^{1}
Middle Chinese
- Middle Chinese: Mɐng^{C} Kau

Japanese name
- Kanji: 孟郊
- Hiragana: もうこう
Transcriptions
- Romanization: Mō Kō

Meng Jiao (751–814) was a Chinese poet during the Tang dynasty. Two of his poems have been collected in the popular anthology Three Hundred Tang Poems. Meng was the oldest of the Mid-Tang poets and is noted for the unusual forcefulness and harshness of his poems.

== Names ==
Meng Jiao's courtesy name was Dongye (traditional Chinese: 東野; simplified Chinese: 东野; pinyin: Dōngyě).

== Biography ==
Meng Jiao was born into difficult times. His pursuit of poetry and reluctance until late in life to write and pass the imperial examinations (which if taken earlier in life might have eventually led to a well-paid political career) resulted in his living a life in which necessities were scarce. Nevertheless, his commitment to poetry resulted in him becoming an influential leader in terms of poetic innovation.

=== Birth ===
Meng Jiao was born in 751. He was from what is now Deqing County in the province of Zhejiang, in China; but, at that time was Wukang (Chinese: 武康; pinyin: Wǔkāng), in the Tang Chinese province Huzhou. The year he was born was also the year in which the Tang dynasty's military expansionism began to reach its limits, with major military defeats both versus the Abbasid Caliphate in Central Asia in the Battle of Talas and versus the Kingdom of Nanzhao in Southeast Asia, (near modern Xiaguan, by Erhai Lake). Both battles resulted in major losses to the Tang both in terms of troop strength and prestige. Shortly after Meng Jiao's birth, towards the end of 755, An Lushan launched a rebellion against the central government of Tang. Meng Jiao grew up during a time of military and economic disturbances as a result of this rebellion, which was known initially as the An Lushan Rebellion, but subsequently resulted in continuous disturbances to the political economy and basic safety of the citizenry which the central authority of Tang was unable to control.

=== Life in the South ===
Meng Jiao spent many years as a recluse and a poet in Southern China, associating himself with the Zen Buddhist poet-monks of the region. Eventually, at forty years of age, his wandering ways led to his settling in the area of the major metropolis of Luoyang, as an impoverished and unemployed poet.

=== Luoyang ===
At the time of Meng Jiao's moving there, despite the period of disturbance, Luoyang was still one of the world's most populous and cosmopolitan cities, and a central nexus of social and cultural life in Tang China. In Luoyang, Meng Jiao found inclusion in a poetic circle including Han Yu, Jia Dao, Zhang Ji, and Li He.

=== Imperial Examinations ===
It has been said that, as a result of an unwillingness to write even the first stage of the examination system, Meng Jiao was doomed to a life of poverty and adversity. At the urging of his mother (according to Han Yu), Meng eventually did pass the jinshi examination, but not until the age of forty six sui (Zhenyuan 12). Meng Jiao was part of the literary circle centering on Han Yu and Jang Ji. Meng actually has a poem amongst his collected works entitled "After Passing the Examination". Fan Ju-lin in T'ang Teng K'o Chi states that Meng was 46 when he passed the Chin-shih, in the 12th year of the Chen Yuan period (796). His poverty was not substantially alleviated by his passing the imperial examinations. He was ultimately appointed to an entry-level position in the imperial bureaucracy; however, as noted by Ou-yang Hsiu in the Hsin T'ang Shu (SPTK. po-na edition): " At the age of fifty he passed the chin-shih examination and was appointed to the position of Wei at Li Yang. In the Prefecture, there was the T'ou Lai Chin Lake….. [and] there was place where the trees grew densely offering cover and shade. Below this was the lake. Chiao spent his time sitting down by the water and pacing back and forth writing poetry. He neglected his official duties. The District Magistrate reported this to the Prefect, and so they hired an acting Wei to substitute for him, and they divided his salary in half".

=== Death ===
Meng Jiao died in 814.

After his death, Han Yu wrote an epitaph on his life and work. A rough translation is:

"On the cyclic day Chi-hai of the eighth month in the ninth year of the Yuan-ho period of the T'ang Dynasty, Master Chen Yao, Meng by surname died. He had no sons. His wife, a woman of the Cheng family, informed me. I went out and stood weeping, and then I summoned Chang Chi to mourn with me. The next day I sent a messenger to the eastern capital with money to contribute to the burial expenses. All those who had formerly associated with him came together to send condolences. Then, by mail, I informed the former Minister, now Governor of Hsing -yuan, Yu-ch'ing. During the inter-calary month, Fan Tsung-shih sent his condolences. We told him the burial date and he asked me to write the inscription. I wept, saying, "Oh can I still bear to write my friends epitaph?" The governor of Hsing Yuan sent money to the Meng family to contribute to the funeral expenses and moreover came to discuss family affairs. Fan's envoy asked that the epitaph be speedily done, saying,"If it is not done there will be nothing to protect him from the darkness". So I wrote this preface and this epitaph. The master's taboo name was Chiao (Jiao), and his courtesy name was Tung-yeh. His father, T'ing-fen married a woman of the P'ei family and was selected for appointment of Wei (an entry level official position) at K'un Shan. His father had two more sons, Meng's younger brothers, Feng and Ying, before he died. When Meng was six or seven years old, the beginnings of his character could be seen. When he grew up his spirit was exceedingly lofty but he softened it and made his outer and inner-self excellent and amiable. His appearance was serene and his spirit was pure. He was capable of both respect and friendship. As for his poetry, it pierces one's eye and impales one's heart. It cuts to the point like a thread parting at the touch of a knife. His barbed words and thorny sentences tear at one's guts. His ability at writing is like a spirit's or a ghost's which is glimpsed in between over and over again. He cared only for writing and didn't care what the world thought. Some people said to him that he must explain his poetry or it would not be understandable to later generations. Chiao replied, "I have already put it out there and given it to them. Surely this is enough. Before he was fifty, he began because of his mother's influence, to come to the capital to take the chin-shih examination. When he passed he left. Four years later he was ordered to come to be selected and was appointed the Wei of Li yang. He invited his mother to come to Li Yang. Two years after leaving his position as Wei, the former Minister Cheng, who was the Governor of Ho-nan, memorialized that Meng be made officer in charge of transportation. He was made the provisional officer in charge of land and water transportation.. Cheng Yu-ch'ing personally paid his respects to Chiao's mother inside the door. Five years after she died, Cheng, who was then the Governor of Hsing-yuan, memorialized that Meng be appointed an advisor with the title Ta Li Ping-shih. When Meng was bringing his wife and her family to Hsing yuan, they stopped over at Wen Hsiang. Here, Meng suddenly took ill and died. He was sixty-four. They bought a coffin for the body and he was returned to his home in a carriage. Feng and Ying were both in Chiang-nan. On the day of Keng-shen, in the tenth month, Fan presented all the gifts and contributions for the funeral. They buried him to the east of Loyang and to the left of his ancestors tombs. The extra money was given to his family to carry out the sacrifices. As they were about to bury him, Chang Chi said, "He lifted up virtue and shook splendour that shone even unto the ancients. There is a precedent for those who are virtuous to change their name. How much more so is there for this man? If I call him Chen Yao then his name will be a record of his nature and no one will need an explanation of his character". All agreed to it and so they used it. One who had studied with him, his uncle Meng Chien, (who had been transferred from the Censorate to become Inspector of Che-Tung) said, "In life I was not able to promote him. In death I know how to be in sympathy with his family". The inscription read: "Alas, Chen Yao, he was constant and steadfast and could not be swayed. All that he had to offer the world couldn't be measured but he did not have a chance to show it. Dying he had nothing to leave but the brilliance of his poetry"

== Poetry ==
His poetry is generally written in the five-character per line gushi style (which can also be considered to be a type of "folk-song-styled-verse", or yuefu, as in the Three Hundred Tang Poems). Around 500 of his poems survive, many upon the themes of poverty and cold, and typified by the strong—and sometimes shocking—imagery advocated by Han Yu. Two of his poems are included in the Three Hundred Tang Poems. One of which, "遊子吟"—translated by Witter Bynner as "A Traveller's Song", by A. C. Graham as "Wanderer's Song", and by John C. H. Wu as "The Song of a Wandering Son"—is one of the most famous Classical Chinese poems.

David Hinton has recently shown an interest in translating some of Meng's poems (about 53) of which some 500 odd are extant. His book is entitled "The Late Poems of Meng Chiao" published by Princeton University Press 1996. Su Dongpo a noted Song dynasty scholar and poet did not think much of Meng's poetry. He wrote a mocking poem:

 At night I am reading Meng Jiao's poetry.
 His small words are like ox-hairs.
 A cold lamp casts a dim light.
 Occasionally you come across a good line,
 At first it's like eating a tiny fish,
 What you get out of it isn't worth the trouble.
 Sometimes it's like cooking a crab,
 After all that time, all there is to chew on are empty claws.
 Why should you let your two ears suffer,
 Having to listen to this cold cicada's cry.
 The best thing to do is get rid of it,
 And drink some of my sweet wine.[12]

With Su Dongpo's critique in mind one has to question his assessment when reading the following poem ( one of a set of ten) grouped under the common title "Sorrow in the Gorges":

 Above the gorge, one thread of sky,
 In the gorge, ten thousand corded cascades.
 Above, the splintered shards of slanted light,
 Below, the pull of the restless roiling flow.
 Broken souls lie dotted here and there,
 Freezing in the gloom of centuries.
 At noon the sun never settles above the gorge.
 Hungry spittle flies where the gorge is dangerous,
 Trees lock their roots around rotten coffins,
 Rising skeletal and up-right swinging back and forth.
 As the frost perches, the branches of the trees moan,
 Soughing mournfully, far off, yet clear.
 A spurned exile's stripped and scattered guts
 Sizzle and scald where the water boils up.
 Life is like a tortured, twisted thread,
 A road on which we balance, following a single strand.
 Pouring a libation of tears, to console the water spirits,
 They shimmer and flash an instant upon the waves.[13]

== Studies ==
Prior to the 1975 publication of Stephen Owen's The Poetry of Meng Chiao and Han Yü by Yale University Press, there had been no studies of Meng Jiao in English.

== See also ==
- Classical Chinese poetry
- Han Yu
- Jia Dao
- Li He
- Tang poetry

== Works cited ==
- Graham, A. C. (1977). Poems of the Late T'ang. New York: The New York Review of Books. ISBN 978-1-59017-257-5
- Hinton, David (2008). Classical Chinese Poetry: An Anthology. New York: Farrar, Straus, and Giroux. ISBN 0374105367 / ISBN 9780374105365.
- Leung, K.C. (San Jose State University). "The Poetry of Meng Chiao and Han Yü" (book review). Books Abroad, ISSN 0006-7431, 07/1976, Volume 50, Issue 3, pp. 715
- Owen, Stephen (1996). An Anthology of Chinese Literature: Beginnings to 1911. New York, London: W.W. Norton.
- Ueki, Hisayuki; Uno, Naoto; Matsubara, Akira (1999). "Shijin to Shi no Shōgai (Mō Kō)". In Matsuura, Tomohisa (ed.). Kanshi no Jiten 漢詩の事典 (in Japanese). Tokyo: Taishūkan Shoten. p. 110. OCLC 41025662.
- Wu, John C. H. (1972). The Four Seasons of Tang Poetry. Rutland, Vermont: Charles E. Tuttle. ISBN 978-0-8048-0197-3
