= Carolingian schools =

8th and 9th-century educational programs

Carolingian schools comprised a small number of educational institutions which had a major share in the Carolingian Renaissance, specifically cathedral schools and monastic schools.

== Precursors ==
Under the Merovingian Kings of the Frankish kingdoms, a 'palatial' school -- scola palatina was established at the court. The chroniclers of the eighth century styled it—for the training of the young Frankish nobles in the art of war and in the ceremonies of the court.

With the accession of the future emperor Charlemagne (768) a scheme of educational reform was inaugurated, first in the palace school itself, and later in the various schools established or reformed by imperial decrees throughout the vast empire over which Charlemagne reigned. The reform of the palace school, i.e. the change from a school of military tactics and court manners to a place of learning, was begun in 780, as soon as the victories over the Lombards, Saxons and Saracens (in Iberia) afforded.

== Beginning at the court ==
It was not until the arrival of Alcuin at his court seat Aachen in 782 that the work of educational reform began to prove any success. Alcuin was not made head of the emperor's school in the palace, but was admitted to the council of the emperor in all educational matters and became Charlemagne's "prime minister of education". Charlemagne also built new monasteries and encouraged the learning of Latin. He represented the learning of the school of York, which united in its traditions the current of educational reform inaugurated in the South of England by Theodore of Tarsus and that other current which, starting from the schools of Ireland, spread over the entire northern part of England. He was not an original thinker, but he exerted a profound cultural influence on the whole Frankish Kingdom by reason of the high esteem in which Charlemagne and his courtiers held him. He taught grammar, rhetoric, dialectic and the elements of geometry, astronomy and music (see Seven Liberal Arts), and his success as a teacher of these branches seems to have been generally acknowledged by all the courtiers as well as by his royal patron. Einhard's biography of Charlemagne mentions that the emperor, the princes and princesses and all the royal household formed a kind of higher school at the palace in order to learn these fundamentals from Alcuin.

== Further ambition ==
Charlemagne was not content with securing the services of the best teacher of that age for his palace school. Acting under Alcuin's advice he proceeded by a series of enactments dating from 787 (two years after the final triumph over the Saxons) to 789, to inaugurate a reform in the educational conditions throughout the empire.

In 787 he issued the famous capitulary which has been styled the "Charter of Modern Thought", addressing himself to the bishops and abbots of the empire, informing them that he "has judged it to be of utility that, in their bishoprics and monasteries committed by Christ's favour to his charge, care should be taken that there should not only be a regular manner of life, but also the study of letters, each to teach and learn them according to his ability and the Divine assistance". He has observed, he says, in the letters which, during past years, he has received from different monasteries, that though the thoughts contained therein are most just, the language in which those thoughts are expressed is often uncouth, and the fear arises in his mind lest if the skill to write correctly were thus lacking, the power of rightly comprehending the Scriptures might be less than it should be. "Let there, therefore, be chosen [for the work of teaching] men who are both willing and able to learn and let them apply themselves to this work with a zeal equal to the earnestness with which we recommend it to them". Copies of this letter were to be sent to all suffragan bishops and to all (dependent) monasteries, in order to introduce the reform of education into all the cathedral schools and monastic schools of the empire.

In the major Council of Aachen of 789, Charlemagne issued more explicit instructions regarding the education of the clergy. He also wrote, in the capitulary of 789, "Let every monastery and every abbey have its school, in which boys may be taught the Psalms, the system of musical notation, singing, arithmetic and grammar".

Theodulf, Bishop of Orléans, succeeded Alcuin as adviser of the emperor in educational matters at the court in 796. A 797 enactment by Theodulf orders "that the priests establish schools in every town and village, and if any of the faithful wish to entrust their children to them to learn letters, that they refuse not to accept them but with all charity teach them ... and let them exact no price from the children for their teaching nor receive anything from them save what parents may offer voluntarily and from affection" (P.L., CV., col. 196).

== Actual spreading ==
The "new learning" inaugurated at the palace school (which seems to have followed the court from place to place rather than being in a fixed place) quickly spread throughout the empire. Its first noticeable success was at Fulda, which since the days of its first abbot, Sturm, had maintained a tradition of fidelity to the ideals of St. Benedict. The man to whom the success of the schools of Fulda was largely due was Rhabanus Maurus. While still a young monk at Fulda, Rhabanus, learning of the fame of Alcuin, begged to be sent to Tours, where he listened a year to the aged teacher and imbibed some of his zeal for the study of the classics and the cultivation of the sciences. On his return to Fulda he was placed at the head of the monastic school and, amid many difficulties, continued to labour for the intellectual reform of his own monastery and his own land. His Abbot, Ratgar, believing that the monks were better employed in building churches than in studying their lessons, closed the school of the monastery and confiscated the teacher's note-books. On this incident, Rhabanus wrote, "He alone escapes calumny who writes nothing at all." He was not discouraged though, and the day came when, as Abbot of Fulda, he could give full authority to his measures for educational reform.

Later, as Archbishop of Mainz, Rhabanus continued to sustain the programme of the Carolingian revival, and by his efforts for the improvement of popular preaching, and by his advocacy of the use of the vernacular tongue, earned the title of the "Teacher of Germany". His influence may be traced beyond the territory which belonged to the monastery of Fulda; to him and to his educational activity is due the revival of learning in the schools of Solenhofen, Celle, Hirsfeld, Petersburg and Hirschau, and even Reichenau and St. Gall.

In France, the Carolingian revival was taken up by Theodulf, Bishop of Orléans. Alcuin himself, after his retirement to the monastery of Tours, devoted his attention almost exclusively to monastic education and the transcription of liturgical and theological works. Whatever love he had for the classics changed towards the end of his life into a suspicion of all "pagan literature." In this he offers a striking contrast, with Lupus Servatus, a disciple of Rhabanus, who, as Abbot of Ferrières, early in the ninth century and by that ahead of his time, encouraged and promoted the study of the pagan classics. Through the influence of Alcuin, Theodulf, Lupus and others, the Carolingian revival spread to Reims, Auxerre, Laon and Chartres, where the foundations of scholastic theology and philosophy were already laid.

In Southern Germany and Switzerland the Carolingian revival was felt before the close of the eighth century in Rheinau, Reichenau and St. Gallen, and early in the following century in Northern Italy, especially in Pavia and Bobbio. Under the successors of Charlemagne there sprang up the schools of Utrecht, Liège, and St. Laurent (Note: According to the history website Learning and Knowledge in the Carolingian Times, although records show that a school existed at a place called St-Laurent, no other information about its location is available.) in the Low Countries which continued the movement.

== The Irish teachers ==
Various Irish teachers, competitors of Alcuin, were also associated with the early spread of the movement. According to the St. Gall chronicler who wrote the Life of Charlemagne dedicated to Charles the Fat (d. 888), two Irish monks arrived in France before Alcuin had received Charlemagne's invitation. Having set out their stall in the marketplace to somewhat boastfully teach wisdom, they were received by the emperor with honour, and one of them placed at the head of the palace school. The story, however, is not accepted as entirely reliable.

After Alcuin left the court of Charlemagne, one of these monks Clement the Irishman (Clemens Scotus) succeeded him as master of the palace school, and that he had pupils sent to him even from the monastery of Fulda. The grammarian Cruindmelus, the poet Dungal of Bobbio and Bishop Donatus of Fiesole were among the many Irish teachers on the Continent who enjoyed the favour of Charlemagne. The anonymous Hibernicus exul also wrote at his court. Indeed, the emperor, according to Einhard, "loved the strangers" and "had the Irish in special esteem".

His successors likewise invited the Irish teachers to their court. Louis the Pious was the patron of the Irish geographer Dicuil, Lothair II stood in a similar relation to the Irish poet and scribe Sedulius Scottus, founder of the school at Liège, and Charles the Bald equalled his grandfather in his affectionate esteem for the Irish teachers. Under him Elias taught at Laon, Dunchad at Reims, Israel at Auxerre, and the greatest of all the Irish scholars, Johannes Scotus Eriugena, was head of the palace school. Other Irish scholars taught at Reichenau, St. Gall and Bobbio. To the curriculum already in vogue in the Carolingian Schools the Irish teachers added the study of Greek, and wherever they taught philosophy or theology (dialectic and the interpretation of the Scriptures) they drew largely from the writings of the neo-Platonists and from the works of the Greek Fathers.

== School resources ==
The course of studies in the town and village schools (per villas et viccos) comprised at least the elements of Christian Doctrine, plainsong, the rudiments of grammar, and perhaps, where the influence of St. Benedict's rule was still felt, some kind of manual training. Evidence from espiscopal capitularies suggests these external schools were more widespread than previously thought, serving both clerical and lay students in rural areas.

In the monastic and cathedral schools the curriculum included grammar (including general language instruction and poetry), rhetoric, dialectic, geometry, arithmetic, music and astronomy. The text-book in these subjects was, wherever the Irish teaching prevailed, Martianus Capella, "De Nuptiis Mercurii et philologiae"; elsewhere, as in the schools taught by Alcuin, the teacher compiled treatises on grammar, etc. from the works of Cassiodorus, St. Isidore of Seville and Venerable Bede. In some instances the works of Boethius were used as texts in dialectic.

The master, scholasticus or archischolus (earlier capiscola), had at his command, besides his assistants, a proscholus or prefect of discipline, whose duty it was (in the monastic school of Fulda, at least) to teach the children "how to walk, how to bow to strangers, how to behave in the presence of superiors". The teacher read (legere was synonymous with docere) while the pupils took down his dictation in their wax tablets (parchment was too expensive).

Discipline in the Carolingian schools was maintained by the proscholus, and that the medieval scholar dreaded the rod is clear from an episode in the history of the school of St. Gall where, in order to escape a birching, the boys set fire to the monastery. Regulations regarding neatness, the hours to be given to work, and provision for the mid-day siesta etc. show that some attention was paid to the health and comfort of the pupils.

The "school-room" was, until as late as the twelfth century the cloister of the monastery and, in the case of some very popular teachers, the street or a public square. The floor of the schoolroom was strewn with straw on which the pupils sat -boarded floors and benches do not appear to have been in use in schools until the fifteenth century, although seats of a certain kind were provided at Cluny Abbey, in the twelfth century, namely wooden boxes which served both as seat and repository for writing materials.

== Dawn ==
After the death of Charlemagne and the dismemberment of the empire, the educational reforms introduced by him received a setback. There was a brief period under Charles the Bald, when royal favour was once more bestowed on scholars, but this waned again at the beginning of the tenth century. Nevertheless, the monastic and episcopal schools, and no doubt the village schools too, continued wherever war and pillage did not render their existence impossible. Thus the educational influence of the Carolingian revival of learning was continued in some way down to the dawn of the era of university education in the thirteenth century.

== Sources ==
- Info, newadvent.org. Accessed 23 February 2024.
