= Remigius of Auxerre =

Benedictine monk (c.841–908)

Remigius (Remi) of Auxerre (Latin: Remigius Autissiodorensis; c. 841 – 908) was a Benedictine monk during the Carolingian period, a teacher of Latin grammar, and a prolific author of commentaries on classical Greek and Latin texts. He is also accredited with collecting and compiling other early medieval thinkers' commentaries on these works.

== Biography ==
Remigius, likely born in Burgundy, was a disciple of Lupus of Ferrières and Heiric of Auxerre (d. 876), who was himself a disciple of Johannes Scotus Eriugena. He also borrowed heavily in his commentaries from the Irish teacher Dunchad of Reims, Sedulius Scottus, and Martinus Hiberniensis. "Usually, in accordance with Gresham's law of scholarship, Remigius' commentaries ultimately drove from the field those from which he had so generously borrowed," J. P. Elder has remarked. Putting the same phenomenon under a more positive light, John Marenbon asserts that Remigius's extensive 9th century collection of commentaries on classical texts (both his own and those of the authors upon which he drew), preserved for later academics not only the works of other early medieval thinkers, but also certain elements of the ancient Greek and Latin languages and philosophies. Later documentation shows that Remigius's collections were used across Europe in the later Medieval period, especially in the 12th century.

He taught at the monastery of the Abbey of Saint-Germain en Auxerre, becoming the school master after Heiric's death in 876. In 883 he was called to teach at the Cathedral School in Reims by Archbishop Fulk, and made its headmaster in 893. When Fulk died in 900, Remigius left to teach in Paris, where he remained until his own death. By this time he had earned the reputation of "egregius doctor" and "in divinis et humanis scripturis eruditissimus". As a teacher, Remigius interested himself in the problem of universals, and seems to have attempted a compromise between the extreme Realism of Eriugena and the Anti-Realism of his teacher Heiric. In general, he sought to interpret both classical texts and Christian Scripture in a way that could be taught to his students, exploring the ways in which ancient philosophy could be applied to the Christianized world in which they lived. Although the texts he examined were numerous and varied, his main commentaries were on the works of the late Roman philosophers Boethius and Martianus Capella, in which he found flexible allegories that he felt could co-exist with Christian theology.

== Writings ==
During his long academic career, Remigius wrote a number of glossaries and marginal commentaries on a wide variety of texts, both of classical and Christian origin. His glosses, which borrowed freely from earlier scholars, are of very great interest to the student of medieval Latin philology. His commentary on the Bible includes work on the Book of Genesis, and the Book of Psalms (his Ennarationes in Psalmos). He also wrote on the grammar of Priscian, Donatus, Phocas, and Eutyches. His favoured classical texts include works by Terence, Juvenal, and Caelius Sedulius, the Disticha Catonis, and the Ars de nomine, as well as the later commentary of Bede. However, he is best remembered for his contribution to, and collection of, commentaries on the Opuscula Sacra and De Consolatione Philosophiae of Boethius, and the De Nuptiis Philologiae et Mercurii et de septem Artibus liberalibus libri novem, or On the Wedding Day of Philology and Mercury and of the Seven Liberal Arts, in Nine Books, of Martianus Capella. He is also thought to have written a commentary on some of the works of Prudentius, but the attribution is not secure.

Remigius wrote his commentaries mostly for the benefit of his pupils, explaining the meaning and significance of texts in a dispassionate, concise way, placing emphasis on grammatical structures and linguistic peculiarities. Like most scholars of the Carolingian period, he had great respect for philosophy, particularly that of Plato and the Neo-Platonists that followed. He was an avid teacher of the Seven Liberal Arts, with emphasis on music and dialectic, indicating that he, like so many Carolingians, embraced classical virtues. However, he was also a devout Christian, and thus prone to using philosophical texts to clarify and make sense of certain aspects of Christian theology. Thus his commentaries examine the allegories and symbols in the texts in a way that reflects the older philosophies from which they are derived, but in a way that could be applied to the rituals and theology of the Church. His synthesis of Classical and Christian thought was in no way unprecedented, but in compiling the commentaries of other thinkers he perpetuated that early medieval inclination.

== Influence on music ==
During Remigius’s lifetime, music in the domain of the Church was monophonic, which would not change until the 12th and 13th centuries. However, the groundwork for polyphony was laid in his lifetime, with the examination and interpretation of ancient philosophical works. Texts by figures from Plato to Martianus Capella explored the philosophical relationships between mathematics and sound, and later, verse. Early medieval thinkers interpreted these texts in different ways, the grammarians among them (including Remigius of Auxerre), discovering innovative connections between the structures of music and verse. Through the grammatical exegesis of philosophical texts on the mathematics of music, the foundation was laid for polyphonic music, which came to fruition at Notre Dame de Paris some three centuries later.

During the Carolingian period, the Roman Church had difficulty instituting a universal structure of the Mass because the ritual in France included a strong oral and musical tradition not present in that of the Roman Church. Music was then institutionalized by Rome, necessitating the grammarians’ interpretation of ancient philosophical discourses on music.

== Historical context ==
Remigius wrote and taught in the fading light of what has been referred to as the Carolingian Renaissance, which is said to have occurred during the reign of Charlemagne (800–814) also known as Charles I. At this time, Charlemagne’s guidance sparked a new interest in the works and ideas of ancient thinkers, especially in regard to the structure and application of Neo-Platonic philosophy, and Roman education and law (with emphasis on studying the seven liberal arts).

Although Remigius of Auxerre was not directly involved in this cultural revival, he certainly benefited from its influence. His academic position of grammarian hearkens back to the ancient Roman educational model, in which Grammar, Logic, and Rhetoric stood as the three pillars of learning (the Trivium, on which theoretical knowledge is built). More importantly, Remigius’ exposure to ancient Greek and Latin, brought to the West through contact with the Byzantine Empire, gave him the opportunity to understand and comment upon philosophical texts. Finally, the prevailing sentiment of this “Carolingian Renaissance” is clearly present in Remigius’ works, namely, that Platonism and Christianity could co-exist; the former explained the universe, but with the necessary tools of the latter.

== Authorship controversy ==
Initial studies of Remigius’ commentaries concluded that he had drawn extensively from the works of John Scotus Eriugena, who had introduced the French Court and schools to Neo-Platonism a generation before. Remigius was accused by E. K. Rand of applying “scissors and paste” to Eriugena’s work, based on the fact that while Eriugena was a philosopher, Remigius was merely a grammarian. However, more recent scholarship has shown that not only are such condemnations unfair, neither are they entirely true.

Remigius was greatly influenced by Eriugena, and certainly wrote his commentaries with his predecessor’s ideas firmly in mind. In fact, Remigius is known to have written his commentaries on Martianus Capella’s work with the help of two books, one by Eriugena, and the other by Martinus Hiberniensis. However, Remigius’s glosses are likely his own, given that examination of the documents indicates they were written at Auxerre. The problem with claiming that Remigius plagiarized is simply that at that time and in that place, most scholars were quite familiar with Eriugena’s work, and made use of his ideas in their own work with the understanding that his ideas would be easily distinguished from their own. Furthermore, Remigius’s commentary tends to be more concerned with grammatical matters than those of detailed philosophy, despite his belief that philosophy and religion were joint paths to wisdom. It is likely then, that he began with Eriugena’s philosophical base, and added his own interpretation of texts. This seems even more likely when the difficulty of learning ancient Greek is taken into account.

Until the 13th century, no proper book of Greek grammar existed, requiring scholars to apply what they knew of Latin grammar, from reading Donatus, Priscian, and Isidore of Seville, to ancient Greek texts. Eriugena learned enough Greek to write commentary on the texts, and it seems plausible that a grammarian like Remigius would build his understanding of the language based on the work of another. Taking all of this into account, the controversy over Remigius’s supposed plagiarism appears, to modern scholars, to be a matter of early medieval scholastic circumstance rather than intent.

== Sources ==
- Atkinson, Charles M., “Martianus Capella 935 and its Carolingian Commentaries,” Journal of Musicology, Vol. 17, No. 4(1999, 2001), pp. 498–519.
- Burnham, J.M., "Commentaire anonyme sur Prudence." (Paris: Picard et Fils 1910). 300 pages
- Dox, Donnalee, “The Eyes of the Body and the Veil of Faith,” Theatre Journal, Vol. 56, No. 1, (March 2004), pp. 29–45.
- Esposito, M., “A Ninth-Century Commentary on Donatus,” The Classical Quarterly, Vol. 11, No. 2 (April 1917), pp. 94–97.
- Fassler, Margot E., “Accent, Meter, and Rhythm in Medieval Treatises ‘De rithmis,’” The Journal of Musicology, Vol. 5, No. 2, (Spring 1987), pp. 164-190.
- Gibson, Margaret T., “Boethius in the Carolingian Schools,” Transactions of the Royal Historical Society, Fifth Series, Vol. 32, (1982), pp 43–56.
- Kaczynski, Bernice M., Greek in the Carolingian Age: The St. Gall Manuscripts, (Cambridge, Massachusetts: The Medieval Academy of America, 1988), 164 pages.
- Lutz, Cora E., ed. Remigii Autissiodorensis commentum in Martianum Capellam, (Leiden: E.J. Brill, 1962), 219 pages.
- Marenbon, John, Early Medieval Philosophy (480-1150): An Introduction, (London: Routledge with Kegan Paul, 1983), 190 pages.
- Marenbon, John, From the Circle of Alcuin to the School of Auxerre: Logic, Theology, and Philosophy in the Early Middle Ages,(Cambridge: Cambridge University Press, 1981), 219 pages.
- Marenbon, John, Medieval Philosophy: An Historical and Philosophical Introduction, (London: Routledge with the Taylor & Francis Group, 2007), 449 pages.
- Rand, E. K., “How Much of the Annotationes in Marcianum is the Work of John the Scot?,” Transactions and Proceedings of the American Philological Association, Vol. 71, (1940), pp. 501–523.
- Stahl, William H., “To a Better Understanding of Martianus Capella,” Speculum, Vol. 40, No. 1 (Jan. 1965) pp. 102–115.
- Trompf, G. W., “The Concept of the Carolingian Renaissance,” Journal of the History of Ideas, Vol. 34, No. 1 (Jan-March 1973), pp. 3–26.
- Van Doren, Charles, A History of Knowledge: The Pivotal Events, People, and Achievements of World History, (New York: Ballantine Books, 1991), 422 pages.
- Wright, Craig, Music and Ceremony at Notre Dame of Paris: 500-1550, (Cambridge: Cambridge University Press, 1989), 400 pages.
