= Wilhering College =

Coordinates: 48.3239°N 14.1902°E

Wilhering College Stiftsgymnasium Wilhering

Location
- Wilhering, Upper-Austria, Austria

Information
- School type: Independent grammar school
- Established: 1895
- Founder: Abbot Theobald Grasböck
- Age range: 10-18
- Enrolment: ca. 500 students

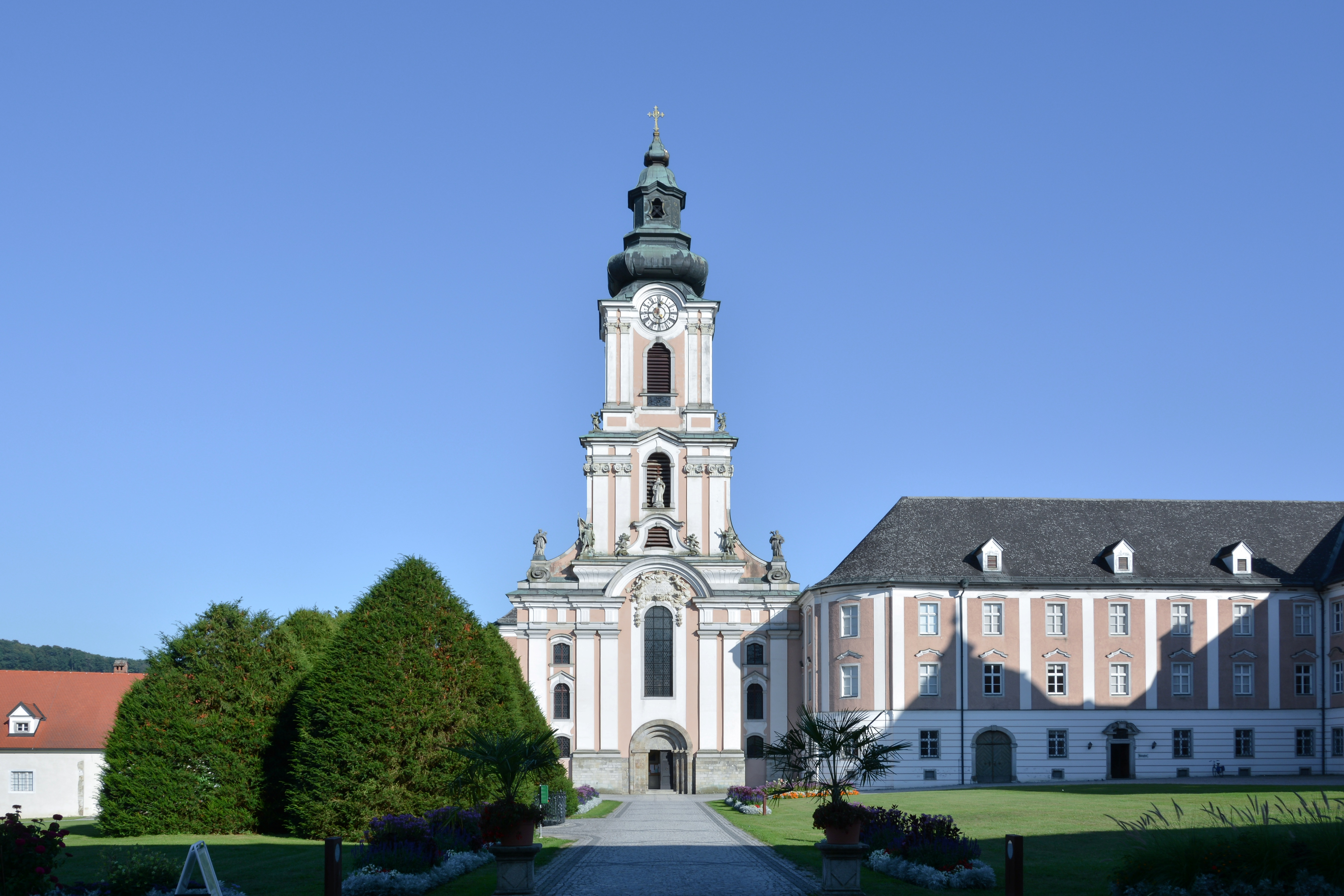
The schoolyard with the remarkable rococo church of Wilhering Abbey

Wilhering College is an Austrian private grammar school, situated in Wilhering, Upper Austria. It was founded in 1895 and is operated by the Cistercian monastery of Wilhering Abbey. Its roots as a monastic school go back to the 16th century.

== History ==
The school was founded in 1895 by Abbot Theobald Grasböck as an all-boys boarding school following the typical Cistercian tradition of monastic schools in Wilhering that can be traced back to the year 1580. In 1904 it was acknowledged by the Imperial-Royal Ministry of Culture and Education as private school under public law. Being home for several intellectuals resisting Nazism, the school was closed after the German Annexation of Austria in 1938 but reopened immediately after the World War II in 1945.

In 1980 Wilhering College first admitted girls to lessons and is now fully coeducational. The boarding home was closed in 1990.

== Old Hilarians ==
Former pupils of Wilhering College are known as Altwilheringer or Althilarier (engl. Old Hilarians, from the latin name of Wilhering hilaria). From 1923 to 1938 and from 1968 to 2003 some of them were organised in the student fraternity Hilaria which was founded under the patronage of Abbot Gabriel Fazeny.

Notable pupils and alumni of Wilhering College include Theoderich Hofstätter (1906–1981, Cistercian and member of the Austrian Resistance), Balduin Sulzer (*1932, Austrian composer), Beppo Mauhart (*1933, Austrian manager), Peter Huemer (*1941, Austrian journalist), Wolfgang Holzmair (*1952, Austrian baritone) and Walter Gugerbauer (*1955, Austrian conductor and chief musical director of Erfurt Theatre).
