= Heiric of Auxerre =

French Benedictine theologian

Heiric of Auxerre (841–876) was a French Benedictine theologian and writer. An oblate of the abbey of Saint-Germain d'Auxerre, he studied with Lupus Servatus and Haimo of Auxerre. His own students included Remigius of Auxerre and Hucbald. His Miracula sancti Germani was a verse life of St. Germanus. Other works include his Collectaeum, a homiliary, and glosses on the Categoriae decem.

== Life ==
Heiric of Auxerre was born in 841. When only about seven years old he entered the abbey of Saint-Germain d'Auxerre as an oblate. There his teacher was Haimo of Auxerre. From 859 to 860 he studied under Lupus Servatus at Ferrières, and from 862 to 865 he was at the abbey of Saint-Médard de Soissons, where he came into contact with John Scotus Eriugena. He then returned to his monastery at Auxerre and taught there until his death.

== Works ==
His chief work was a metrical Life of Germanus of Auxerre, considered one of the best hagiographical poems of the times, which he dedicated c. 876 to Charles the Bald. He also wrote 'Miracula S. Germani' in prose, and put together 'Collectanea', partly classical from Valerius Maximus, Suetonius and other sources, and partly theological; these were based on the teaching of Lupus and Haimo. He is important as a link between the Carolingian schools and the later Middle Ages, especially as the teacher of Remigius.
