= Martin of Laon =

A page of Martin's writing from his Graeco-Latin glossary

Martin of Laon (Latin: Martinus Hiberniensis, lit. Martin the Irishman; c. 819 – 875) was an Irish-born teacher and scribe at the cathedral school at Laon.

== Background ==
Hiberniensis, "one of the greatest Irish Carolingian scholars," notes that he was an exile in the Annals of Laon (Annales Laudunenses). There is not much known about the reason for his exile or what happened afterward.

== Career ==
Martin is assumed to have been a lay teacher all his adult life; there is no indication that he was a monk. He settled at Laon in the late 840s during the term of Bishop Pardule. By the early 850s, he was master of the cathedral school where he remained until the end of his life. His students included Dido, Manno, Bernard, and Hincmar.

His intellectual interests included computus, exegesis, medicine, history, grammar, and Greek. He annotated the Annals of Laon, the computistical works of Bede. He also provided a commentary on Martianus Capella's De nuptiis Philologiae et Mercurii and preserved fragments of a lost commentary on Virgil by Aelius Donatus.

Following the deposition of Hincmar, Martin actively helped restore order in the cathedral chapter.

A copy of a letter from Martin to a fellow humanist, Servatus Lupus of Ferrières, has survived. Martin is thought to have corresponded with Irish and continental scholars at the court of Charles the Bald.

== Greek literature ==
"Martin is especially remarkable for his considerable knowledge of Greek, being particularly noted as the scribe of the most extensive Greek-Latin thesaurus then in existence in western Europe (Laon MS 444), which he may possibly have copied from an Irish exemplar. He has also been credited with a work known as 'Scholica graecarum glossarum,' a series of notes on Greek words. Additionally, he copied some Greek verse by John Scottus Eriugena, with whom he appears to have been acquainted." (Breen, 2009, p. 405)

== Scribal innovations ==
Martin was an innovative calligrapher. He contributed to what is called the 'grammar of legibility' by use of word separation and punctuation, almost unheard of in his lifetime. "In his role as teacher and supervisor of a school of scribes he cultivated the use of Carolingian minuscule, a very neat and legible type" in place of his native insular script (Breen, 2009, p. 405)

At least twenty-one manuscripts survive containing specimens of his autograph, which are now housed in Laon, Paris, and Berlin.

== Manuscripts ==
Martin was an avid collector of manuscripts, which he bequeathed to Laon.

== Summation ==
Breen (2009, p. 405) describes Martin's legacy as not as an original thinker and translator of works in Greek, but as a humanist and educator of great distinction.

== Notes and references ==
- Moran, Dermot. The Philosophy of John Scottus Eriugena. Cambridge University Press, 1989.
- Breen, Aidan. Martinus (Martin) Hiberniensis, in Dictionary of Irish Biography, Cambridge, 2009, pp. 404–05.
