= Ignaz Schönbrunner =

Austrian painter

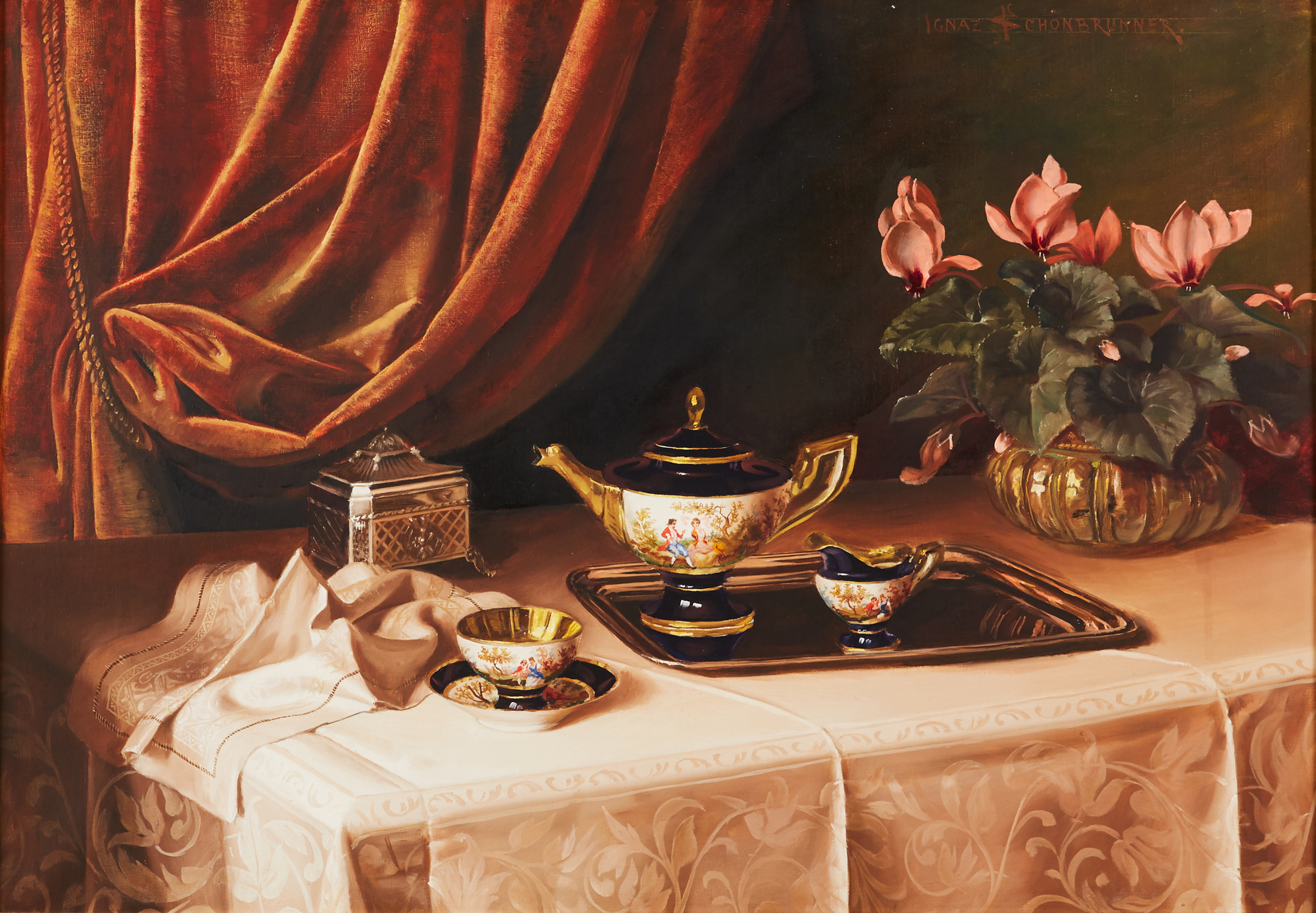
Still Life by Ignaz Schönbrunner, circa 1880

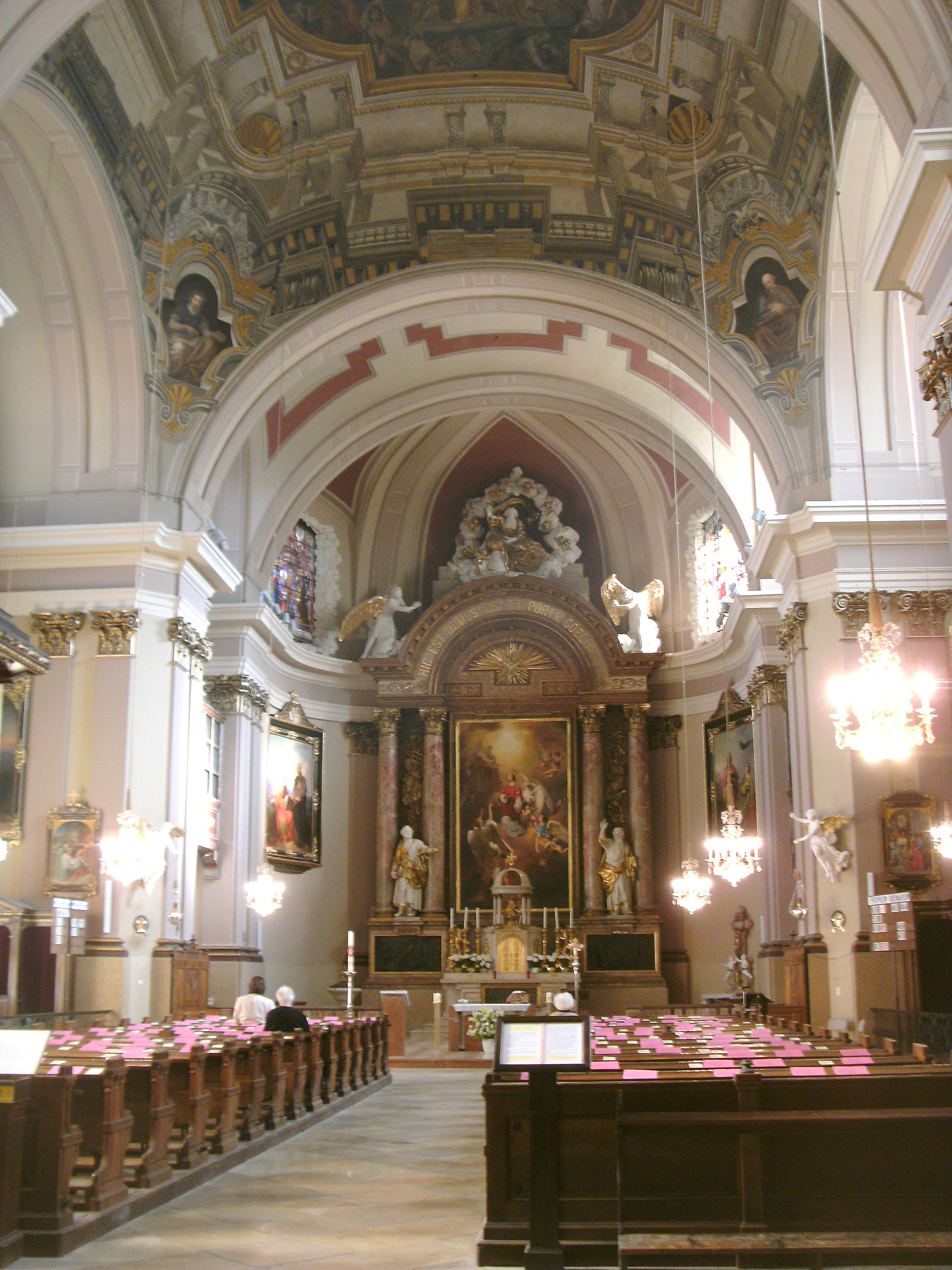
Interior of Sankt Laurenz am Schottenfeld parish church, Vienna's 7th district

Ignaz Johann Schönbrunner (May 1, 1835 – February 13, 1921), also known as Ignaz Schönbrunner the Elder, was an Austrian painter.

== Biography ==
Born in Vienna in the family of a carpenter, Johann S. Schönbrunner. Studied in 1852–1858 at the Academy of Fine Arts (including with Carl Rahl), then 1858–1861 with Josef Führich and specialized in mural painting. In 1866 he was involved in the interior design of the Vienna Court Opera. 1869-1871 he created ceiling paintings in the Schottenfelder Laurenzius Church. In 1869 he joined the Austrian Artists' Society (Vienna Künstlerhaus).
