= Beppo Mauhart =

Austrian business executive

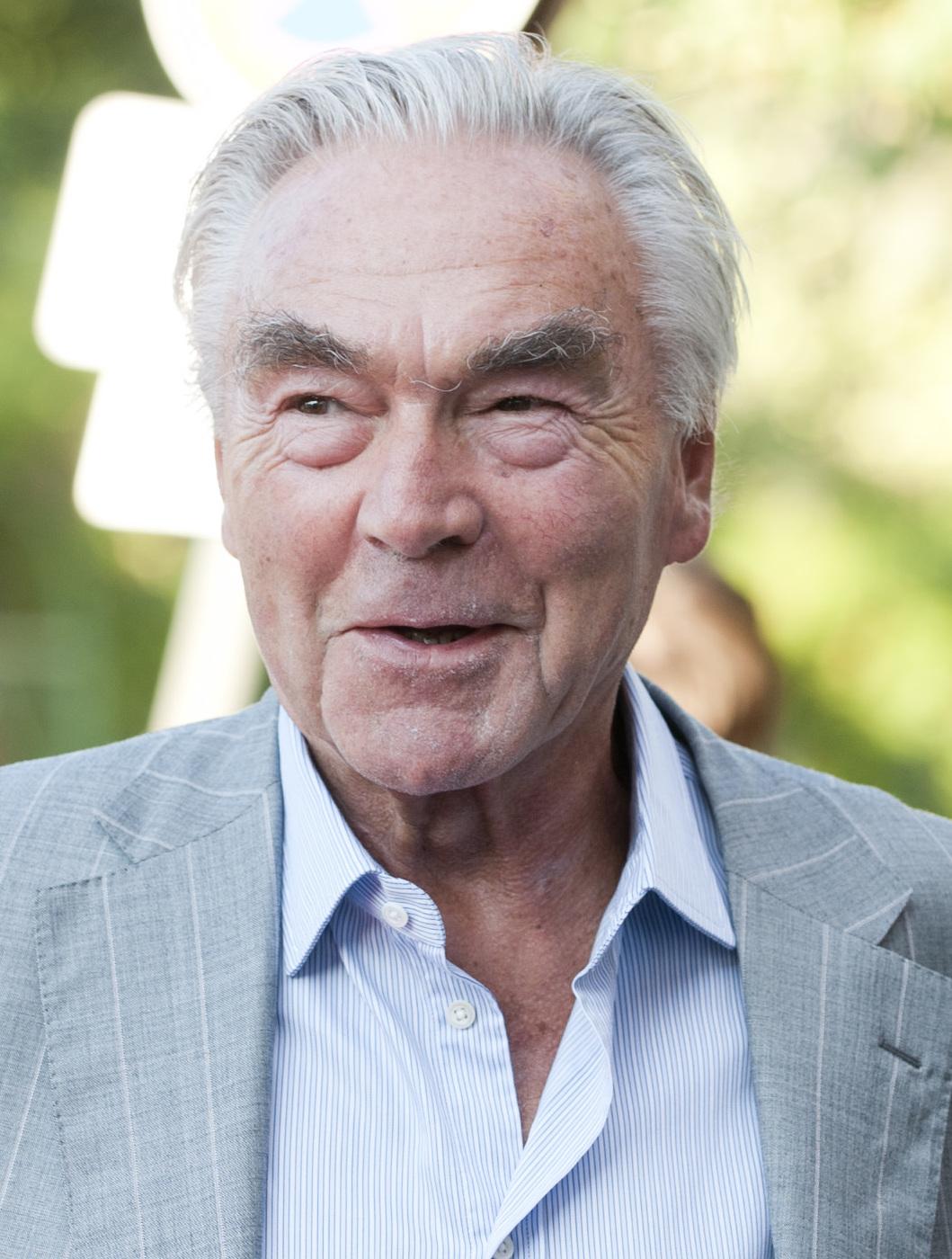
- Born: Josef Mauhart; 14 September 1933; Enns, Upper Austria
- Died: 7 May 2017 (aged 83)
- Education: Wilhering College
- Occupations: Journalist and manager
- Years active: 1963–1995
- Title: President of the Austrian Football Association
- Term: 1984–2002
- Predecessor: Herbert Raggautz and Heinz Gerö (interim)
- Successor: Friedrich Stickler

Josef "Beppo" Mauhart (14 September 1933 – 7 May 2017) was an Austrian business executive. During his career, he worked as a newspaper executive and chief executive officer of Austria Tabak. He was also the longest serving president of the Austrian Football Association.

== Biography ==
Mauhart received his Matura at the Wilhering College in Wilhering. After his studies, he was editor of the newspaper of the Freier Wirtschaftsverband as of 1963. In 1970, he worked as the secretary for Hannes Androsch at the Ministry of Finance. He was appointed to the supervisory board of Austria Tabak in 1972 and became deputy chairman there in 1976.

In 1977, Austria Tabak became a sponsor of the FK Austria Wien football club. The club changed its name to Austria Memphis – a cigarette brand.

From 1988 to 1995, Mauhart was CEO of Austria Tabak.

From 1984 to 2002, Mauhart was president of the Austrian Football Association. He had the longest tenure in the history of the association.

Under the leadership of Mauhart, the Wirtschaftsinititative Neues Künstlerhaus (English: Economic Initiative New Artist House), WINK, was established in 2005, together with the association of visual artists in Austria and on the initiative of its then-President Manfred Nehrer. The association was founded to support the Vienna Künstlerhaus in the collection of sponsorship money in order to renovate the building. In 2011 and 2012 the legendary Künstlerhaus-Gschnas was held once again, this time as a charity event.

Mauhart was vice president of the association Bildungsinitiative für die Zukunft (English: educational initiative for the future). The association was responsible for the referendum Bildungsinitiative in November 2011.

Mauhart died on 7 May 2017 at the age of 83.
