= Cruindmelus =

Cruindmelus, a.k.a. Crundmáel, Irish monk and teacher, fl. first half of 9th century.

== Overview ==
Cruindmelus was one of many Irish teachers on mainland Europe who were favoured by Charlemagne. Others included Clement of Ireland, Dungal of Bobbio and Donatus of Fiesole.

== See also ==
- Hiberno-Latin
