= Monastic school =

Institutions of higher learning of the Early Middle Ages

Monastic schools (Latin: Scholae monasticae) were, along with cathedral schools, the most important institutions of higher learning in the Latin West from the early Middle Ages until the 12th century. Since Cassiodorus's educational program, the standard curriculum incorporated religious studies, the Trivium, and the Quadrivium. In some places monastic schools evolved into medieval universities which eventually largely superseded both institutions as centers of higher learning.

== History ==
Since the cenobitic rule of Pachomius (d. 348 AD) and the sixth-century Rule of the Master and the Rule of St. Benedict, monks and nuns were required to actively engage in reading. This reading took on the characteristics of a school that dealt with both religious and secular subjects. Beginning in the 5th century, a variety of abbots took upon themselves the responsibility of educating those who entered the monastery at a young age. The earliest of these monastic schools had more of a spiritual and ascetic focus than a scriptural or theological one, but it has been suggested that these were the qualities that led many monks trained at the monastic school at Lerins to be selected as bishops.

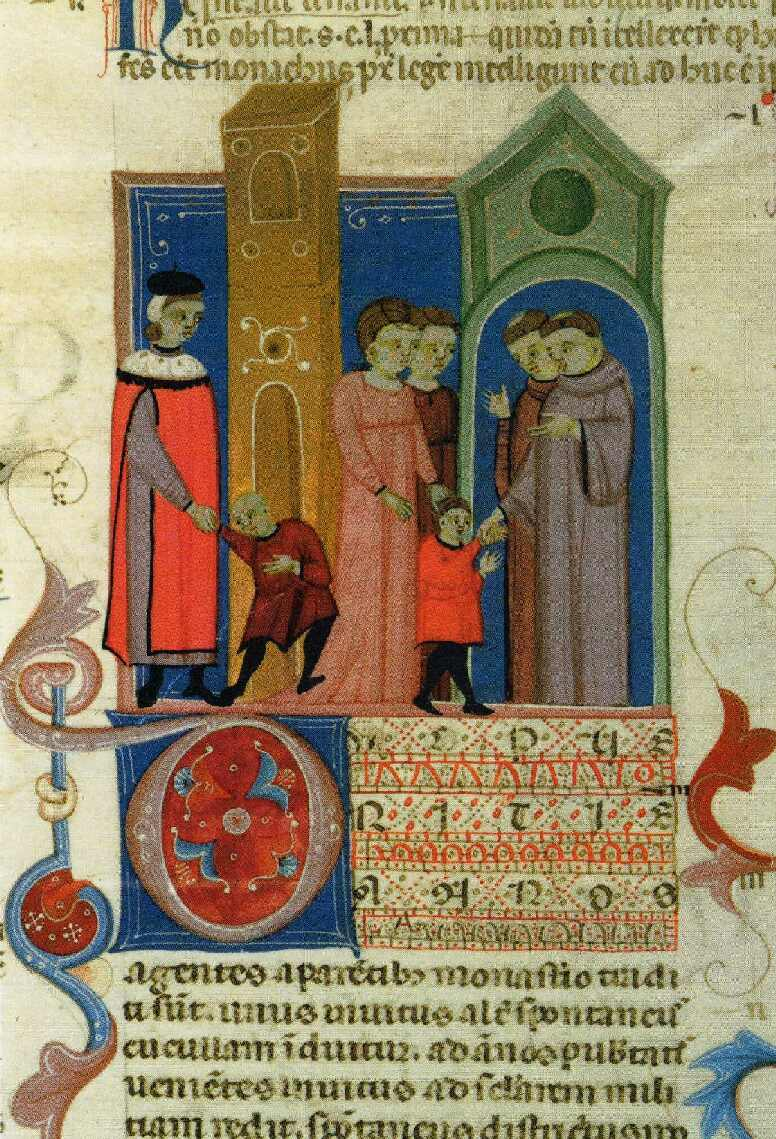
Boys going to school, Bolognese manuscript of the Decretum Gratiani, 14th century

The Roman statesman Cassiodorus had abandoned politics in 537 and later in the century established a monastery on his own lands at Vivarium in southern Italy. Cassiodorus stipulated that his monastery would be a place of study, providing a guide for that study in his Introduction to the Divine and Human Readings (Institutiones), which encompassed both religious texts and works on the liberal arts. Cassiodorus set out this program of study as a substitute for the Christian school he and Pope Agapetus had hoped to establish in Rome. In any event, the curriculum that Cassiodorus set out involved the literary study of well-established texts that he had listed in his Institutiones, following the rules that he laid out in his De orthographia.

Centers of learning were also found in seventh-century Spain, both at major monasteries and at episcopal centers. Students at the monastery of Saints Cosmas and Damian, at Agali near Toledo, learned such scientific subjects as medicine and the rudiments of astronomy.

In the heyday of the monastic schools in the 9th and 10th centuries, the teachings of important scholars such as Alcuin, Hrabanus Maurus, Heiric of Auxerre and Notker Balbulus raised the prestige of their abbeys and attracted pupils from afar to attend their courses.

Although some monastic schools contributed to the emerging medieval universities, the rise of the universities did not go unchallenged. Some monastic figures such as Bernard of Clairvaux considered the search for knowledge using the techniques of scholasticism to be a challenge to the monastic ideal of simplicity. The rise of medieval universities and scholasticism in the Renaissance of the 12th century offered alternative venues and new learning opportunities to the students and thus led to a gradual decline of the monastic schools.

== Contributions to science in the Middle Ages ==
The monastery played a large role in the preservation and continuation of science throughout the Middle Ages. The largest part of their contribution was keeping the textual traditions of philosophers the likes of Aristotle and Plato alive in the transition from the height of Classical learning into the Middle Ages. In between prayer, meals, and sleeping, monks engaged in various labor activities in accordance to the Benedictine Rule. These activities ranged from gardening to copying texts. Through the latter, monks became learned in the Classical Greek texts and later began to contribute their own knowledge to more practical and daily texts. Much of the great libraries and scriptoria that grew in monasteries were due to obligation of the monks to teach the young boys who came to them having been committed to the monastic life by their parents.

Cassiodorus wrote a handbook for his monastery in which he recommends numerous pagan authors for studying by the monks. Although it is understood that Cassiodorus recommended those studies that enhanced spiritual learning or served some kind of sacred purpose, it is vital to remember that the study of classical and secular texts did exist in monasteries. The idea that many great texts of the Classical period would have been lost without the dedication of the monks, is a very real one. It may even be said that they saved many of the Classical Greek texts from extinction.

Medical practice was highly important in medieval monasteries. Caring for the sick was an important obligation. There is evidence of this from the monastery Vivarium, the monastery of Cassiodorus, whose monks were instructed to read the medical works of Greek writers such as Hippocrates, Galen, and Dioscorides. There is also evidence for the use of secular texts on medicine. It is likely that most monasteries had large amounts of expertise in medical practice. Despite the monastery school's obvious focus on theological instruction, they did hold a place for Classical and secular medical texts. It is through medical instruction in monasteries that the Classical medical texts survived through the early part of the Middle Ages.

Herbals are one of the largest and most well-known contributions of monastic schools to science, offering some of the most comprehensive amounts of historical evidence. Monasteries were, and are still today, isolated centers. This meant that they had to be able to provide treatment for themselves, including treating the monks who would become ill. Since maintaining a hospital wing was a necessity, it is no surprise that monks invested a lot of time on medical treatment. At the time, this was almost exclusively through herbal medicine. Much of the evidence for their contributions to this field can be found as notes in the margins of herbal texts of the medieval time period. Some of the contributions that they made were to the general agriculture of growing herbs such as which plants can be or should be grown in the same vicinity, and what is the best location in the garden for the optimum amount of sunlight to reach any given plant. Much of the knowledge of exotic plants that can be found in herbals are due to trading of the plants themselves and knowledge between monasteries. While not a monk, Hildegard of Bingen, a nun who lived an equally cloistered life to the monks, is well known for her contributions to the medical tradition in the Middle Ages.

Although medieval monasteries are most known for their contributions to medical tradition, they also had a hand in other sciences. One of these sciences that would have been important to life in the monastery is astronomy. While they did not put forth new information or advancements in the field, they did continue its use. If they were not going to add to astronomy, then why was it important? As previously stated, monasteries had to be self-sufficient. That meant that in order to comply to their religious obligations they had to be able to tell the time. This ranged from a day to day timekeeping for prayer to yearly observations. Astronomy was particularly important to the yearly religious calendar and the observation of such feasts as Christmas and Easter.

In the grand scheme of intellectual advancement, monasteries and monastery schools make up a small portion of the larger whole. They were, however, important in their own right in their contribution to the preservation of textual philosophical and scientific tradition. Monasteries provided a stable environment for learning in medieval Europe. While much of the learning was contained to the confines of the monastery walls, knowledge did extend beyond the relatively isolated centers through travelers and pilgrims who would stay at the monasteries.

== See also ==
- Carolingian Schools
- Science and the Catholic Church
