= Ferrières-en-Gâtinais =

- Commune
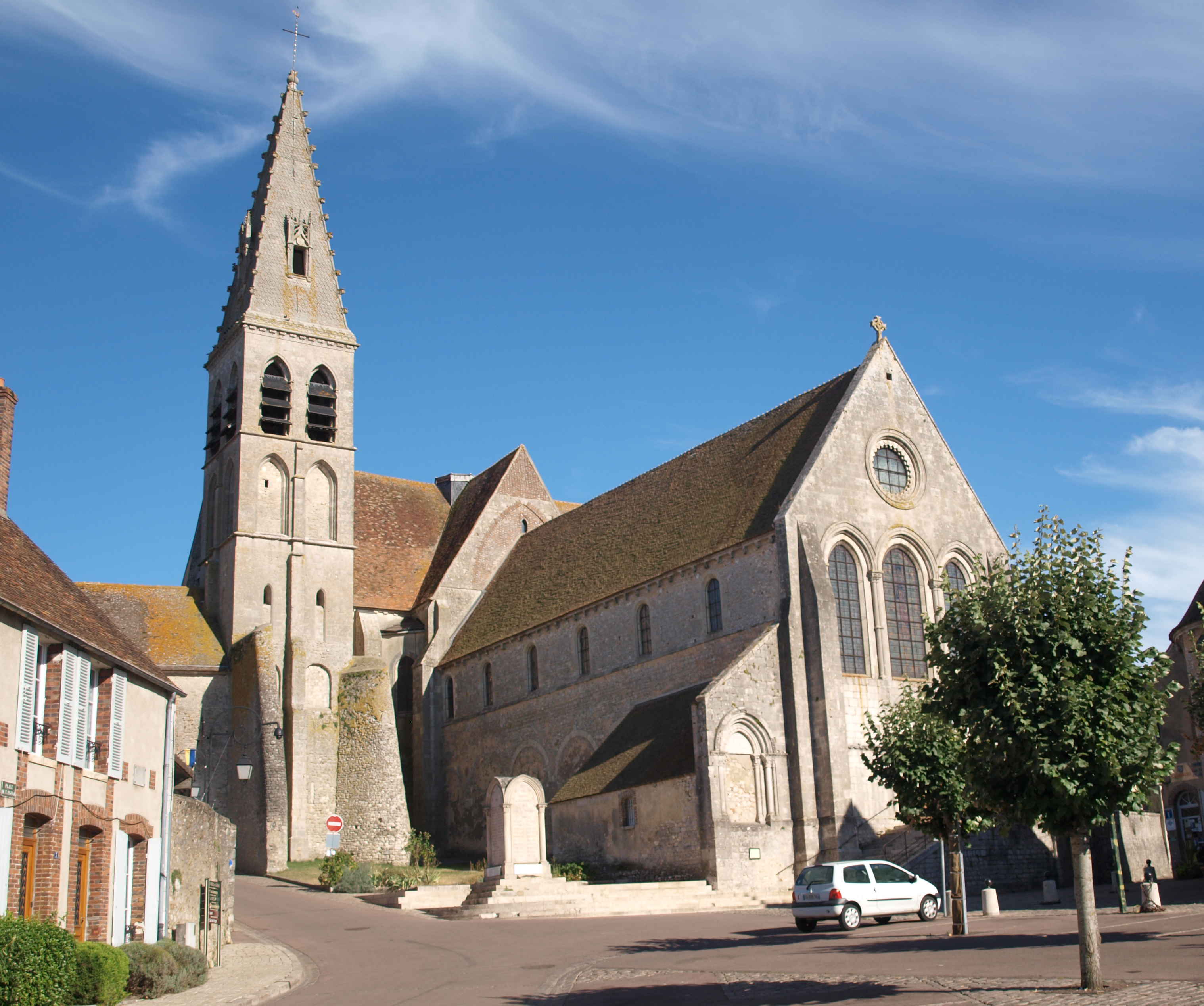
- The church in Ferrières-en-Gâtinais

- Coat of arms
- Location of Ferrières-en-Gâtinais
- Location within France Location within Centre-Val de Loire
- Coordinates: 48°05′35″N 2°47′25″E
- Country: France
- Region: Centre-Val de Loire
- Department: Loiret
- Arrondissement: Montargis
- Canton: Courtenay
- Intercommunality: Quatre Vallées

Government
  - Mayor (2020–2026): Gérard Larcheron
- Area^{1}: 15.87 km^{2} (6.13 sq mi)
- Highest elevation: 121 m (397 ft)
- Lowest elevation: 72 m (236 ft)
- Population (2023): 3,839
  - Density: 241.9/km^{2} (626.5/sq mi)
- Time zone: UTC+01:00 (CET)
  - Summer (DST): UTC+02:00 (CEST)
- INSEE/Postal code: 45145 /45210
- ^{1} French Land Register data, which excludes lakes, ponds, glaciers > 1 km^{2} (0.386 sq mi or 247 acres) and river estuaries.

Ferrières-en-Gâtinais (French pronunciation: [fɛʁjɛʁ ɑ̃ ɡɑtinɛ]; literally "Ferrières in Gâtinais", before 2001: Ferrières) is a commune in the Loiret department in north-central France.

Ferrières was the site of the Benedictine monastery Ferrières Abbey, which had an extensive library in the Middle Ages.

== Geography ==
The municipality is located in the Gâtinais region, north of the national forest (forêt domaniale) of Montargis, 13 km north of the town of Montargis, 81 km north-east of Orléans and 98 miles south of Paris. To the north the municipality borders the department of Seine-et-Marne. The Cléry, a tributary of the Loing, flows through the village.

The municipality contains the village of Ferrières and the hamlets of Saint-Séverin, Petit-Ambreville, Le Grand-Ambreville, Collumeaux, Egrefin, Birague, La Queue-de-l'étang, Tirelande, Le Perrocher, and La Grange Tascher.

== Population ==
Historical population
Year	Pop.	±% p.a.
1968	1,473	—
1975	1,806	+2.95%
1982	2,367	+3.94%
1990	2,896	+2.55%
1999	3,049	+0.57%
2007	3,330	+1.11%
2012	3,530	+1.17%
2017	3,687	+0.87%
2023	3,839	+0.68%
Source: INSEE

== See also ==
- Communes of the Loiret department
