= Vienna Künstlerhaus =

Art museum in Austria

Coordinates: 48°12′04″N 16°22′19″E

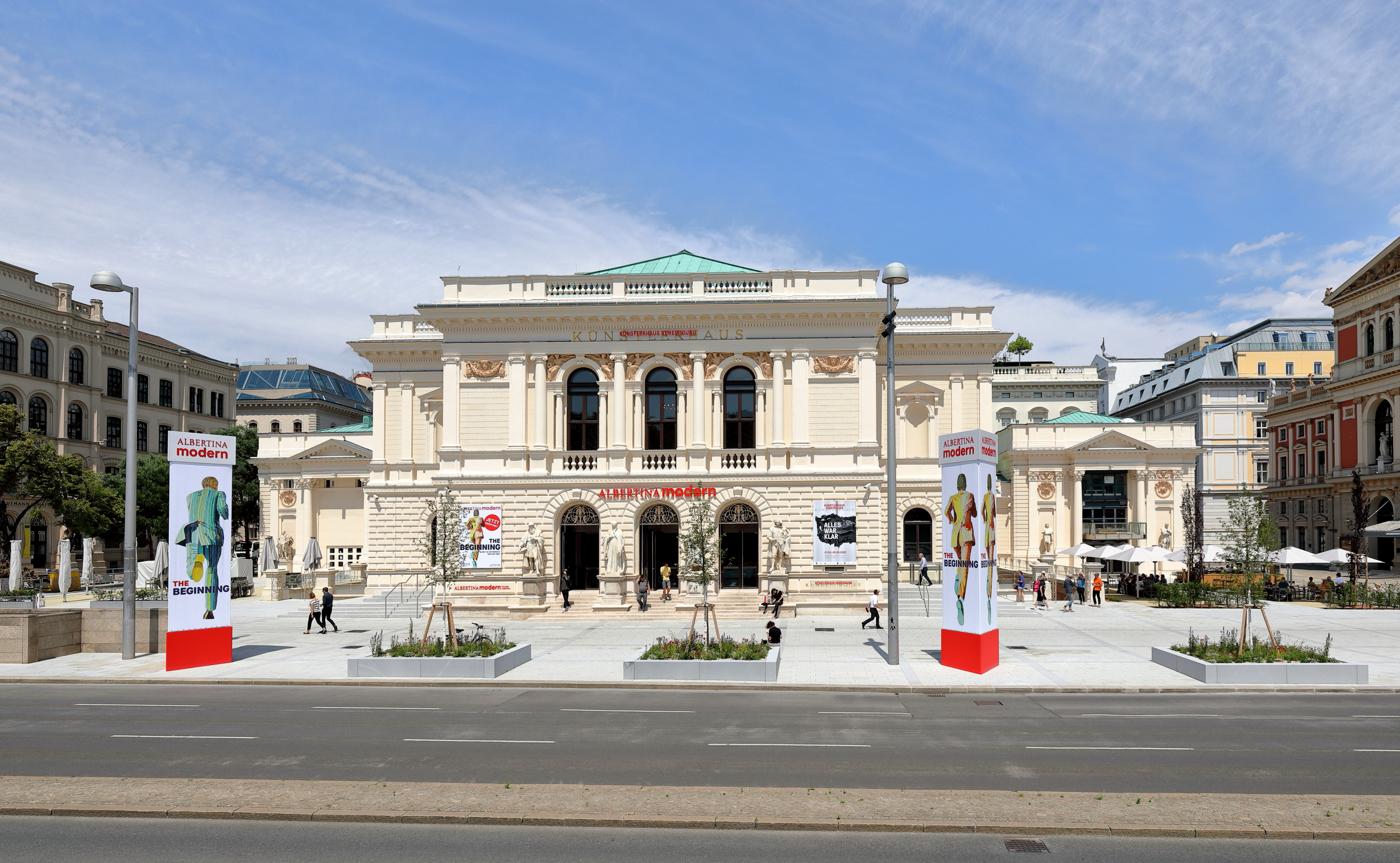
The Künstlerhaus, as seen from Karlsplatz

The Künstlerhaus in Vienna's 1st district has accommodated the Künstlerhaus Vereinigung since 1868. It is located in the Ringstrassenzone in between Akademiestraße, Bösendorferstraße and Musikvereinsplatz.

The building was erected between 1865 and 1868 and has served as an exhibition space and an event venue ever since. In 2015, shares were split between two proprietors, with the Haselsteiner Familien-Privatstiftung as the majority shareholder and the Künstlerhaus Vereinigung, Gesellschaft bildender Künstlerinnen und Künstler Österreichs, the oldest existing artists' association in Austria, as the minority shareholder. In 1949 a cinema moved into the western wing of the building. As of 2013, this cinema is operated as Stadtkino im Künstlerhaus and is one of the screening venues for the annual Viennale film festival. Additionally, a theatre was established in the eastern wing in 1974, which was last operated by the brut until 2017.

Between autumn 2016 and spring 2020, the Künstlerhaus faced a major renovation. During the reconstruction the former Altmann'sche Textilfabrik in Vienna-Margareten (Stolberggasse 26) served as its temporary accommodation. The newly refurbished Künstlerhaus was reopened on 6 March 2020. Today, the Künstlerhaus Vereinigung presents its exhibitions on the upper-floor of the building, while the Albertina Modern, which first opened its doors on 27 May 2020, shows/displays exhibitions on the ground- and underground-floor. Thus, the Künstlerhaus is now home to two independent cultural institutions.

== History of the society ==
The society has its roots in the suburb of Laimgrube, now part of Mariahilf. Here, on the site of a guesthouse, Leopold Ernst had a Neo-Gothic festival hall built (at a great loss) in 1847. The hall became the meeting place of the Society of Young Artists and Academics, which was founded in 1851 and later renamed the Albrecht Dürer Society.

In 1861 it merged with another artists' society, Eintracht, to form a new association representing Viennese painters, sculptors and architects: the Vienna Artists' Society. In 1868 the society moved into its current premises. In 1897 a number of modern artists seceded from the Künstlerhaus and founded the Vienna Secession.

In 1972 the society opened its membership to practitioners of applied art, and in 1976 it was renamed the "Austrian Artists' Society, Künstlerhaus". Since 1983 the Society has included filmmakers and audio-visual artists among its members. Its limited company (Künstlerhaus-Ges. m. b. H.), founded in 1985, organises exhibitions both for the Künstlerhaus and for other museums and institutions.

== History of the building ==
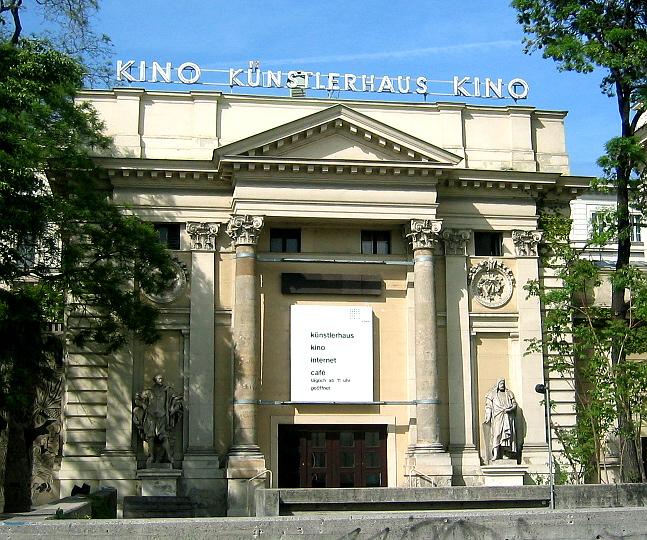
This side wing of the Künstlerhaus was used as a cinema

The architect of the building was August Weber (1836–1903). Several types of Austrian stone were used, supplied by the Viennese firm Anton Wasserburger. Emperor Franz Joseph I laid the keystone.

Opened on 1 September 1868 as one of the earliest Ringstraße buildings, it was designed in the style of an Italian Renaissance villa, after Jacopo Sansovino. At the time, it stood next to the banks of the Wien River, which still flowed openly in the city. The building was significantly expanded as early as 1882 with a pair of side wings. These were later used to house a cinema (from 1949) and a theatre (from 1974). Also in 1882, the Society held the "First International Art Exhibition in the Künstlerhaus". The inner garden was roofed over in 1888.

In the 20th century, real estate observers speculated that the Society was under pressure to demolish the building in favor of something larger, as it is unusually low-rise for the Ringstraße area, or to rebuild it. For example, the "Kaym-Hetmanek Plan" in the early 1930s proposed to replace the historic pavilion with eight-storey apartment blocks. The recommendations of an architectural planning competition for Karlsplatz in 1946 showed that the city of Vienna considered the Künstlerhaus, as well as the Office of Transport building, as expendable. In 1956–57 the Society modernised the Stiftersaal room.

In 1966, Karl Schwanzer proposed a plan to build large offices for IBM on the site of the Künstlerhaus, which met with widespread objections among residents and the media. The previous year, protests had followed the decision to tear down the old Florianikirche. The Society preserved the Künstlerhaus.

In the 21st century, new plans have been discussed to expand and rebuild the Künstlerhaus, so as to integrate it more closely into the "museum cluster" on Karlsplatz. For example, in July 2010 Beppo Mauhart proposed the addition of two new buildings to this site.
