= Dicuil =

Irish monk and geographer

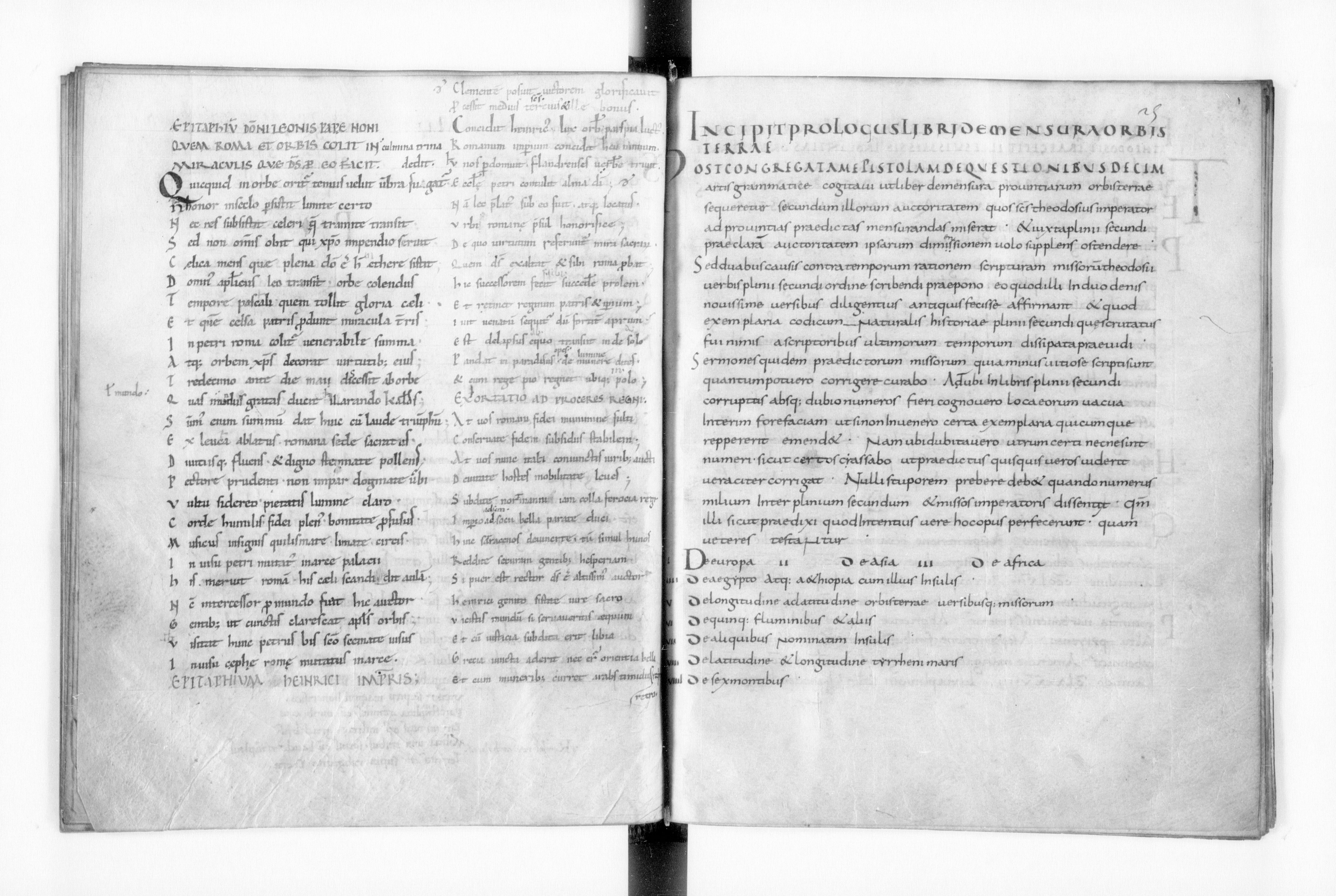
- Folio 25 of BnF Latin 4806, the earliest manuscript of De Mensura Orbis Terrae.

Personal life
- Born: 8th century (2nd half) Ireland?
- Died: After 825
- Main interest(s): Astronomy, Cosmography
- Notable work: De Mensura Orbis Terrae (825)
- Other name: Dicuilus

Religious life
- Religion: Catholicism

Dicuilus (Gaelic: Dícuil; fl.814–825 A.D.) was an Irish monk, astronomer, geographer and author born during the second half of the 8th century, possibly in the Hebrides. He travelled through Frankia around the turn of the 9th century and was involved with the Carolingian Renaissance under Louis the Pious. He was the author of astronomical and cosmographical treatises during the early 9th century, an example of Hiberno-Latin culture.

== Background ==
The exact dates of Dicuil's birth and death are unknown; indeed all details of his life are known only from his writings. Tierney suggests his birth to be sometime around c.760–770 A.D. Of his life nothing is known except that he probably belonged to one of the numerous Irish monasteries of the Frankish Kingdom, and became acquainted by personal observation with islands near England and Scotland. From 814 and 816 Dicuil taught in one of the schools of Louis the Pious, where he wrote an astronomical work, and in 825 a geographical work.

In book 7 chapter 6, Dicuil describes Ireland as "our own island" and how he had at times lived in the Hebrides:

We do not read of islands being found in the sea west or north of Spain. There are islands around our own island Hibernia, some small and some very small. Near the island Britannia are many islands, some large, some small, and some medium-sized. Some are in the sea to her south and some in the sea to her west, but they abound mostly to the north-west and north. Among these I have lived in some, and have visited others; some I have only glimpsed, while others I have read about.

Dicuil's reading was wide; he quotes from, or refers to, thirty Greek and Latin writers, including the classical Homer, Hecataeus, Herodotus, Thucydides, Virgil, Pliny and King Juba, the late classical Solinus, the patristic St Isidore and Orosius, and his contemporary the Irish poet Sedulius. In particular, he professes to utilize the alleged surveys of the Roman world executed by order of Julius Caesar, Augustus and Theodosius II.

Based on similarities of style, it has been suggested that Dicuil may be the same person as the anonymous Hiberno-Latin poet and grammarian known as Hibernicus exul.

== Astronomical computus ==
The astronomical work is a sort of computus of five books, in prose and verse. Four books are preserved in a manuscript which belonged formerly to the monastery of Saint-Amand in northern France, and is now at Valenciennes. A second manuscript is from the abbey of Saint Martin at Tours, and contains two chapters added to the fourth book, and two more chapters constituting a fifth book

Book 1 contains material on calendars, on 19-year lunar cycles, and on versification. It also contains an account of the two methods of calculating triangular numbers: by summation of the natural numbers, or by the multiplication together of two consecutive numbers divided by two

Book 2 contains material on the distance between the Earth and the heavens, and between the seven planets; methods for counting the lunar months; the monthly age of the moon; rules for calculating Easter and Lent; intercalary days (extra days) and subtracted days; solar and lunar years; more on versification.

Book 3 contains material on cycles of the stars; 19 year lunar cycles; other large cycles of the Sun and Moon; the first day of the natural year (the spring equinox in March).

Book 4 contains material on solar intercalary days and lunar subtracted days; and on the relative speed of travel of the Moon, Sun and stars.

== De mensura Orbis terrae ==
Better known is the De mensura Orbis terrae, completed in 825 A.D; a summary of geography, giving concise information about various lands. This work was based upon a Mensuratio orbis prepared by order of Emperor Theodosius II (AD 435), a manuscript copy of which was possessed by the Carolingian court. Godescalc had already made use of this copy (781–783) for the composition of his celebrated Evangelistarium. Dicuil uses Pliny the Elder, Gaius Julius Solinus, Paulus Orosius, Isidore of Seville, and other authors, and adds the results of his own investigations.

In the nine sections he treats successively of Europe, Asia, Africa, Egypt, and Ethiopia, the area of the Earth's surface, the five great rivers, certain islands, the length and breadth of the Tyrrhenian Sea, and the six (highest) mountains.

Although mainly a compilation, this work is not without value. Dicuil is our only source for detailed information of the surveys performed by order of Theodosius II; his quotations, generally exact, are of service for the textual criticism of the authors mentioned; of great interest, too, are the few reports which he got from the travellers of his time; as, for instance, from the monk Fidelis who (possibly in 762 AD) journeyed along the canal then still existing, between the River Nile and the Red Sea; and from clerics who had visited the Faroe Islands and lived possibly in Iceland for six months during the summer of 795. Among their claims are the perpetual day at midsummer in "Thule," where there was then "no darkness to hinder one from doing what one would." They also described navigating the sea north of Iceland on their first arrival, and found it ice-free for one day's sail.

=== Publication history ===
==== Manuscripts ====
Three prototype manuscripts forming the basis of the textual tradition of the Orbis are known:

Manuscripts of the Mensura Orbis
Siglum	Library	Shelfmark	Folios	Date (century)	Fate	Souce
P	BnF	Lat. 4806	25r–40r	late 9th	Extant	
D	Saxon State and University Library Dresden	De 182	50v–62v	9th – 10th	Destroyed during the Bombing of Dresden	
σ	Cathedral Library of Speyer	Codex Spirensis		early 10th	Lost	

Later medieval manuscripts also exist such as Bodleian MS. Canon. Misc. 378 (copied in 1436).

==== Published editions ====
The geography manuscript was known to Marcus Welser, Isaac Vossius, Claudius Salmasius, Jean Hardouin, and Johann Daniel Schöpflin. The three complete editions published so far have been:

- Walckenaer, C. A. (1807). Dicuili Liber de mensura orbis terrae ex duobus codd. mss. bibliothecae imperialis nunc primum in lucem editus a Car. Athan. Walckenaer (in Latin). Paris: ex typis F. Didot.
- Parthey, G. (1870). Dicvili Liber de Mensvra Orbis Terrae [Book of the Measurement of the World] (in Latin). Berlin: F. Nicolai.
- Tierney, J. J.; Beiler, L. (1967). Dicuil: Liber de Mensura Orbis Terrae. The Dublin Institute of Advanced Studies.

Tierney's 1967 edition is currently the only complete translation of the work into English.
