= Hibernicus exul =

Anonymous 8th-century Irish poet

- Occupations: poet, grammarian, dialectician
- Writing career
- Language: Latin
- Period: 8th century AD
- Notable work: Ad Karolum Regem
- Movement: Carolingian art

Hibernicus exul (fl. 8th century) was an anonymous Irish Latin poet, grammarian, and dialectician. His works include a comic mock epic, a panegyric to Charlemagne, epigrams of advice to young scholars, and a poetic overview of the seven liberal arts.

== Overview ==
Hibernicus exul is Latin for "Hibernian exile". This is the name given to an anonymous Hiberno-Latin poet of the Carolingian Renaissance who lived and wrote in Francia. The poet has been variously identified with both Dungal and Dicuil. Thirty-eight of his poems are extant, all of which are preserved in a single manuscript in the Vatican Library (Bibl. Apostolica, Reg. lat. 2078).

== Ad Karolum Regem ==
The anonymous exile's most famous work is a fragmentary Latin eclogue praising Charlemagne for his defeat of Tassilo III of Bavaria in 787.

The poem, Ad Karolum Regem ("To King Charles") in the Monumenta Germaniae Historica and In Praise of Poetry in Peter Godman's excerpted English translation, is written as a dialogue between poet and Muse (the parts of which are difficult for modern editors to perfectly discern), an idea picked up by Walahfrid Strabo.

The poem begins with a description of Charlemagne and Tassilo, dux inclitus ("distinguished duke"). Charlemagne's gifts to the disobedient Tassilo, Tassilo's ceremonious submission and payment of tribute, and the reconciliation of the two Christian princes are the major themes of the opening part of the work. The remainder is filled with the dialogue of the humble poet and the Muse who shows him the immortality of poetry.

To the historian, the exul's poem indicates the high value ascribed to generosity and reconciliation amongst Christians and portrays the defeated duke in a fair light. The exaltation of poetry (by a poet) was necessary in a world that concentrated on material and especially martial success. The poet also affirms that secular subjects are equally worthy as sacred ones for versification, making the Ad Karolum Regum one of the earliest Latin Christian defences of courtly/public panegyric.

== Epigrams ==
Hibernicus exul also wrote a couple of Latin epigrams illustrating two contrasting pedagogical methods: encouragement and threat. The first draws on proverbs in the Disticha Catonis and goes like this:

Discite nunc, pueri! Docilis cito vertitur aetas,
Tempora praetereunt axe rotante diem.
Ardenti ut sonipes carpit celer aequora cursu,
Sic volat, heu, iuvenis non remanente gradu.
Curvantur facili vi lenta cacumina virgae,
Sed rigidos ramos flectere nemo valet.
Dum faciles animi vobis sint forte, sodales,
Discere ne pigeat scita superna dei.
Ne bene concessum spatium perdatis inane,
Nam sine doctrina vita perit hominum.

Translation:

Learn now, boys! The age for learning passes swiftly,
time goes by, as the heavens revolve the days follow.
Just as the swift charger gallops eagerly over the fields,
so youth flies by without lingering as it passes.
The pliant tip of the twig curves beneath an easy pressure
but no one can bend the stiff boughs.
While your minds happen to be receptive, my friends,
waste no time and learn the divine commands of God.
Do not squander the period generously granted to you,
for without learning the life of man perishes.

== Critical thoughts on the poems ==
The Catholic Encyclopedia has the following to say of Hibernicus:

"The poems of this exile show that he was not only a poet but a grammarian and dialectician as well. They also reveal his status as that of a teacher, probably in the palace school. Of more than ordinary interest are the verses which describe the attitude of the ninth-century teacher towards his pupils. His metrical poem on the seven liberal arts devotes twelve lines to each of the branches, grammar, rhetoric, dialectic, etc., showing the origin, scope, and utility of each in succession. Like the lines on the same subject by Theodulf of Orléans, they may have been intended to accompany a set of pictures in which the seven liberal arts were represented. The style of these poems, while much inferior to that of the classical period is free from many of the artificialities which characterize much of the versification of the early Middle Ages."
