= Wilhering =

Wilhering Wilaring
- Municipality
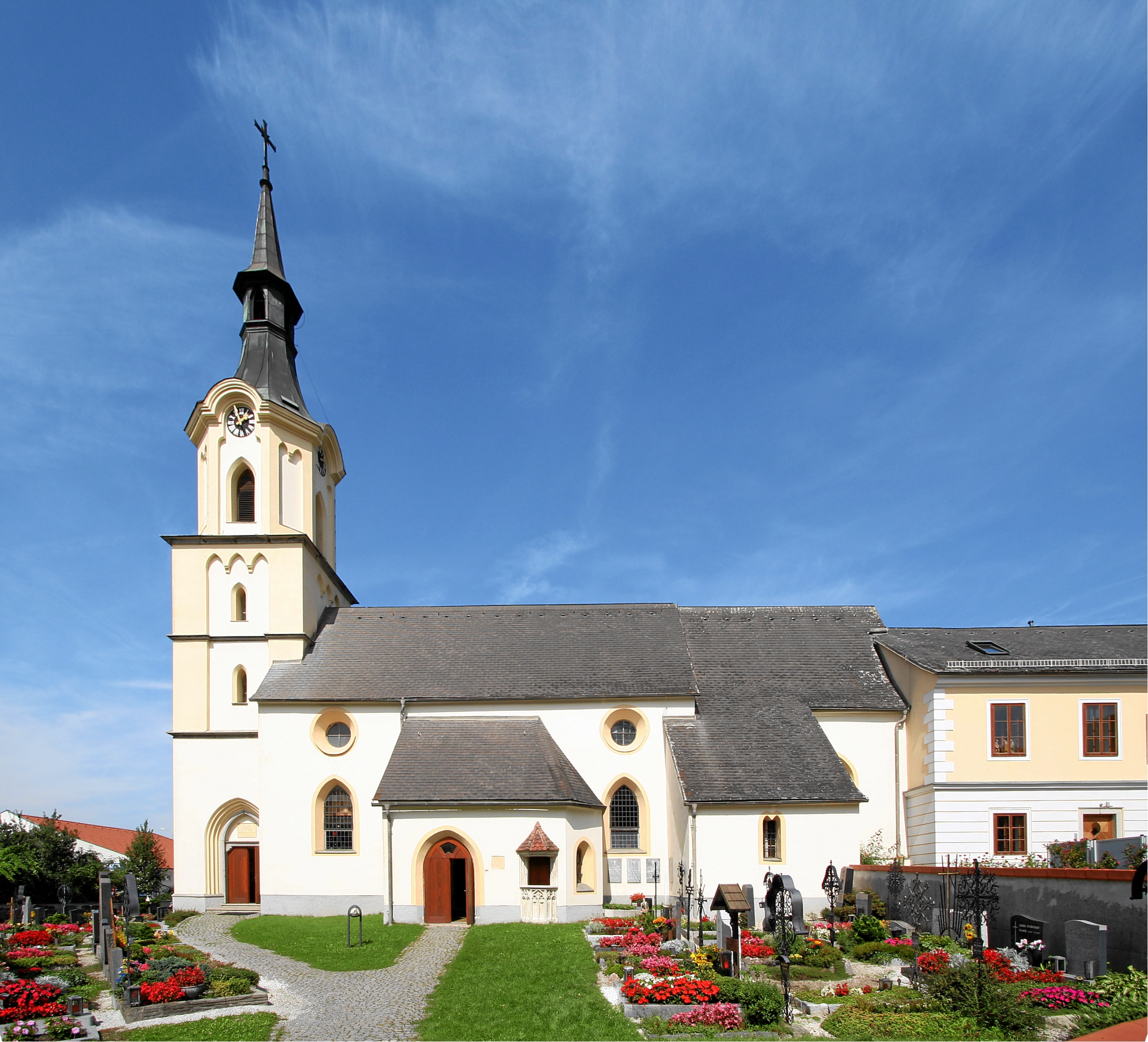

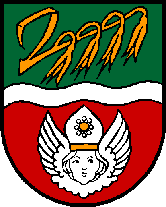
- Coat of arms

- Location within Austria
- Coordinates: 48°19′22″N 14°11′30″E
- Country: Austria
- State: Upper Austria
- District: Linz-Land

Government
  - Mayor: LAbg. Mario Wolfgang Mühlböck (SPÖ)

Area
  - Total: 29.97 km^{2} (11.57 sq mi)
- Elevation: 270 m (890 ft)

Population (2018-01-01)
  - Total: 5,911
  - Density: 197.2/km^{2} (510.8/sq mi)
- Time zone: UTC+1 (CET)
  - Summer (DST): UTC+2 (CEST)
- Postal code: 4073
- Area code: 0 72 26
- Vehicle registration: LL
- Website: www.wilhering.at

Wilhering (Central Bavarian: Wilaring) is a municipality in the district Linz-Land in the Austrian state of Upper Austria.

Its slogan is "culture and life". There is the Wilhering Abbey, a Cistercian Abbey, and a Rococo church, and woods around. The Cisterican Abbey was established in the 1146 and was then rebuilt after it had been burnt down. It contains sketches and paintings by Austrian Baroque painters. The church has a Rococo interior which is one of the best examples of this style in Austria.

== Population ==
Historical population
Year	Pop.	±%
1869	1,690	—
1880	1,654	−2.1%
1890	1,646	−0.5%
1900	1,692	+2.8%
1910	1,848	+9.2%
1923	1,958	+6.0%
1934	1,919	−2.0%
1939	2,137	+11.4%
1951	2,446	+14.5%
1961	2,568	+5.0%
1971	4,079	+58.8%
1981	4,108	+0.7%
1991	4,649	+13.2%
2001	5,191	+11.7%
2011	5,778	+11.3%

== Politics ==
The mayor of the city is Mario Mühlböck of the SPÖ, the leading party in Wilhering.

== Education and schools ==
Wilhering has an education and child care facility. There are three elementary schools in Dörnbach, Schönering and Wilhering, and a middle school until eighth grade. The Stifter High School is a private school in Wilhering. Wilhering has two kindergartens.

== Public transport ==
Wilhering has its own public transport, a bus company that covers the entire municipality called WILIA, founded 1930.
