= Clement of Ireland =

Irish Catholic saint

Saint Clement of Ireland
- Born: c. 750 AD; Ireland
- Died: 818 AD; Auxerre, France
- Venerated in: Roman Catholic Church
- Feast: 20 March

Saint Clement of Ireland (Clemens Scotus) (c. 750 – 818) is venerated as a saint by the Catholic Church.

== Biography ==
Born in Ireland, he founded a school for boys under the patronage of Charlemagne and figures in the Carolingian Renaissance of learning.

A monk of St. Gall, usually identified as Notker the Stammerer, who wrote a Life of Charlemagne dedicated to Charles the Fat (d. 888), says that Clement with his unnamed companion, both "Scots of Ireland" travelling in the company of traders, arrived on the coast of Gaul "in the moment when Charlemagne had begun to reign as sole king" (i.e. ca 771); they set themselves up in the market as venders of learning. Word of them reached the ear of Charlemagne, who sent for them to come to his court. Ailbe, Clement's companion, was then given the direction of the "monastery of Saint Augustine" near Pavia, identifiable as the Abbey of San Pietro in Ciel d'Oro, "sometimes named after Saint Augustine, because it contained many of his relics". Clement was requested to remain in France as the master of a school of learning for boys both noble and common, that was established and supported by Charlemagne. These events may have taken place in the winter of the year 774, after Charlemagne had been in Italy.

Clement was regent of the palace school at Paris until his death. It was not until 782 that Alcuin became master of the royal school at Aachen, but even the fame of Alcuin in no wise diminished the acknowledged reputation of Clement. Though St. Clement is no longer claimed as founder of the University of Paris, the fact remains that this remarkable Irish scholar planted the seeds of learning at Paris.

Many anecdotes are related of St. Clement's life, especially as regards his success as a teacher of youth. Among his pupils were Bruno, Modestus, and Candidus, who had been placed under his care in 803 by Ratgar, Abbot of Fulda. When Alcuin retired to Tours in 796, his post as rector of the School of the Palace was naturally given to Clement. In 803, as an old man, Alcuin wrote from his retirement to Charlemagne, querulously commenting on "the daily increasing influence of the Irish at the School of the Palace". Alcuin died 19 May 804, and Charlemagne survived till 28 January 814.

The 17th-century hagiographer John Colgan, in his Acta Sanctorum Hiberniae (Louvain, 1645) says that he was living in 818, and gives the date of Clement's death as 20 March and the place as Auxerre, where he was interred in the church of Saint-Amator.
