= Dungal =

Irish monk and teacher

Dungal (fl. 811–828) was an Irish monk, teacher, astronomer, and poet. He was to live at Saint-Denis, Pavia, and Bobbio.

He may be the same person as Hibernicus exul.

== Biography ==
Dungal was born in Ireland sometime in the late 8th century. His origins within Ireland are unknown, but he may have spent his student years at the School of Bangor. At some point either side of 800 he left Ireland. By 811 he was living at the monastery of Saint-Denis, near Paris. A letter of Alcuin appears to identify him as a bishop.

== Solar eclipses ==
In a letter, directed to Charlemagne, he answered Charlemagne's question of why two solar eclipses occurred in the year 810, drawing on his knowledge of the teachings of Macrobius, Pliny, and other ancient authors. This letter demonstrates "a knowledge of astronomy far beyond the current ideas of his time".

== Later life ==
Dungal wrote a poem on wisdom and the seven liberal arts. In 823, Dungal was mentioned in a capitulary of Lothair. In 825 he was by imperial decree appointed Master of the School at Pavia which was located in the monastery of San Pietro in Ciel d'Oro. In 827 or 828, he defended the veneration of images against Claudius, Bishop of Turin and wrote to refute some of his religious teachings at the request of the emperor Louis the Pious.

== Death and bequests ==
Dungal died at an unknown date after 827 or 828, probably at the Monastery of Bobbio. He bequeathed to Bobbio Abbey his valuable library, consisting of some 27 volumes, among which may have been the Antiphonary of Bangor.

== Latin texts by Dungal ==
- Carmina, Migne, Patrologia Latina, vol. 105: col 052-0532D
- Epistola de duplici Solis Eclipsi Anno 810, Migne, Patrologia Latina, vol. 105: col. 0447-0458C
- Responsa contra perversas Claudii Tauronensis Episcopi sententias, Migne, Patrologia Latina, vol. 105: col. 0465-0530A
- Carmina, De duplici solis eclipsi (Bibliotheca Augustana)
