= Lupus Servatus =

Benedictine monk during the Carolingian dynasty

Lupus Servatus, also Servatus Lupus (c. 805 – c. 862), in French Loup, was a Benedictine monk and Abbot of Ferrières Abbey during the Carolingian dynasty, who was also a member of Charles the Bald's court and a noted theological author of the 9th century. He is sometimes regarded as the first humanist of the Early Middle Ages because of the quality of his literary style, his love of learning, and his work as a scribe and textual critic.

== Early life ==
Lupus was born into an influential family within the Archdiocese of Sens. Many of his family held influential positions in the Church or court. His father was Bavarian and his mother Frankish. He assumed the nickname of Servatus in commemoration of his miraculous escape from danger either in a serious illness or on the battlefield. He began his education at the Abbey of Saints Peter and Paul in Ferrières-en-Gâtinais under St. Aldric, then abbot of the monastery. Here he was educated in the trivium and quadrivium.

Lupus was not fond of the required learning but developed a passion for Classical studies. Abbot Aldric saw fit to send him to deepen his theological education at the Abbey of Fulda under Rabanus Maurus. Spending years in study and writing he developed a reputation as a scholar. Rabanus made use of his pupil, having him translate and compose bodies or works. During his residence at Fulda (c. 830–36) he became an intimate friend and disciple of the learned Einhard, whose Vita Karoli magni he was one of the first to read and praised it because of its style (epist. 1, 5). Lupus had written a letter to Einhard expressing his admiration and asked for a loan of Einhard's secular works (this would become a common practice of Lupus). His opinion was that education should be esteemed and intended not for a certain purpose, but as a good of its own value (epist. 1, 5). He was interested therefore not only in Christian but also in pagan classical authors and even those who did not belong to the reading canon of the Carolingian schools, such as Suetonius, of whom he was one of very few readers in the early Middle Ages, and Cicero, whose works he seems to know almost in their entirety, not only his better known rhetorical writings, and whom he mentions and cites very often. He borrowed manuscripts from Einhard (epist. 1, 6) and from the library of the monastery of Fulda and corresponded therefore with Abbot Markward (epist. 10, 4; 91, 4).

Even before Lupus returned to France he had become favourably known at court and was especially esteemed by the Empress Judith, the second wife of Louis the Pious. Lupus returned to Ferrières in 836 and followed the normal life of a monk, although he became recognized as the literary leader of Ferrières, until his election as abbot on 22 November 840. He owed his election to Empress Judith and her son, Charles the Bald, whose political interests he always defended.

== Lupus as abbot ==
After Louis the Pious died in 840, there were widespread uprisings and rivalries. One of his other sons, Lothair, recently named as emperor, invaded the western territories of Charles, Louis' designated heir. The current Abbot of Ferrières, Odo, was uncertain which ruler had rights to his fealty. Eventually Odo supported Lothair either because he seemed far more likely to provide support for Ferrières or because he saw him as the legitimate heir and representative of the unity of the empire. When the Treaty of Verdun was negotiated, Lothair gave up to Charles authority over the lands where Ferrières was situated.

As a result of Odo's past support of Lothair, Charles had him removed from the abbacy. Lupus was left in charge of the abbey in Odo's absence. His position of abbot was formalized because of an election prompted by Charles the Bald, due to Lupus' ties to his family. Subsequently, Lupus took a prominent part in contemporary political and ecclesiastical events. As Abbot of Ferrières he devoted himself to the spiritual and earthly concerns of the monastery. He waged a war of letters to try to regain the land of Ferrieres which had been handed over to a private owner thereby causing the monastery's revenue to drop.

== Military service ==
In these days it was common for abbots to serve as military commanders who supplied their own forces, if the king decided to go to war. Ferrières was one of these monasteries that had to provide soldiers and accommodate them. Lupus was not fond of leading soldiers into battle. He wrote a letter to the Bishop of Pordalus, begging him to use his authority to influence the king so that he could carry on as an abbot, not as a military leader.

During the war between Charles the Bald and Pepin II of Aquitaine, Lupus was captured at the Battle of Toulouse and held prisoner. Shortly after his capture he was ransomed with several other high ranking men.

== Public affairs ==
In 844 Lupus was sent to Burgundy to carry out the monastic reforms decreed by the Synod of Germigny (843), and attended the Synod of Verneuil on the Oise, whose resulting canons had been written by him. He was also present at several other Church councils, notably that of Soissons in 853, and played an important part in the contemporary controversy regarding predestination. He believed in a twofold predestination, not indeed in the sense that God predestined some men to damnation, but that he foreknew the sins of men and foreordained consequent punishment. "Lupus not only took part in the most lively ecclesiastical controversy of his age, but also, by the method of his treatment, showed himself a skilled dialectician at the time when dialectics were still very imperfectly developed."

In 847 Lupus accompanied Charles the Bald to a conference at Meerssen, whereby the three brothers again swore peace with one other. He was sent on a mission to Pope Leo IV in 849. Following the invasion by Nominoe, the Governor of Brittany, Lupus composed the letter of censure. His last civic appearance was in 862 at the Synod of Pistes where he drew up a sentence against Robert, Archbishop of Mans.

The closing years of the life of Lupus were saddened by the threatened devastation of his monastery by the invading Normans. He occupies a prominent place in medieval literary history, being one of the most cultured and refined men of the ninth century.

== Writings ==
During the reign of Charles the Bald an enormous amount of written material was produced. Lupus' letters, of which 132 remain, are distinguished for literary elegance and valuable historical information. Most of these letters were written to church officials, monks in neighboring monasteries, clergymen, Popes Benedict III and Nicholas I, Charles the Bald and Lothair. His own writings show him as a classicist and admirer of the Ciceronian style. He made his vast translation of Cicero's letters serve as a code of communicating with other well-read individuals.

Lupus was requested in 839 by Waldo, the Abbot of St. Maximin of Treves, to write the Life of St. Maximin Bishop of Trier (d. 349) and a "Life of St. Wigbert", Abbot of Fritzlar in Hesse (d. 747). He also wrote his Epistolae in which almost on every page had forms of direct quotations and paraphrases revealing his familiarity of the Vulgate edition.

In the controversy on predestination he wrote his De tribus quaestionibus, a work which treated of the threefold question of free will, predestination, and the universality of redemption. To illustrate the teaching of the Church on these topics he brought together pertinent passages from the Church Fathers in his "Collectaneum de tribus quaestionibus".

== Literary contribution ==
Lupus made a tireless quest of manuscripts of classic authors, as it has long been known to readers of his letters. It is because of his passion for copying and preserving manuscripts so that they may be passed on that he is regarded as an influential literate figure and the first humanist. Though his personal works and letters discuss theological matters it was not his chief interest. Philology was his desired area of expertise. Scholars have increasingly become aware of the detailed examination that Lupus undertook when studying his acquired texts. The scholar E.K. Rand of Harvard University reveals: "no less than five manuscripts that contain the corrections or collations of Lupus and one that is entirely written by that scholar himself."

These manuscripts are rewrites of Cicero's De Oratore, his De Inventione and his Letters, a Commentary on Virgil and a revision of Codex Bernensis 366.

Over the years modern scholars have made investigations as to what Lupus had participated in. Charles H. Beeson has been the foremost scholar on Lupus Servatus. Beeson took to studying the different handwriting styles of manuscripts according to area of the Early Middle Ages. He concluded that Lupus had written or been a part of copying texts more than originally thought. Lupus had a rigid adherence to the rules of the Roman grammarians for the division of syllables, whereby any pronounceable group of consonants is placed with the following vowel. Lupus not only conformed to this rule in his personal practice, but also made the texts that he collected adhere to the style.
