= Ferrières Abbey =

Abbey in Loiret, France

Coordinates: 48.0901°N 2.7890°E

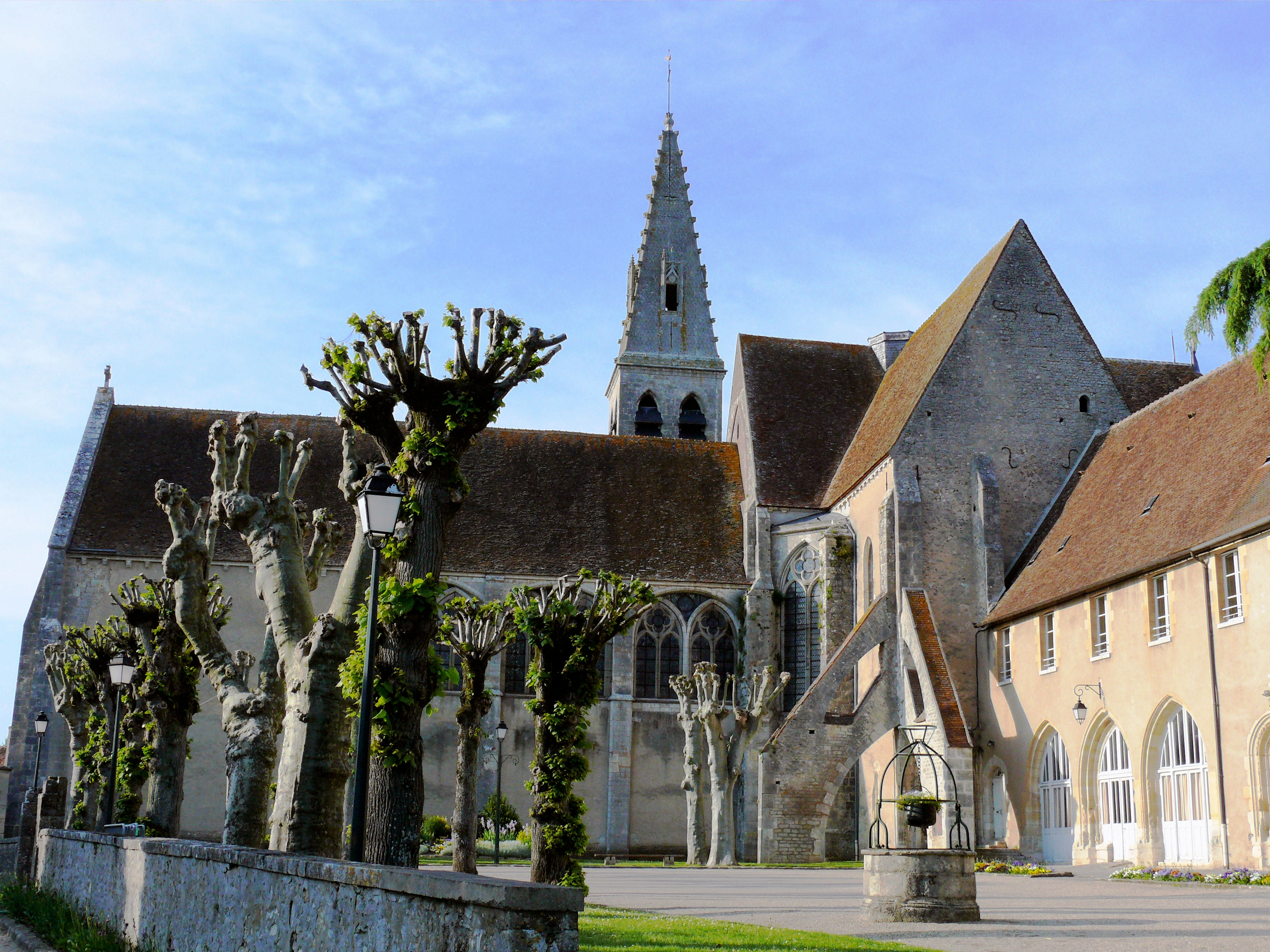
Church of Ferrières Abbey

Ferrières Abbey was a Benedictine monastery situated at Ferrières-en-Gâtinais in the arrondissement of Montargis, in the département of Loiret, France.

== History ==
Represented in the famous Monasticon Gallicanum, it seems clear that the abbey (despite a tradition based on the Acts of Saint Savinian and a forged charter of Clovis I, dated 508) was founded in about 630 by Columbanus, an Irish monk. The dedication was to Saints Peter and Paul. (According to Philippe Mazoyer there was before then at Ferrières a chapel dedicated to the Blessed Virgin under the title Notre-Dame de Bethleem de Ferrières).

It reached a height of prosperity in the time of Loup of Ferrières (c. 850), when the abbey became quite an active literary centre, but the library was destroyed at the same time as the monastery, and only rare fragments survive. One of these, preserved at the Vatican library (Reg.1573), recalls the memory of Aldric of Le Mans (d. 836), Abbot of Ferrières before he became Archbishop of Sens.

The Carolingian kings Louis III and his brother Carloman held their joint coronation at the abbey in 879, and were later buried there. It was restored in the 9th century by Louis the Pious and Charles the Bald.

Among the last names in the imperfect list of the abbots of Ferrières is that of Louis de Blanchefort, who in the 15th century almost entirely restored the abbey after it was burnt down by the English in the Hundred Years' War. He was buried in its choir.

In 1568, the abbey was besieged by the troops of Louis de Condé, Protestant friend of the Coligny family, pillaged and profaned and, although no monks were killed, the reliquaires and treasures of the abbey were dispersed, the tombs there of Louis III, Carloman II and Louis de Blanchefort heavily damaged and the monks' stalls removed. Odet de Coligny (abroad by then, and abbot of the abbey until shortly beforehand) only intervened to stop this after three days when his own financial interests in the benefice seemed threatened. After suffering this and other severe damage during the Wars of Religion, Ferrières was rebuilt in the 17th century by the prior Guillaume Morin, but then disappeared with all the ancient abbeys at the time of the French Revolution, and its treasures and library were ruined and scattered.

== Buildings ==
Today only some ruins of the ancient monastic buildings are to be seen.

At its height, the abbey occupied a vast enclosed estate with a great cloister (adjoining the monastic church to the south of its nave) and a little cloister (adjoining its choir).

The abbey church is formed of a 12th-century nave and 13th-century transepts and choir. She must have been begun around 1150. On September 29, 1163, Pope Alexander III consecrated the nave whilst it was under construction. The volume of the nave was doubled by a unique second nave to its left, destroyed in 1739 by the collapse of the crossing tower - one can also sees the great arcades linking the two, whose bases (laid out today in bricks) alternated between one big column and two doubled smaller ones (as at the collegiate church of Champeaux, at Saint-Martin de Champeaux; the doubling-up and the decoration betray the influence of Sens Cathedral). It seems there was no plan to vault the main nave, covered instead with a paneled framework. In the right wall, one notices the door (walled-up) that led into the great cloister. The windows, high up because of the cloister, are apparently contemporary with the transept and choir.

These were constructed in the first years of the 13th century. The crossing is formed by an octagonal rotonda. This very original plan was maybe imposed on the builders by the presence in this location of some foundations of a Carolingian building, sometimes identified with the choir of the church rebuilt on the orders of Aldaric, abbot from 821 to 828 - visible traces of this foundation include an arch of alternating stone and nated brick on the right rear of the rotonda. The central space is not covered by a cupola but by an arch of ribs radiating out to eight supports. Between the transept chapel and the choir is located a small room (formerly the sacristy and mortuary, where the bodies of dead monks were deposited for the day before funeral, before being placed in the choir for the funeral itself). Off the left transept opens a chapel of the 14th century, perhaps replacing a chapel similar to that off the right transept.

The choir is covered with a sexpartite (six-part) arch (a 13th-century type particular to Champagne and Burgundy). Its lateral walls present traces of an 11th-century phase of construction. In the choir is the tomb of Louis de Blanchefort.

The crossing carried a tower called a "lead steeple" (visible on the engraving of the "Monastecon gallicanum"), decorated with eight 2.5m high lead statues and the arms of Louis XIII and the prince of Condé, but destroyed in 1739. The tower steeple, to the left, is very ancient at its base; the floors were remade to in the 13th century; the arrow, at the end of the 15th.

The tympanum of the earlier door of the central nave, today in the open air, was decorated with a scene of Christ in majesty, with (some believe) Christ as a portrait of Clovis I. In the earlier door of the secondary nave was a capital representing a fight between Pepin the Short and a lion.

The glass-windows of the apse date back to the end of the 15th century and the beginning of the 16th, ordered by Louis of Blancafort or his successor Pierre de Martigny (1518-1527).

Besides the monastic church (12th and 13th centuries), the Notre-Dame de Bethléem chapel (to the west of the monastic church), in which is a retable of 1650 by Gilles Guérin, and parts of the convent were preserved, all largely dating to Louis de Blanchefort's 15th century rebuild.

== List of abbots ==
- Loup (Lupus) of Ferrières (c. 850)
- Aldric 821 to 828, Abbot before he became Archbishop of Sens
- Louis de Blanchefort, 1465 to 1507
- Pierre de Martigny, 1518-1527 (Blanchefort's successor)
- Odet de Coligny, 1556 - 1563

== See also ==
- List of Carolingian monasteries
- Carolingian art
- High medieval domes

== Notes ==
- "The Benedictine Abbey at Ferrières-en-Gâtinais has been most unfortunate from the view of historical science, having lost its archives, its charters, and everything which would aid in the reconstruction of its history. Thus legend and the existence of the abbey about the credulity have had full play. But it is interesting to encounter in the work of an obscure Benedictine of the eighteenth century, Dom Philippe Mazoyer, information perhaps the most accurate and circumspect obtainable". (Catholic Encyclopedia)
