= Sevlievo Municipality =

Sevlievo Municipality Община Севлиево
- Municipality
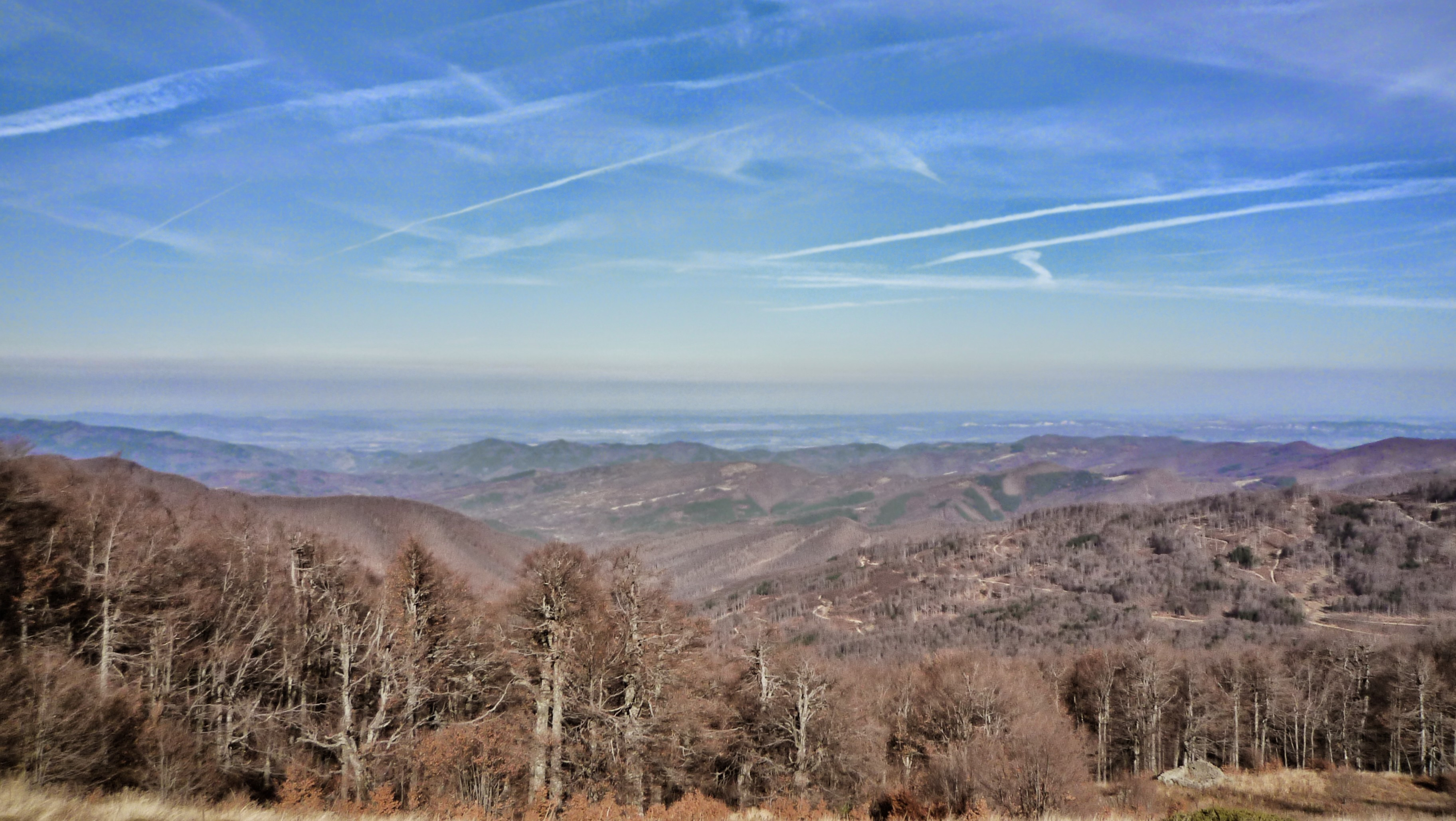

- Coat of arms

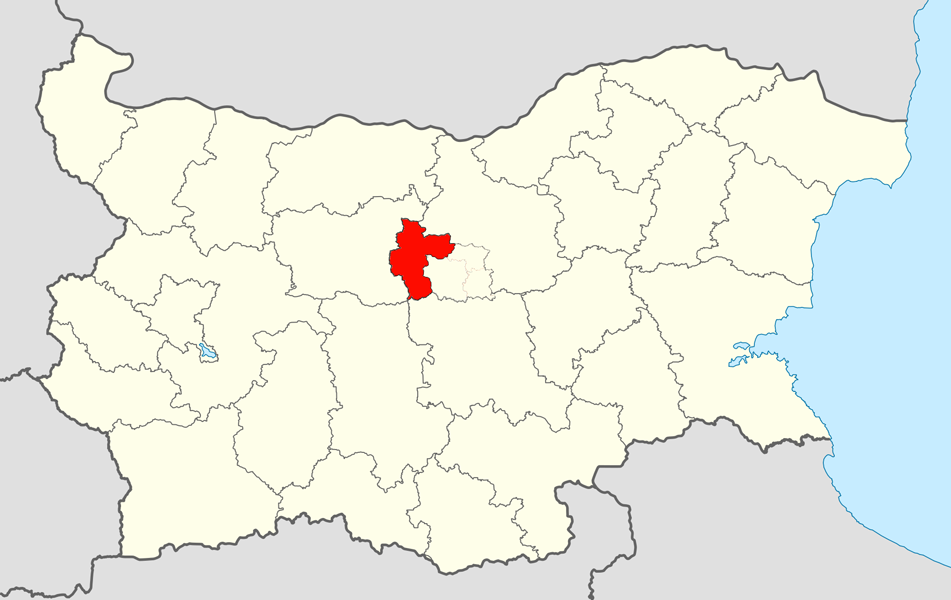
- Sevlievo Municipality within Bulgaria and Gabrovo Province.
- Coordinates: 42°59′N 25°0′E
- Country: Bulgaria
- Province (Oblast): Gabrovo
- Admin. centre (Obshtinski tsentar): Sevlievo

Area
  - Total: 1,040 km^{2} (400 sq mi)

Population (December 2009)
  - Total: 39,537
  - Density: 38.0/km^{2} (98.5/sq mi)
- Time zone: UTC+2 (EET)
  - Summer (DST): UTC+3 (EEST)

Sevlievo Municipality (Bulgarian: Община Севлиево) is a municipality (obshtina) in Gabrovo Province, North-central Bulgaria, located in the area of the so-called Fore-Balkan between Stara planina mountain and the Danubian Plain. It is named after its administrative centre - the town of Sevlievo.

The municipality embraces a territory of 1,040 km^{2} (400 sq mi) with a population of 39,537 inhabitants, as of December 2009.

The area is best known with the Batoshevski Monastery, situated close to Batoshevo village.

== Settlements ==
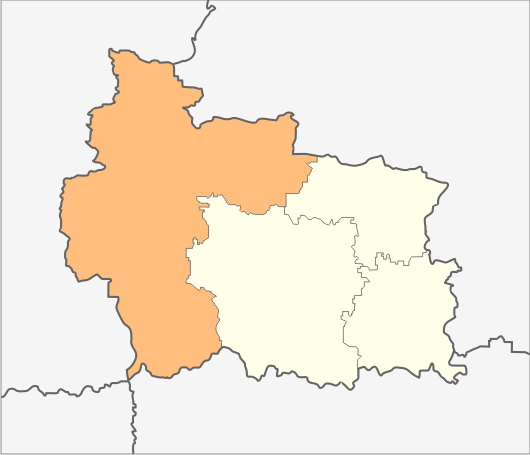
Sevlievo Municipality within Gabrovo Province

Sevlievo Municipality includes the following 50 places (towns are shown in bold):

Town/Village	Cyrillic	Population (December 2009)
**Sevlievo**	**Севлиево**	24,065
Agatovo	Агатово	442
Batoshevo	Батошево	706
Berievo	Бериево	369
Boazat	Боазът	57
Bogatovo	Богатово	422
Burya	Буря	265
Balgari	Българи	8
Damyanovo	Дамяново	556
Debeltsovo	Дебелцово	2
Dismanitsa	Дисманица	7
Dobromirka	Добромирка	677
Dushevo	Душево	1,024
Dushevski kolibi	Душевски колиби	23
Dyalak	Дялък	7
Enev rat	Енев рът	19
Gorna Rositsa	Горна Росица	642
Gradishte	Градище	209
Gradnitsa	Градница	1,246
Hirevo	Хирево	192
Idilevo	Идилево	176
Karamichevtsi	Карамичевци	45
Kastel	Кастел	54
Koriyata	Корията	12
Kormyansko	Кормянско	705
Kramolin	Крамолин	493
Krushevo	Крушево	596
Kravenik	Кръвеник	181
Kupen	Купен	31
Lovnidol	Ловнидол	345
Malinovo	Малиново	0
Malki Varshets	Малки Вършец	241
Marinovtsi	Мариновци	38
Mladen	Младен	205
Mlechevo	Млечево	100
Petko Slaveykov	Петко Славейков	1,240
Popska	Попска	38
Ryahovtsite	Ряховците	1,421
Selishte	Селище	142
Sennik	Сенник	791
Shopite	Шопите	34
Shumata	Шумата	674
Stokite	Стоките	265
Stolat	Столът	332
Tabashka	Табашка	60
Tumbalovo	Тумбалово	82
Tarhovo	Търхово	123
Ugorelets	Угорелец	49
Valevtsi	Валевци	22
Voynishka	Войнишка	62
Total		39,537

== Demography ==
The following table shows the change of the population during the last four decades. Since 1992 Sevlievo Municipality has comprised the former municipalities of Gradnitsa and Stokite and the numbers in the table reflect this unification.

Sevlievo Municipality
Year	1975	1985	1992	2001	2005	2007	2009	2011
Population	42,625	41,708	47,647	43,105	40,989	40,370	39,537	...
Sources: Census 2001, Census 2011, „pop-stat.mashke.org“,

=== Religion ===
According to the latest Bulgarian census of 2011, the religious composition, among those who answered the optional question on religious identification, was the following:

Religious composition of Sevlievo Municipality
Orthodox Christianity	73.1%
Catholicism	0.5%
Protestantism	0.6%
Islam	12.5%
No religion	3.8%
Prefer not to answer, others and indefinable	9.5%

== See also ==
- Provinces of Bulgaria
- Municipalities of Bulgaria
- List of cities and towns in Bulgaria
