= Rositsa (river) =

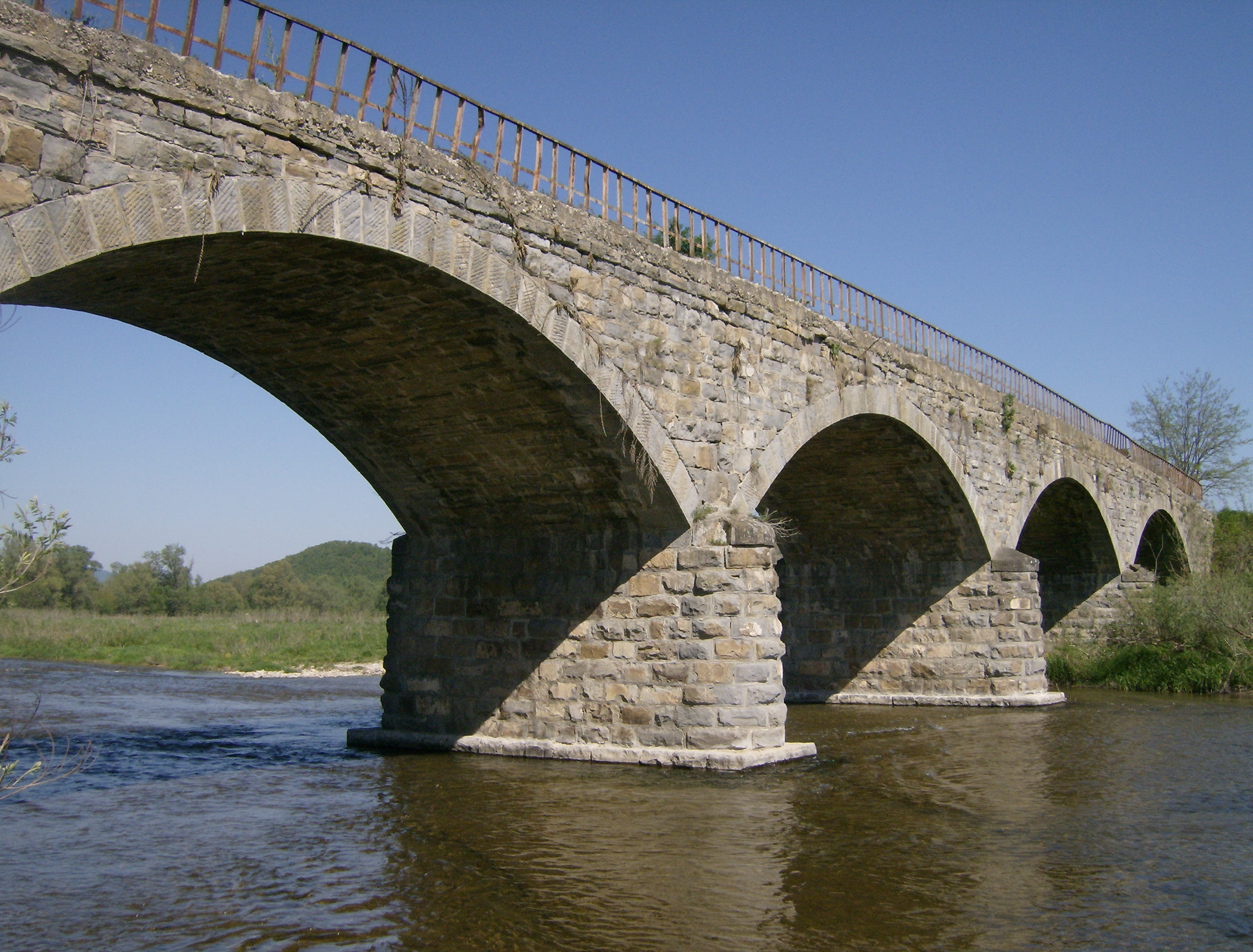
- The bridge over the Rositsa at the village of Gorna Rositsa

Location
- Country: Bulgaria

Physical characteristics
- Source
  - location: N of Mazalat, Balkan Mountains
  - coordinates: 42°45′41.04″N 25°6′57.96″E
  - elevation: 1,300 m (4,300 ft)
- Mouth
  - location: Yantra
  - coordinates: 43°14′45.96″N 25°42′28.08″E
  - elevation: 44 m (144 ft)
- Length: 146 km (91 mi)
- Basin size: 2,262 km^{2} (873 sq mi)

Basin features
- Progression: Yantra→ Danube→ Black Sea

The Rositsa (Bulgarian: Росица [roˈsit͡sɐ]) is river in northern Bulgaria, a left tributary of the river Yantra, itself a right tributary of the Danube. With a length of 164 km, it is the largest tributary of the Yantra and the 13th longest river in the country. Its ancient name was Lyginus.

== Geography ==
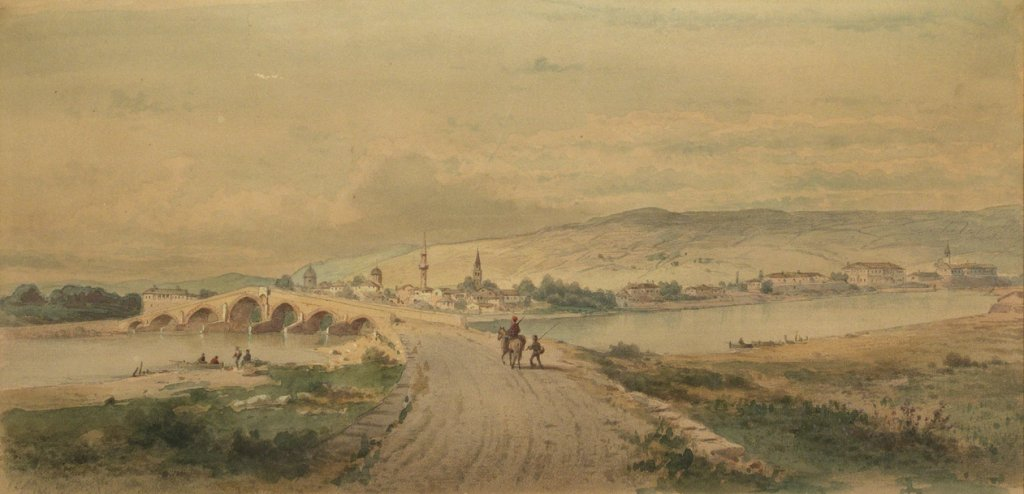
The Rositsa at Sevlievo by Felix Philipp Kanitz

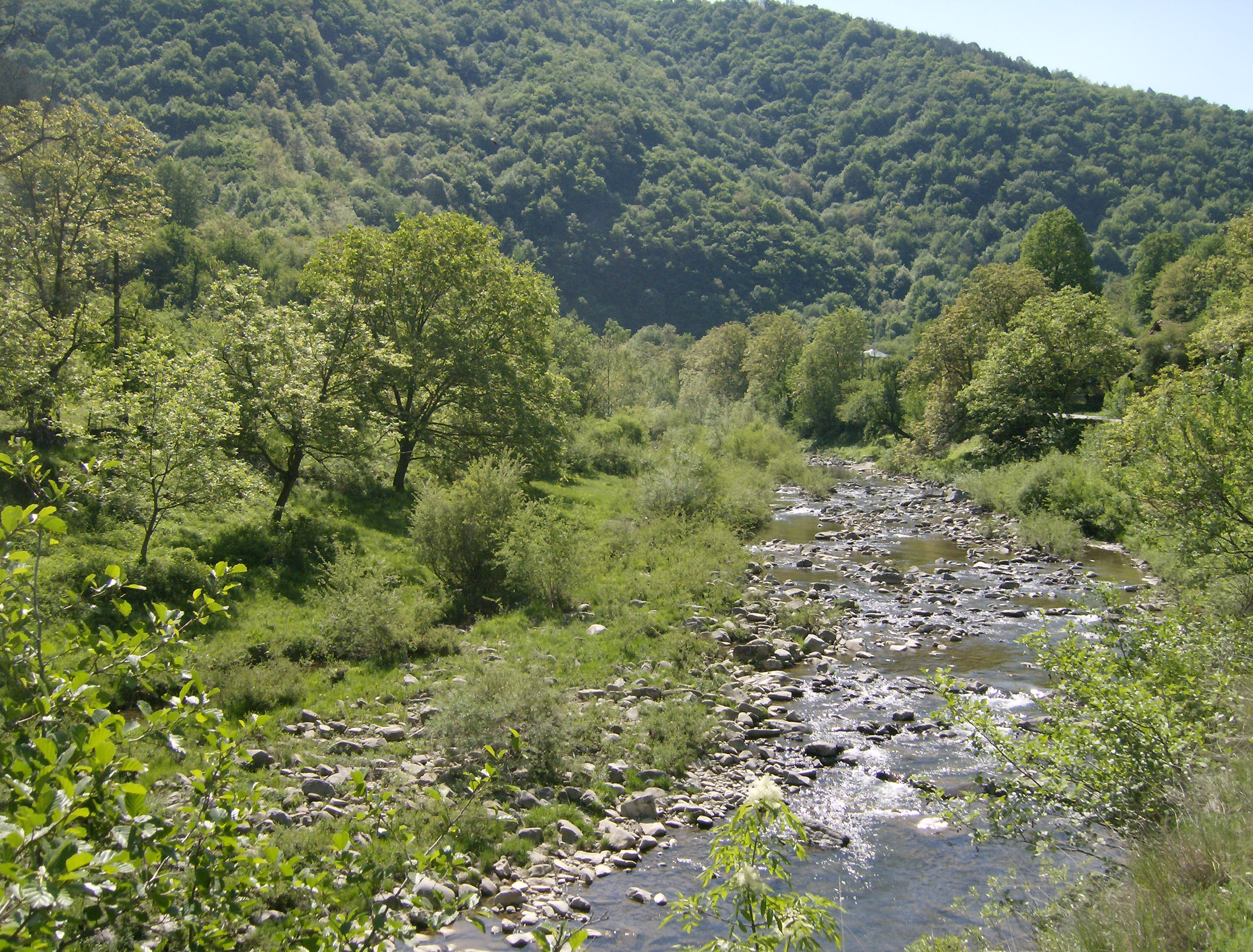
The Rositsa near Batoshevo

The Rositsa takes its source at an altitude of about 1,300 m some 300 m north of the Mazalat refuge in the Kaloferska Planina division of the Balkan Mountains. It flows northwards in a deep forested valley until the village of Batoshevo. Downstream the valley widens and after the village of Gorna Rositsa enters the Sevlievo Valley, where it runs through the homonymous town. It then crosses the Sevlievo Heights in a deep gorge between the villages of Kormyansko and Gorsko Kosovo, which has been submerged under the Aleksandar Stamboliyski Reservoir. After its outflow from the dam, the Rositsa heads northeast, and — downstream from the town of Byala Cherkva — east, flowing in a wide valley between the Pavlikeni Plateau to the north and the Tarnovo Heights to the south. That part of the valley is covered by arable land and serves as the boundary between the Danubian Plain to the north and the fore-Balkan to the south. The river flows into the Yantra at an altitude of 44 m about two kilometers east of the village of Krusheto.

Its drainage basin covers a territory of 2,262 km^{2} or 28.8% of the Yantra's total. It borders the basins of the Osam to the west and northwest, of several smaller tributaries of the Yantra to the north, east and northeast, and the Maritsa to the south along the main watershed along the Balkan Mountains. The largest of the Rositsa tributaries are the Vidima (68 km, left), the Negovanka (46 km, rights) and the Bohoy (32 km, right).

The Rositsa has a mixed feed on snow, rain and underground karst water, the latter in the fore-Balkan. The river features significant seasonal variations. High water is in April–June and low water is in September. About 70–80% of the annual discharge flows in spring, and only 9–10% flows in summer and autumn. The average annual discharge is 10.6 m^{3}/s at Sevlievo in its middle course and 12.3 m^{3}/s at Vodoley. The river is prone to floods and its low left bank is corrected with protective dikes throughout its course through the Danubian Plain.

== Settlements and landmarks ==
The river flows in Gabrovo and Veliko Tarnovo Provinces. There are two towns and 17 villages along its course: Ugorelets, Valevtsi, Tumbalovo, Stokite, Popska, Karamichevtsi, Batoshevo, Gorna Rositsa and Sevlievo (town) in Gabrovo Province, and Gorsko Kosovo, Krasno Gradishte, Rositsa, Byala Cherkva (town), Stambolovo, Lesicheri, Dichin, Vodoley and Resen in Veliko Tarnovo Province. Its waters in the middle and the lower course are utilized for irrigation, regulated via the Aleksandar Stamboliyski Reservoir. The small Rositsa Hydro Power Station is an installed capacity of 11 MW is located at the reservoir's dam.

In its upper valley are located the Batoshevo Monastery of Nativity of the Virgin and the Batoshevo Monastery of the Presentation of Mary. In Sevlievo is located a 19th-century stone bridge constructed by the Bulgarian National Revival architect Kolyu Ficheto. Some 9 km before the confluence with the Yantra near the village of Nikyup are the ruins of the ancient Roman town Nicopolis ad Istrum, founded by in the 2nd century AD Emperor Trajan.

== Gallery ==
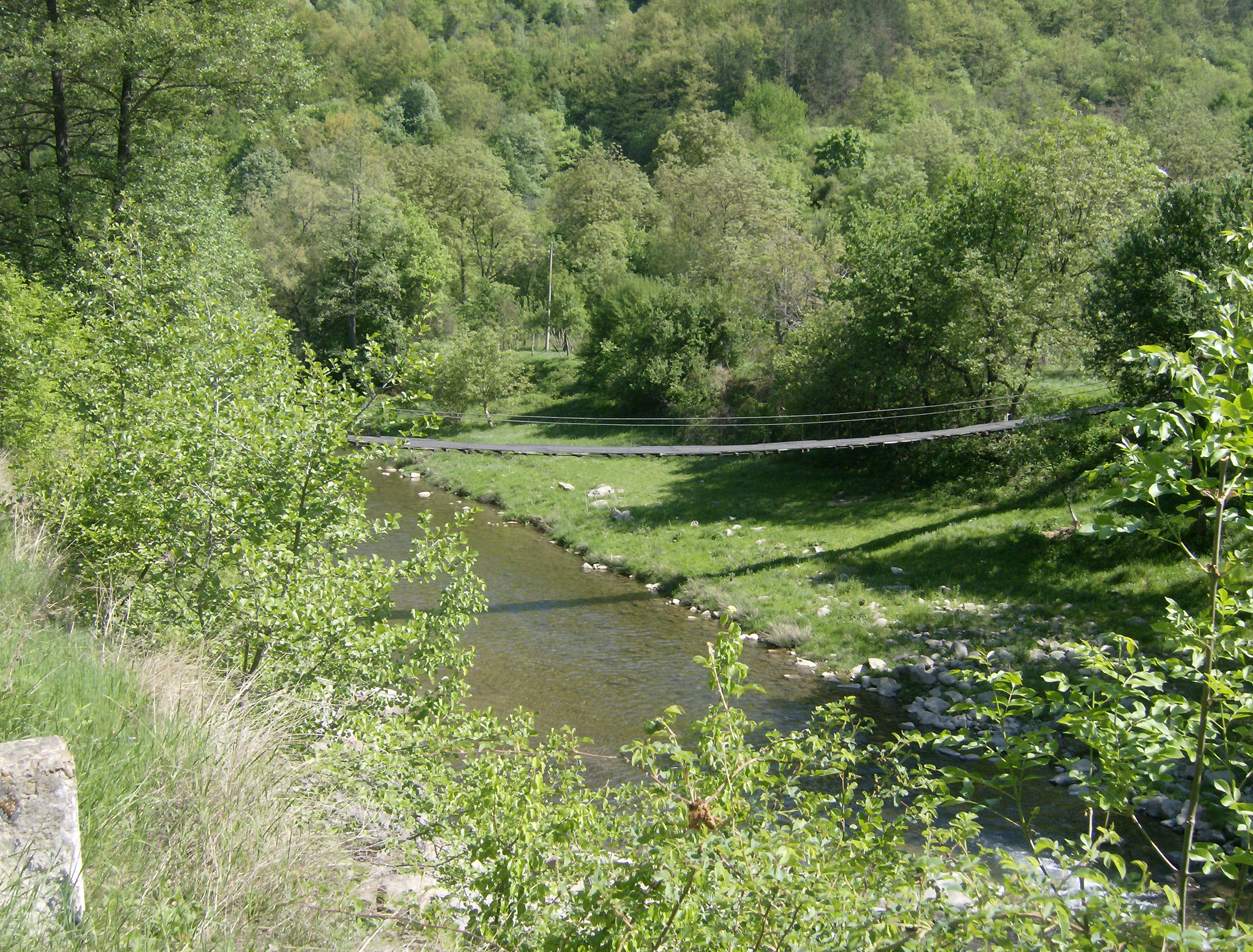
The river near Batoshevo

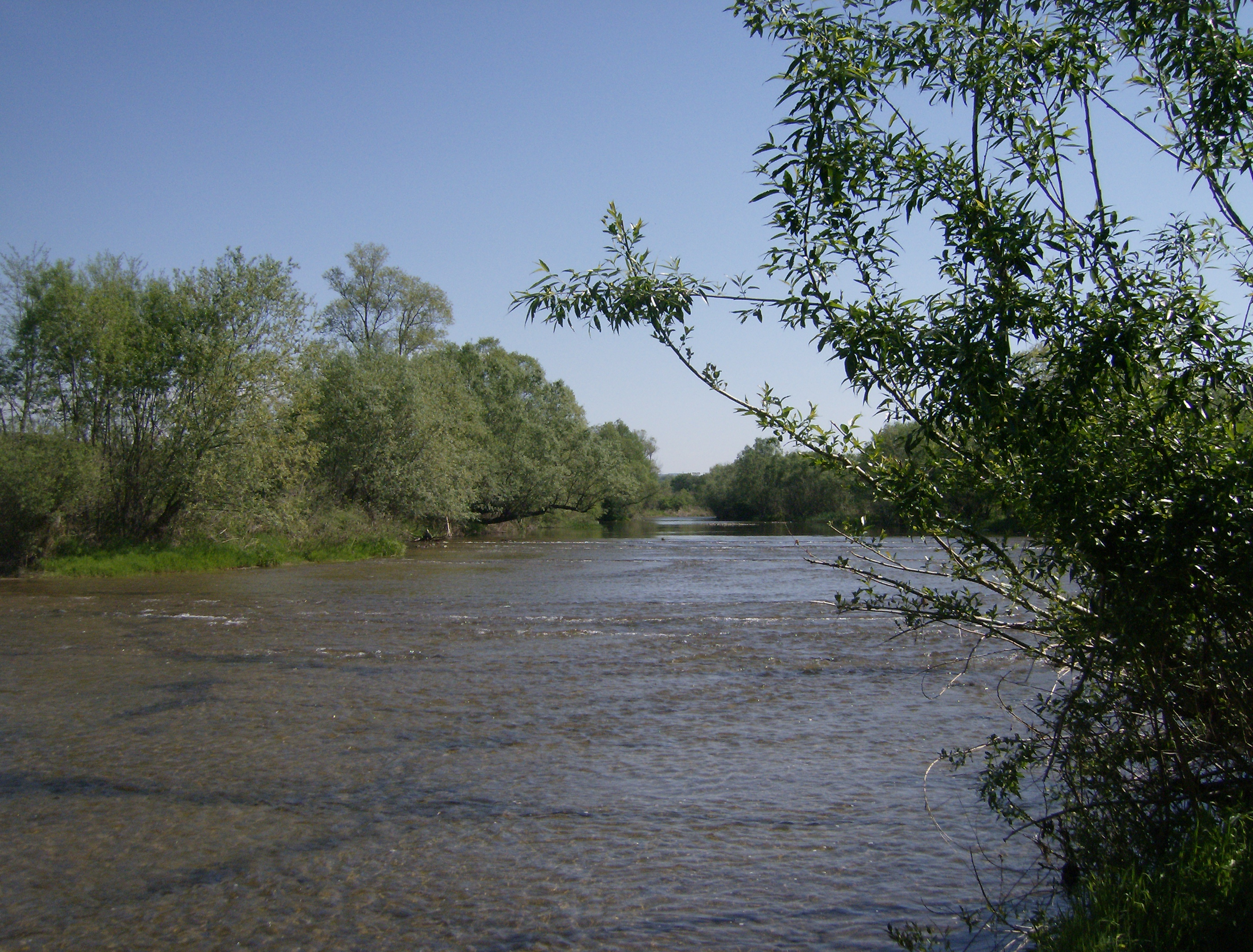
The river near Gorna Rositsa

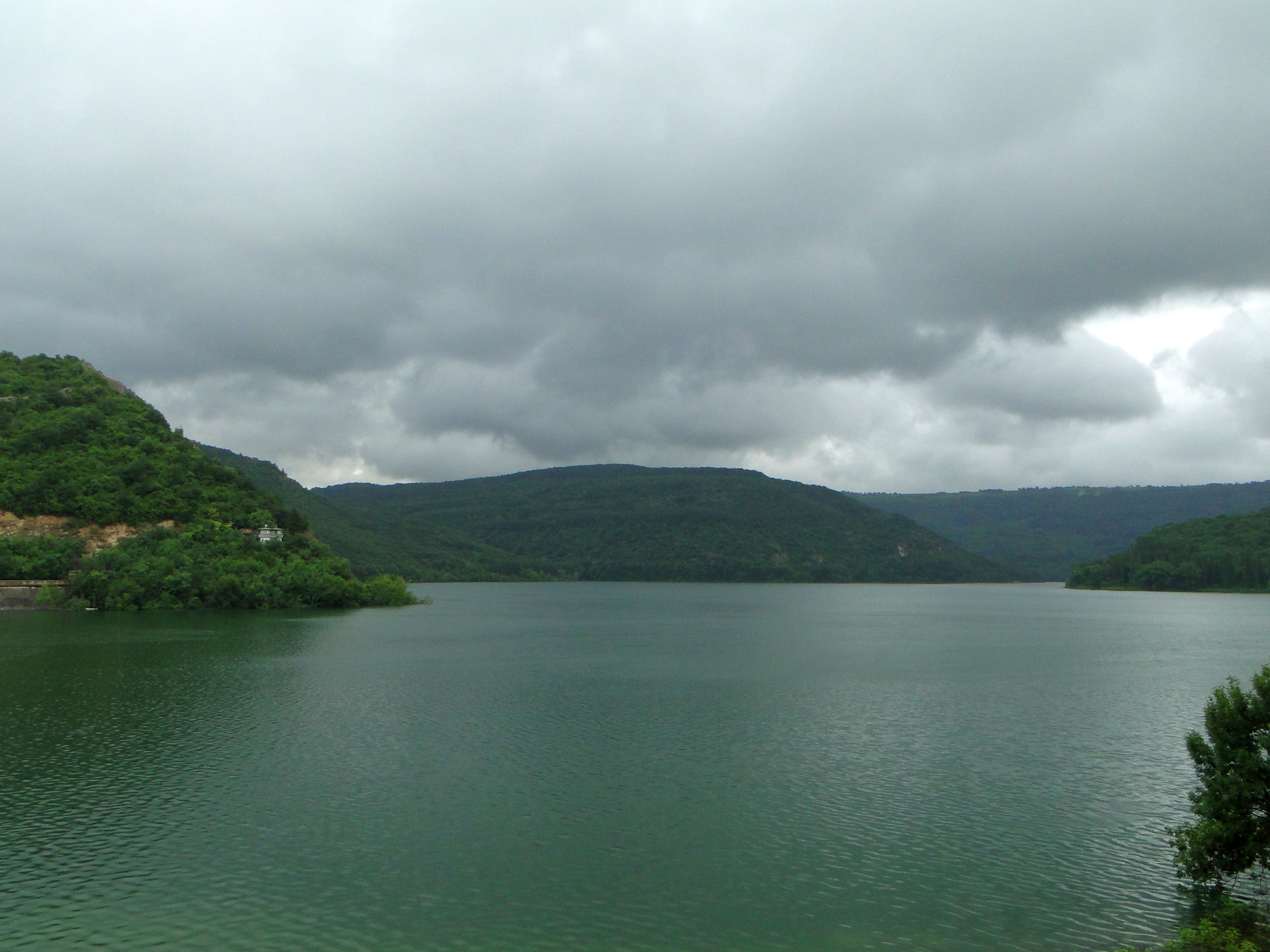
Aleksandar Stamboliyski Reservoir

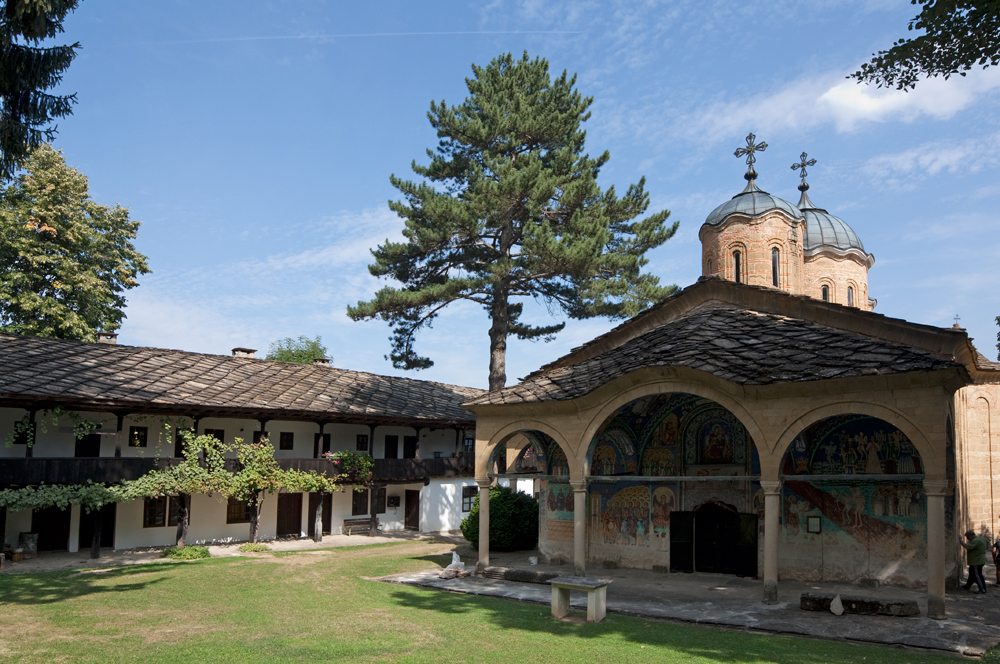
Batoshevo Monastery
