= Selište =

Selište, which translates as Settlement in Serbo-Croatian, may refer to several places:

== Bosnia and Herzegovina ==
- Selište, Fojnica, village in the Fojnica municipality
- Selište, Jajce, village in the Jajce municipality
- Selište, Mostar, village in the Mostar municipality
- Selište, Šekovići, village in the Šekovići municipality
- Selište, Srbac, village in the Srbac municipality
- Selište, Žepče, village in the Žepče municipality

== Croatia ==
- Selište, Croatia, village in the Kutina municipality

== Montenegro ==
- Selište, Montenegro, village in the Podgorica municipality

== Serbia ==
- Selište, Kuršumlija, village in the Kuršumlija municipality
- Selište, Prokuplje, village in the Prokuplje municipality
- Selište (Trstenik), village in the Trstenik municipality

== See also ==
- Selishte (disambiguation)
- Selišta (disambiguation)
- Selişte (disambiguation)
- Selišta (disambiguation)
- Selishtë, Albania
