= Kastel =

Kastel may refer to:

- Kastel, a village in Sevlievo Municipality, Gabrovo Province, Bulgaria.
- Kaštel, a village in Istria County, Croatia
- Kaštela, Split-Dalmatia County, Croatia
- Mainz-Kastel, district of Wiesbaden, formerly the city of Kastel until its incorporation into Wiesbaden, Germany on August 10, 1945
- Al-Qastal, an Arab village and strategic point in the 1948 Arab-Israeli war
