= Tsanko Dyustabanov =

Bulgarian revolutionary (1844–1876)

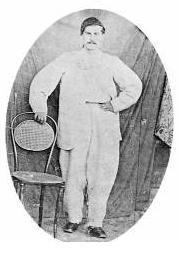
Tsanko Dyustabanov.

Tsanko Hristov Dyustabanov (Bulgarian: Цанко Христов Дюстабанов; (May 13, 1844 – June 15, 1876) was a Bulgarian revolutionary and participant in the April uprising of 1876.

Dyustabanov was born in Gabrovo in today's Bulgaria, which was then part of the Ottoman Empire. He attended the Gabrovo School and was fluent in French and Turkish, he later studied at Robert College in Istanbul in 1872-1873.

Though not a supporter of the revolutionary campaign in the struggle for national liberation, Dyustabanov gradually became active in the social and political life of Gabrovo. In 1875, he was elected trustee of the school and member of the District court. As such he organized a petition to the Ottoman government with demands such as the recognition of the Bulgarian language as a second official language in the empire alongside Turkish.

Dyustabanov joined the local revolutionary committee and assisted the preparation of the April Uprising of 1876. He led a cheta (detachment) when the uprising broke out and fought with Ottoman posses in the regions of Batoshevo, Kravenik and Novo Selo. He was seriously wounded and arrested. Dyustabanov was sentenced to death and hanged in Veliko Tarnovo June 15, 1876.
