= Selishte =

Selishte may refer to:

- Selishte, Gabrovo Province, a village in the municipality of Sevlievo, in Gabrovo Province, Bulgaria.
- Selishte, Blagoevgrad Province, a village in the municipality of Blagoevgrad, in Blagoevgrad Province, Bulgaria.
- Selishtë, a municipality in Albania

== See also ==
- Seliște (disambiguation)
- Selišta (disambiguation)
- Selište (disambiguation)
