= Dobromirka, Bulgaria =

Dobromirka Добромирка
- Village
- Location in Bulgaria
- Coordinates: 43.083°N 25.267°E
- Country: Bulgaria
- Province: Gabrovo Province
- Municipality: Sevlievo

Area
  - Total: 42.247 km^{2} (16.312 sq mi)
- Elevation: 463 m (1,519 ft)

Population (2015)
  - Total: 626
- Time zone: UTC+2 (EET)
  - Summer (DST): UTC+3 (EEST)

Dobromirka (Bulgarian: Добромирка) is a village located in a valley between Sevlievo and Veliko Tarnovo in Gabrovo Province, Sevlievo Municipality. It is situated in central Bulgaria.

== Geography ==
Dobromirka has an elevation of between 463 m above sea level. There are views of Botev Peak, the highest in the Balkan Mountains from the hills around the village. Maximum July temperatures are 41 whilst minimum winter temp is -29 degrees.

== People ==
In 2001, according to the census, Dobromirka had a population of 670. By the time of the 2011 census the number of inhabitants had been reduced to 450.

Dobromirka is the birthplace of the poet Penyo Penev and tenor Christo Bajew (Baev).

== Economy and infrastructure ==
The majority of inhabitants work in agriculture, whilst a few commute via bus routes to Sevlievo or Veliko Tarnavo. Since 2007, there has been an increasing number of British people who have purchased holiday homes or have moved to the area to live, contributing to the local economy. The village is served by a school, bakery and bar.
