= Selišta =

Selišta may refer to:

== Bosnia and Herzegovina ==
- Selišta, Berkovići, a settlement in Berkovići municipality, Republika Srpska
- Selišta, Bileća, Republika Srpska
- Selišta, Sokolac, Republika Srpska

== Montenegro ==
- Selišta, Kolašin
- Selišta, Pljevlja

== See also ==
- Selište (disambiguation)
- Seliște (disambiguation)
