= Veliko Tarnovo Municipality =

Veliko Tarnovo Municipality Община Велико Търново
- Municipality
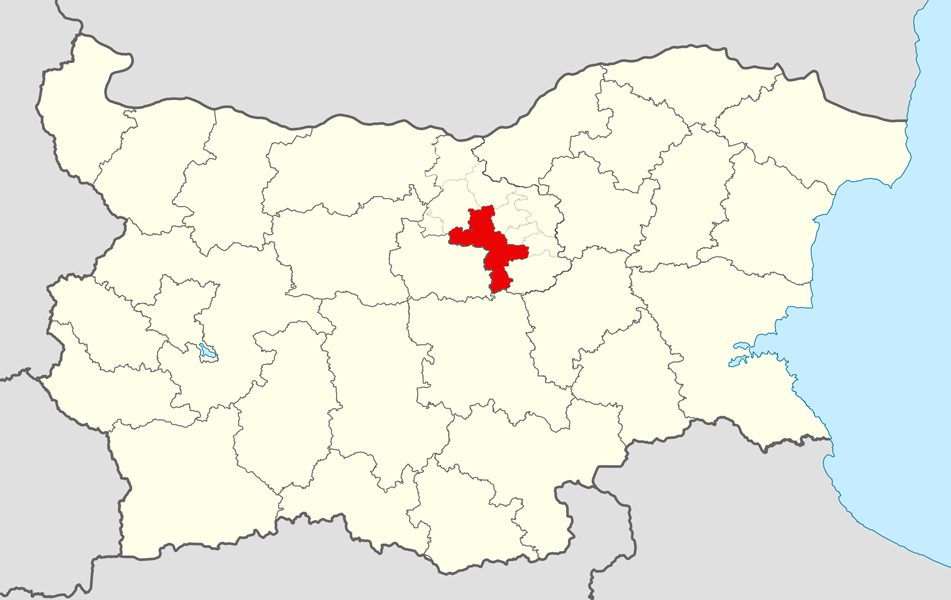
- Veliko Tarnovo Municipality within Bulgaria and Veliko Tarnovo Province.
- Coordinates: 43°2′N 25°38′E
- Country: Bulgaria
- Province (Oblast): Veliko Tarnovo
- Admin. centre (Obshtinski tsentar): Veliko Tarnovo

Area
  - Total: 883 km^{2} (341 sq mi)

Population (December 2009)
  - Total: 88,724
  - Density: 100/km^{2} (260/sq mi)
- Time zone: UTC+2 (EET)
  - Summer (DST): UTC+3 (EEST)

Veliko Tarnovo Municipality (Bulgarian: Община Велико Търново) is a municipality (obshtina) in Veliko Tarnovo Province, Central-North Bulgaria, located mostly in the so-called Fore-Balkan area north of Stara planina mountain. It is named after its administrative centre - the old capital of the country, the city of Veliko Tarnovo which is also the main town of the province.

The municipality embraces a territory of 883 km^{2} (341 sq mi) with a population of 88,724 inhabitants, as of December 2009.

The area is a crossroads of two of the major transport corridors in Bulgaria - road E772 which connects the capital of Sofia with the port of Varna and road E85 which connects the city of Ruse on Danube river with Shipka pass. The Hemus motorway is planned to cross the municipality north of its main town.

== Settlements ==
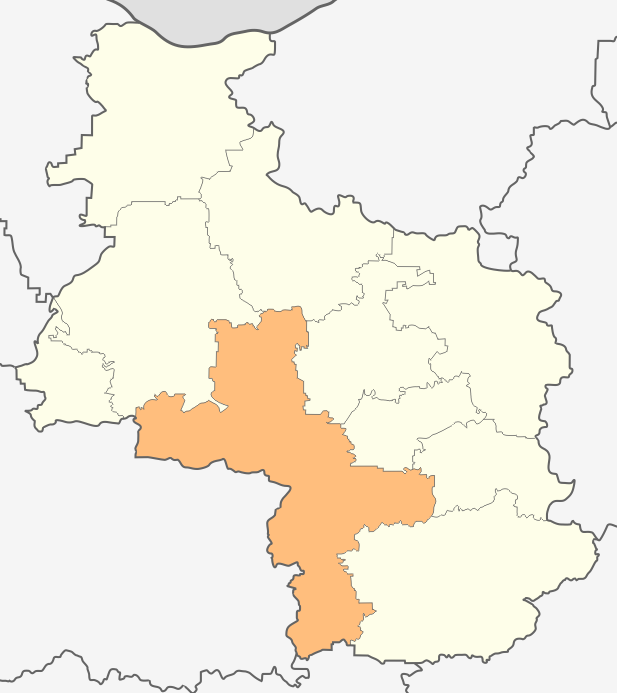
Veliko Tarnovo Municipality within Veliko Tarnovo Province

(towns are shown in bold): Population (December 2009)

- **Veliko Tarnovo** - **Велико Търново** - 67,099
- Arbanasi - Арбанаси -
- Balvan - Балван -
- Belyakovets - Беляковец -
- Bizhovtsi - Бижовци -
- Boychevi Kolibi - Бойчеви колиби -
- Boychovtsi - Бойчовци -
- Bochkovtsi - Бочковци -
- Boyanovtsi - Бояновци -
- Bukovets - Буковец -
- **Debelets** - **Дебелец** -
- Devetatsite - Деветаците -
- Dechkovtsi - Дечковци -
- Dimitrovtsi - Димитровци -
- Dimovtsi - Димовци -
- Dichin - Дичин -
- Dolen Enevets - Долен Еневец -
- Dolni Damyanovtsi - Долни Дамяновци -
- Dunavtsi - Дунавци -
- Emen - Емен -
- Gabrovtsi - Габровци -
- Gashtevtsi - Гащевци -
- Golemanite - Големаните -
- Goranovtsi - Горановци -
- Goren Enevets - Горен Еневец -
- Hotnitsa - Хотница -
- Ivanovtsi - Ивановци -
- Ilevtsi - Илевци -
- Kapinovo - Къпиново -
- **Kilifarevo** - **Килифарево** -
- Kisyovtsi - Кисьовци -
- Kladni Dyal - Кладни дял -
- Klashka Reka - Клъшка река -
- Lagerite - Лагерите -
- Ledenik - Леденик -
- Malki Chiflik - Малки Чифлик -
- Malchovtsi - Малчовци -
- Mindya - Миндя -
- Mishemorkov Han - Мишеморков хан -
- Momin Sbor - Момин сбор -
- Natsovtsi - Нацовци -
- Nikyup - Никюп -
- Novo Selo - Ново село -
- Piramidata - Пирамидата -
- Plakovo - Плаково -
- Pozhernik - Пожерник -
- Popovtsi - Поповци -
- Prisovo - Присово -
- Prodanovtsi - Продановци -
- Pushevo - Пушево -
- Pchelishte - Пчелище -
- Parovtsi - Пъровци -
- Radkovtsi - Радковци -
- Raykovtsi - Райковци -
- Resen - Ресен -
- Rusalya - Русаля -
- Samovodene - Самоводене -
- Samsiite - Самсиите -
- Seymenite - Сеймените -
- Semkovtsi - Семковци -
- Suha Reka - Суха река -
- Sarnentsi - Сърненци -
- Sheremetya - Шереметя -
- Shodekovtsi - Шодековци -
- Shemshevo - Шемшево -
- Terziite - Терзиите -
- Todorovtsi - Тодоровци -
- Tserova Koriya - Церова кория -
- Velchevo - Велчево -
- Vetrintsi - Ветринци -
- Vilare - Виларе -
- Vodoley - Водолей -
- Voynezha - Войнежа -
- Voneshta Voda - Вонеща вода -
- Vaglevtsi - Въглевци -
- Varlinka - Върлинка -
- Yalovo - Ялово -
- Yovchebtsi - Йовчевци -

== Demography ==
The following table shows the change of the population during the last four decades. Since 1992 Veliko Tarnovo Municipality has comprised the former municipality of Kilifarevo and the numbers in the table reflect this unification.

Veliko Tarnovo Municipality
Year	1975	1985	1992	2001	2005	2007	2009	2011
Population	85,233	93,219	93,796	90,504	88,854	88,661	88,724	88,670
Sources: Census 2001, Census 2011, „pop-stat.mashke.org“,

=== Ethnic composition ===
According to the 2011 census, among those who answered the optional question on ethnic identification, the ethnic composition of the municipality was the following:

Ethnic group	Population	Percentage
Bulgarians	75570	93.9%
Turks	3681	4.6%
Roma (Gypsy)	595	0.7%
Other	350	0.4%
Undeclared	313	0.4%

==== Religion ====
According to the latest Bulgarian census of 2011, the religious composition, among those who answered the optional question on religious identification, was the following:

Religious composition of Veliko Tarnovo Municipality
Orthodox Christianity	83.8%
Catholicism	0.6%
Protestantism	0.7%
Islam	3.6%
No religion	4.8%
Prefer not to answer, others and indefinable	6.5%

An overwhelming majority of the population of Veliko Tarnovo Municipality identify themselves as Christians. At the 2011 census, 83.8% of respondents identified as Orthodox Christians belonging to the Bulgarian Orthodox Church.

== See also ==
- Provinces of Bulgaria
- Municipalities of Bulgaria
- List of cities and towns in Bulgaria
