= Burya (disambiguation) =

Burya can refer to:

- Burya, a Russian cruise missile
- Burya (village), a village in Bulgaria
- Burya Point, a rocky point in Antarctica
- Burya, a Ukrainian-Canadian band founded by Ron Cahute
