= Malinovo =

Malinovo refers to the following places:

- Malinovo, Gabrovo Province, village in Bulgaria
- Malinovo, Lovech Province, village in Bulgaria
- Malinovo, Slovakia, village in Slovakia
