= Slaveykov =

Slaveykov (Bulgarian: Славейков) may refer to:

- Petko Slaveykov (1827–1895), Bulgarian poet and publicist
- Pencho Slaveykov (1866–1912), Bulgarian poet, son of Petko
- Slaveykov Peak, mountain on Smith Island (South Shetland Islands)
- Slaveykov Square, square in Sofia
- Petko Slaveykov (village), village in Gabrovo Province
