= Gradnitsa =

Gradnitsa may refer to the following places in Bulgaria:

- Gradnitsa, Dobrich Province
- Gradnitsa, Gabrovo Province
