= Hotalich (fortress) =

- Bulgaria
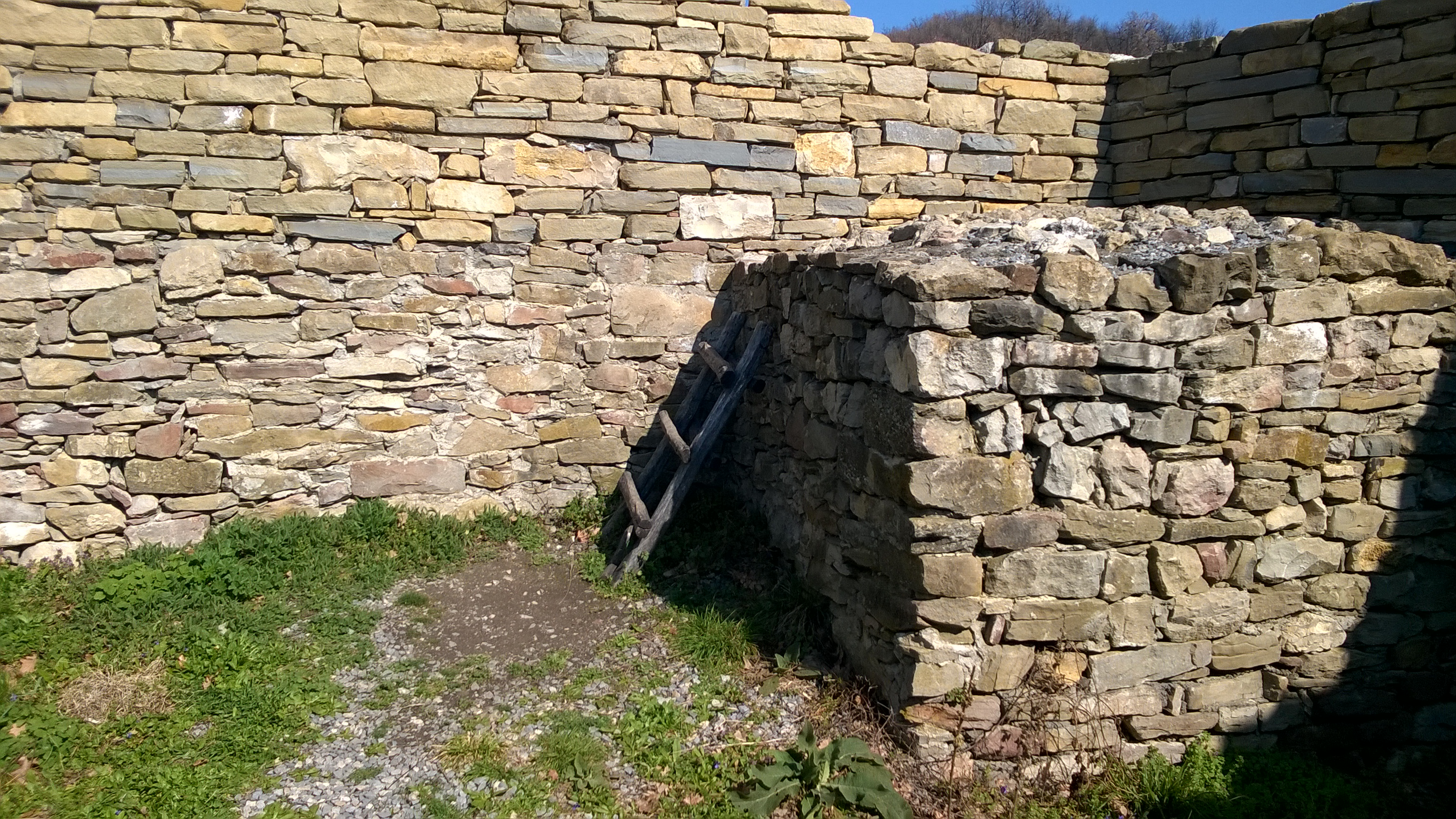

Hotalich (Bulgarian: Хоталич) is a medieval stronghold located on a hill located 4 km from in Sevlievo in northern Bulgaria. The fortress is early Byzantine, later it became a strategic fortress of the Second Bulgarian Empire. Four churches have been discovered.

== Gallery ==
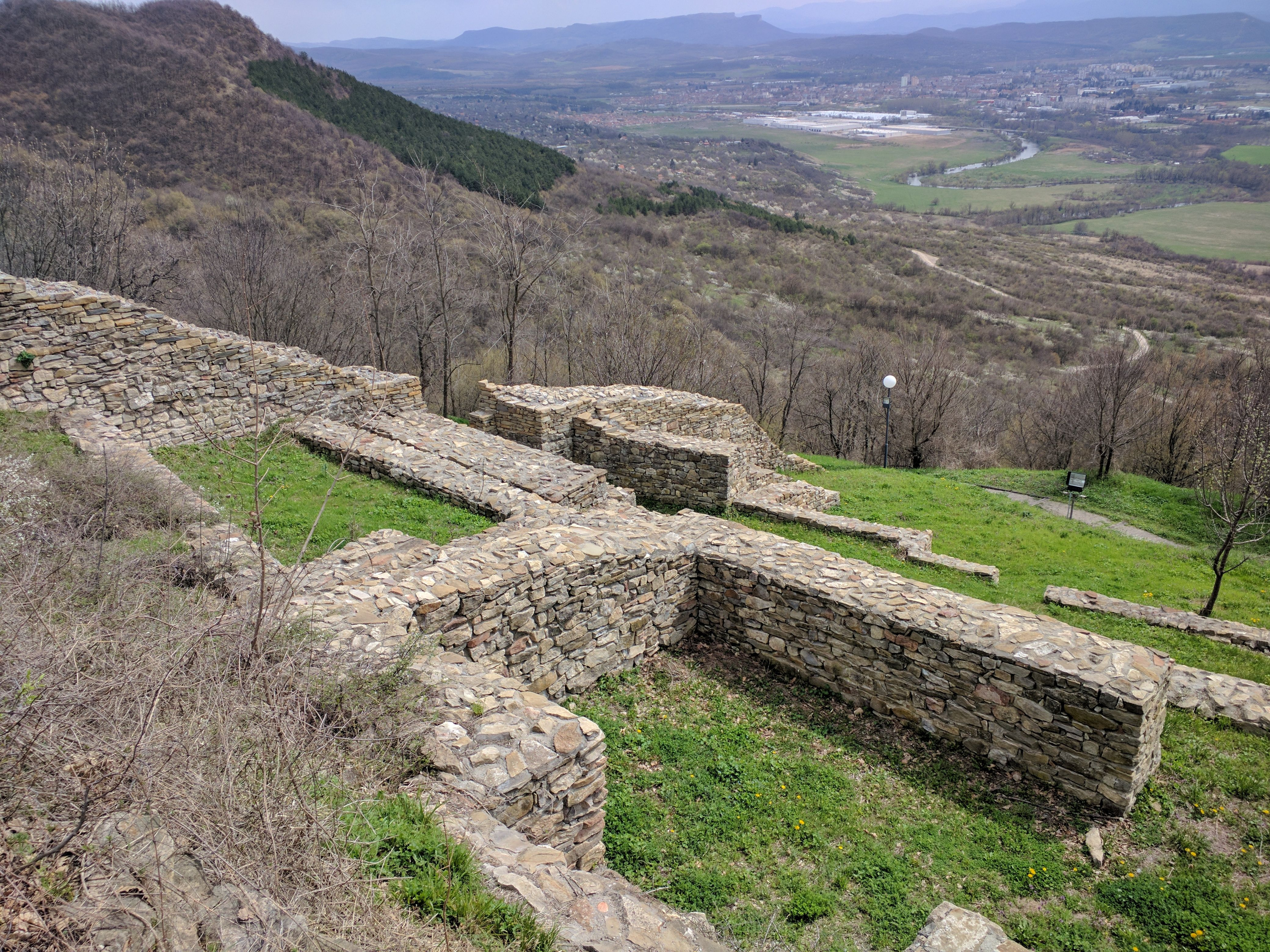

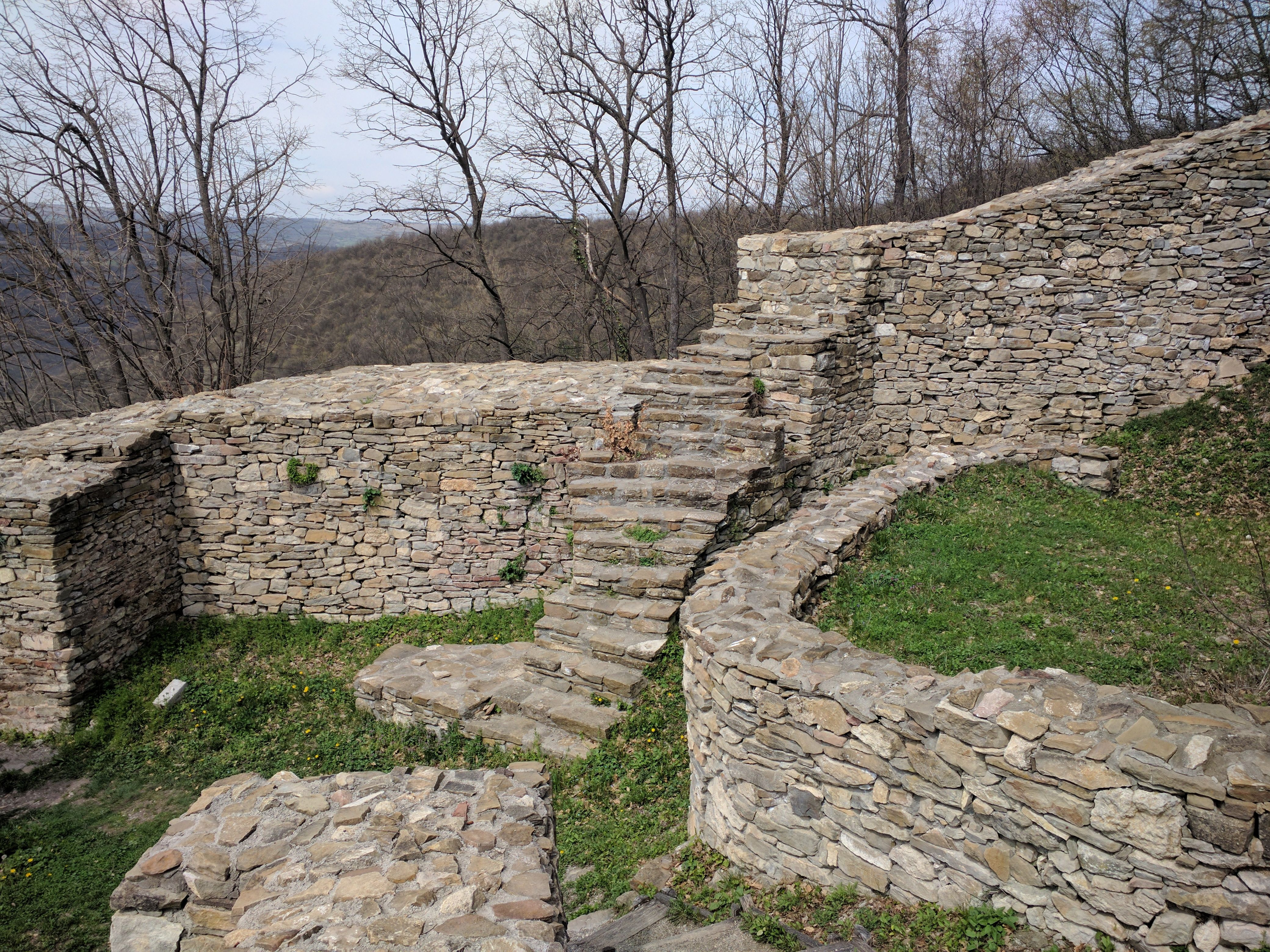

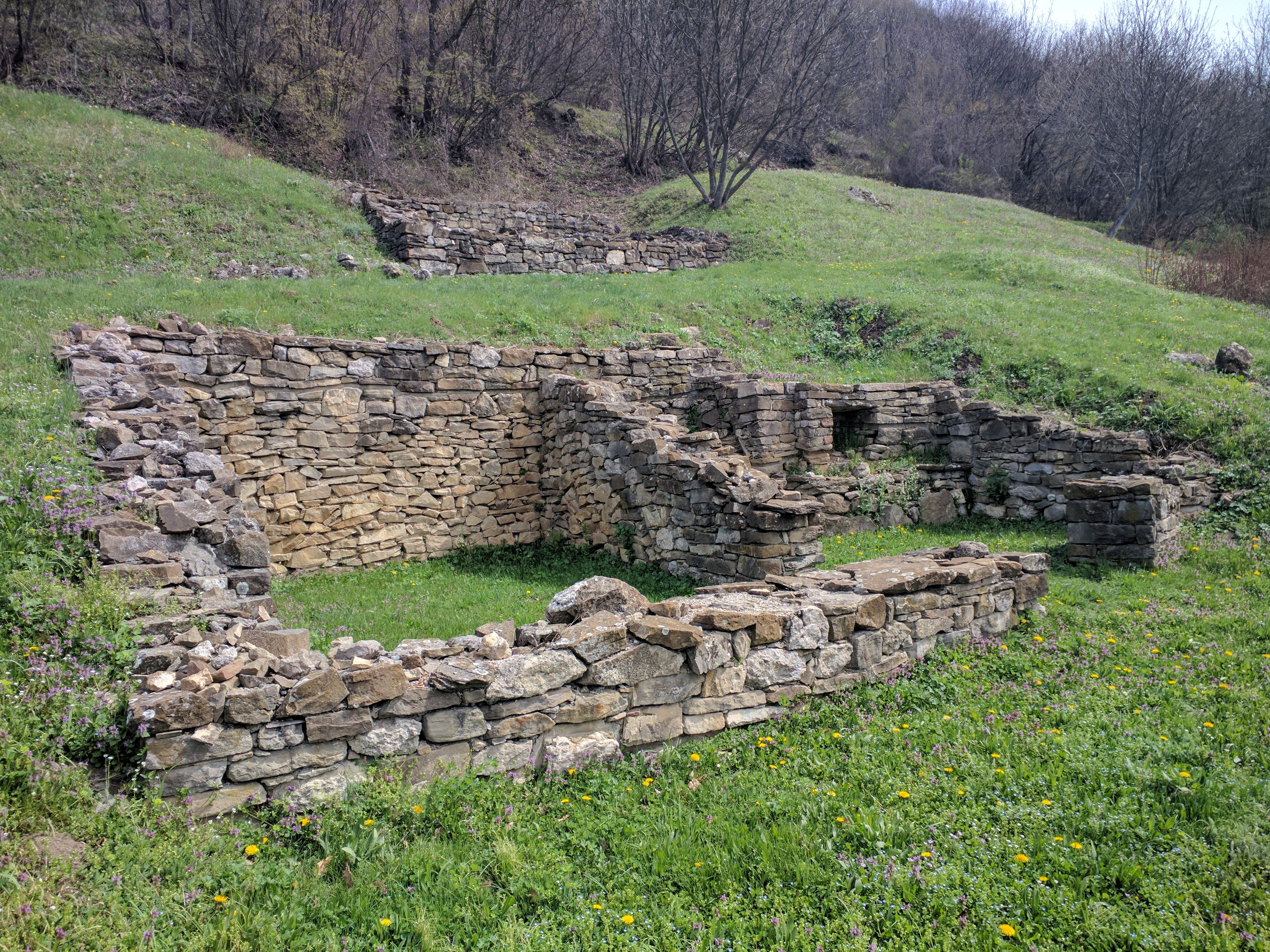
