= Resen, Veliko Tarnovo Province =

Village in Veliko Tarnovo Municipality, Bulgaria

Coordinates: 43°12′N 25°33′E

Resen (Bulgarian: Peceн) is a large village in Veliko Tarnovo Municipality, Bulgaria, located about 20 kilometers north of the university town of Veliko Tarnovo, just south of the River Rositsa.

Resen has a few local bars, shops and a typical Bulgarian cafe. In summer 2007 the village centre underwent extensive improvements, including a children's play area, a supermarket, and to the church. The village is served with broadband Internet access via a wireless network from the village Post Office, and also now available is wired (5G) internet.

Several families from other countries have bought and renovated properties in the village, and a guest house called Resen Lodge was working for several years but is now a private residence. Resen has a lady Mayor who is very good at keeping the village clean and tidy, she does organise volentary cleaning parties around the village. There is a primary age school, pharmacy, chemmist, local supermarkets, doctor and even a football team. The roads are good and even has a bus regular service.
