= Dichin =

Dichin Дичин
- Village
- Location within Bulgaria
- Coordinates: 43°13′00″N 25°28′40″E
- Country: Bulgaria
- Province: Veliko Tarnovo
- Community: Veliko Tarnovo

Area
  - Total: 20,483 km^{2} (7,909 sq mi)
- Elevation: 77 m (253 ft)

Population
  - Total: 225
- Time zone: UTC+2 (EET)
  - Summer (DST): UTC+3 (EEST)
- Post code: 5059
- Area code: 06119

Dichin (Bulgarian: Дичин) is a village in central northern Bulgaria, located about 25 kilometres north of the old university town of Veliko Tarnovo, just north of the Rositsa River, in the southern little hill part.

== Geography ==
It is located in Veliko Tarnovo Municipality.

== History ==
Near Dichin passed a water canal from the river Rositsa to the ancient Roman city Nicopolis ad Istrum. Cooperation "Saglasie" was established in 1925.

== Culture ==
- Communication center "Zora 1873" founders of the culture center were Matey Preobrajenski, the teacher Vasil Nedelchev and priest pop Petar Draganov.

== Religion ==
The Orthodox Church "Sveta Paraskeva" (Saint Paraskeva) was built in 1843.

== Economy ==
From 1948 to 1991 in the village were existed Labour Cooperative farm "Parvi mai" (First May). From 1934 to 1987 in Dichin existed the ceramics factory "Nacho Ivanov".

- Mill Brother Damyanovi (founded in 1905)
