= Gradishte, Gabrovo Province =

Gradishte
- Village
- Location in Bulgaria
- Coordinates: 43°05′45″N 25°00′50″E
- Country: Bulgaria
- Province: Gabrovo Province
- Municipality: Sevlievo
- Time zone: UTC+2 (EET)
  - Summer (DST): UTC+3 (EEST)

Gradishte is a village in Northern Bulgaria. It is located in the municipality of Gabrovo, Gabrovo region.
