= Bukovets, Veliko Tarnovo Province =

Coordinates: 43°03′N 25°29′E

Bukovets (Буковец) is a village in Veliko Tarnovo Municipality, Veliko Tarnovo Province, Bulgaria. Bukovets's population is about 52 people.
