= Vodoley =

Village in Veliko Tarnovo oblast, Bulgaria

Coordinates: 43°13′00″N 25°31′00″E

Vodoley (Bulgarian: Водолей) is a village in Veliko Tarnovo Municipality in central northern Bulgaria. It is located about 20 kilometers north of the old university town of Veliko Tarnovo, just north of the Rositsa River, in the southern little hill part.
