= Kupen, Gabrovo Province =

Kupen
- Village
- Location in Bulgaria
- Coordinates: 42.851°N 25.114°E
- Country: Bulgaria
- Province: Gabrovo Province
- Municipality: Sevlievo

Government
  - Mayor: Venzislav Rusev (GERB)
- Time zone: UTC+2 (EET)
  - Summer (DST): UTC+3 (EEST)

Kupen is a village in the municipality of Sevlievo, in Gabrovo Province, in northern central Bulgaria.
