= Selișteni =

Selișteni may refer to:

- Selișteni, a village in Husnicioara Commune, Mehedinți County, Romania
- Selișteni, a village in Valea-Trestieni Commune, Nisporeni district, Moldova

== See also ==
- Seliște (disambiguation)
