= Sevlievo Knoll =

Hill in Antarctica

Coordinates: 62°46′05.7″S 61°15′08.8″W

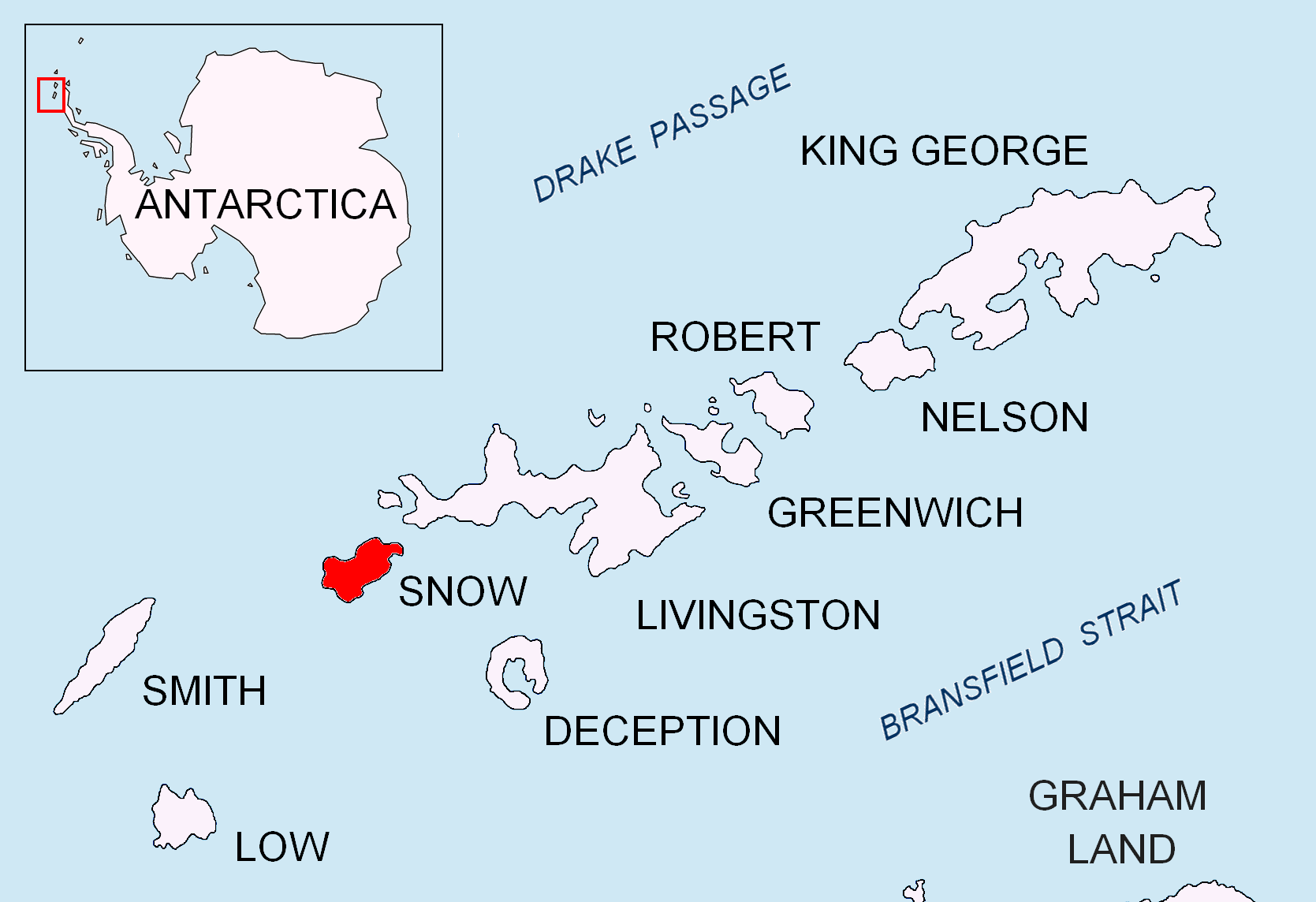
Location of Snow Island in the South Shetland Islands

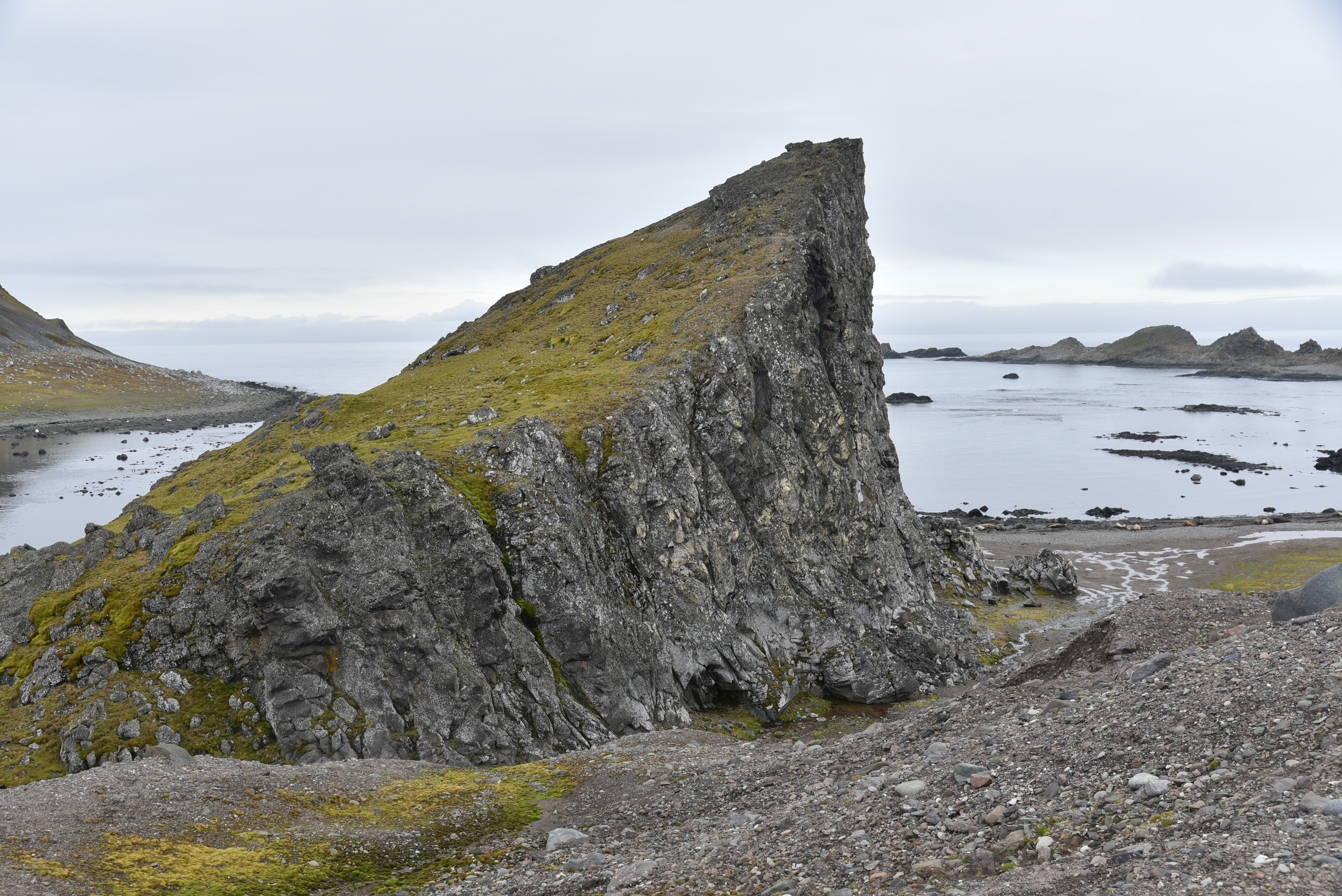
Sevlievo Knoll on Hall Peninsula, Snow Island in the South Shetland Islands

Topographic map of Livingston Island, Greenwich, Robert, Snow and Smith Islands

Sevlievo Knoll (Bulgarian: Севлиевска могила, ‘Sevlievska mogila’ \ sɛ'vliɛfskɐ mo-'gi-lɐ\) is the rocky hill rising to 25 m on the small ice-free Hall Peninsula on Snow Island in the South Shetland Islands, Antarctica. Situated on the northwestern coast of Ivaylo Cove. Due to its steep slopes and sharp summit the feature is a conspicuous landmark in the course of field work in the vicinity. The area was visited by sealers in the early 19th century.

The knoll is named after the city of Sevlievo in northern Bulgaria.

== Maps ==
- South Shetland Islands. Scale 1:200000 topographic map. DOS 610 Sheet W 62 60. Tolworth, UK, 1968
- L.L. Ivanov. Antarctica: Livingston Island and Greenwich, Robert, Snow and Smith Islands. Scale 1:120000 topographic map. Troyan: Manfred Wörner Foundation, 2009. ISBN 978-954-92032-6-4
