= Lovnidol =

- Village
- Location within Bulgaria
- Coordinates: 43°00′N 25°15′E
- Country: Bulgaria
- Province: Gabrovo Province
- Municipality: Sevlievo
- Time zone: UTC+2 (EET)
  - Summer (DST): UTC+3 (EEST)

Lovnidol is a village in the municipality of Sevlievo, in Gabrovo Province, in northern central Bulgaria.

On 12 November 2011 an ammunition depot near the village was blown up. The explosion was later linked to a GRU sabotage group.
