= Agatovo =

- Village
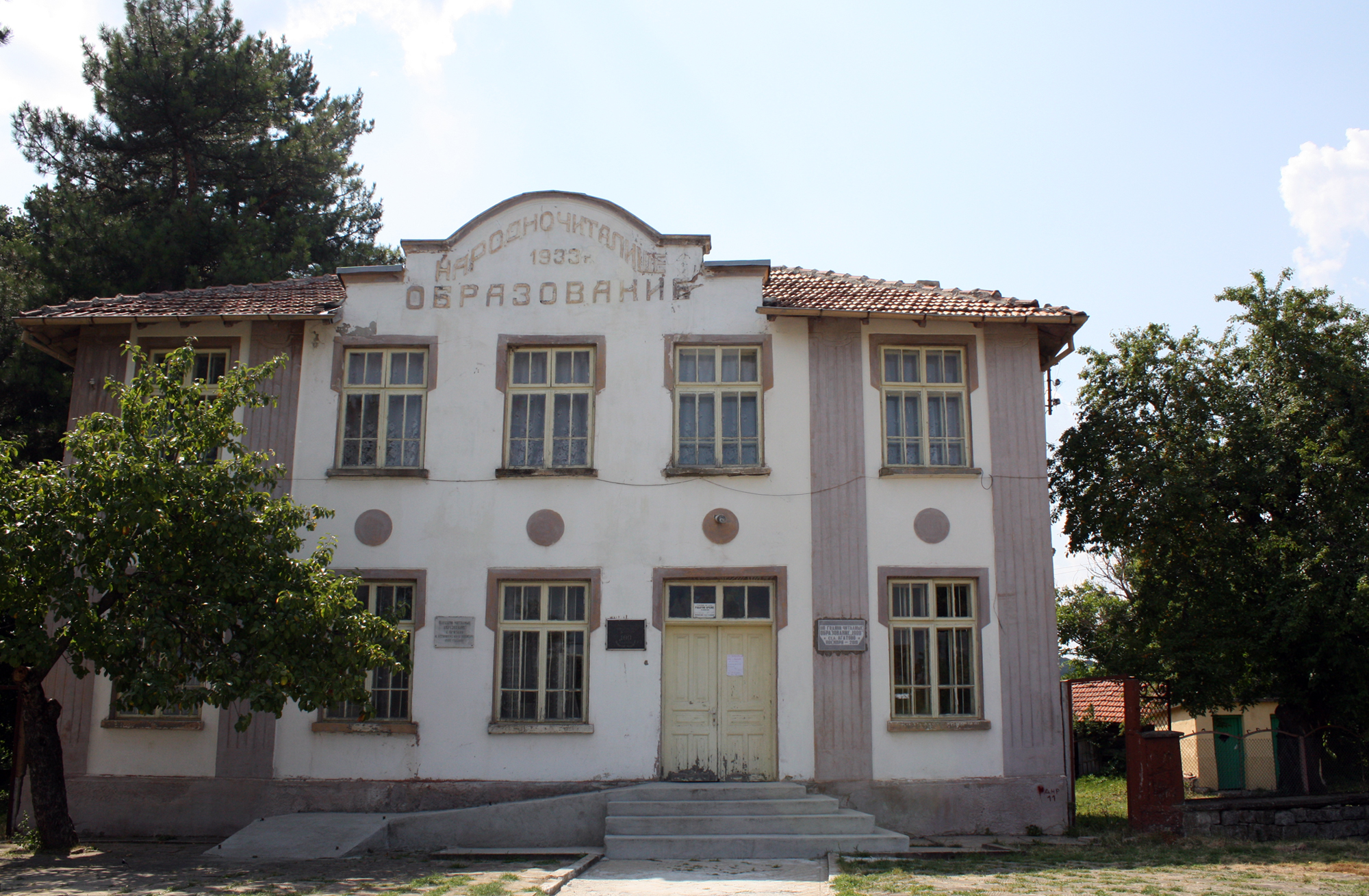
- Culture club in the area

- Location within Bulgaria
- Coordinates: 43°08′N 25°00′E
- Country: Bulgaria
- Province: Gabrovo Province
- Municipality: Sevlievo

Population (2011)
  - Total: 303
- Time zone: UTC+2 (EET)
  - Summer (DST): UTC+3 (EEST)

Agatovo is a village in Sevlievo Municipality, Gabrovo Province, northern central Bulgaria. According to the 2011 Census, 140 residents were Bulgarian, 19 were Turkish, 3 were Romani and 141 didn't provide their ethnicity.
