= Enev rat =

Enev rat Енев рът
- Village
- Location in Bulgaria
- Coordinates: 42°54′43″N 25°02′28″E
- Country: Bulgaria
- Province: Gabrovo Province
- Municipality: Sevlievo

Population (2022)
  - Total: 12
- Time zone: UTC+2 (EET)
  - Summer (DST): UTC+3 (EEST)

Enev rat is a village in the municipality of Sevlievo, in Gabrovo Province, in northern central Bulgaria.
