= Boazat =

- Village
- Location in Bulgaria
- Coordinates: 42°54′30″N 24°57′40″E
- Country: Bulgaria
- Province: Gabrovo Province
- Municipality: Sevlievo
- Time zone: UTC+2 (EET)
  - Summer (DST): UTC+3 (EEST)

Boazat is a village in the municipality of Sevlievo, in Gabrovo Province, in northern central Bulgaria.
