= Karamichevtsi =

- Village
- Location in Bulgaria
- Coordinates: 42.892°N 25.069°E
- Country: Bulgaria
- Province: Gabrovo Province
- Municipality: Sevlievo

Population (15.03.2022)
  - Total: 17
- Time zone: UTC+2 (EET)
  - Summer (DST): UTC+3 (EEST)

Karamichevtsi is a village in the municipality of Sevlievo, in Gabrovo Province, in northern central Bulgaria.
