= Popska, Gabrovo Province =

Popska Попска
- Village
- Location in Bulgaria
- Coordinates: 42.879°N 25.073°E
- Country: Bulgaria
- Province: Gabrovo Province
- Municipality: Sevlievo

Government
  - Mayor: Georgi Aleksandrov

Population (31.12.2024)
  - Total: 22
- Time zone: UTC+2 (EET)
  - Summer (DST): UTC+3 (EEST)

Popska is a village in the municipality of Sevlievo, in Gabrovo Province, in northern central Bulgaria.
