= Selište, Žepče =

Selište
- Village
- Location within Bosnia and Herzegovina
- Coordinates: 44.451349°N 18.028401°E
- Country: Bosnia and Herzegovina
- Entity: Federation of Bosnia and Herzegovina
- Canton: Zenica-Doboj
- Municipality: Žepče

Area
  - Total: 0.37 sq mi (0.96 km^{2})

Population (2013)
  - Total: 93
  - Density: 250/sq mi (97/km^{2})
- Time zone: UTC+1 (CET)
  - Summer (DST): UTC+2 (CEST)

Selište is a village in the municipality of Žepče, Bosnia and Herzegovina.

== Demographics ==
According to the 2013 census, its population was 93, all Croats.
