= Gorna Rositsa =

- Village
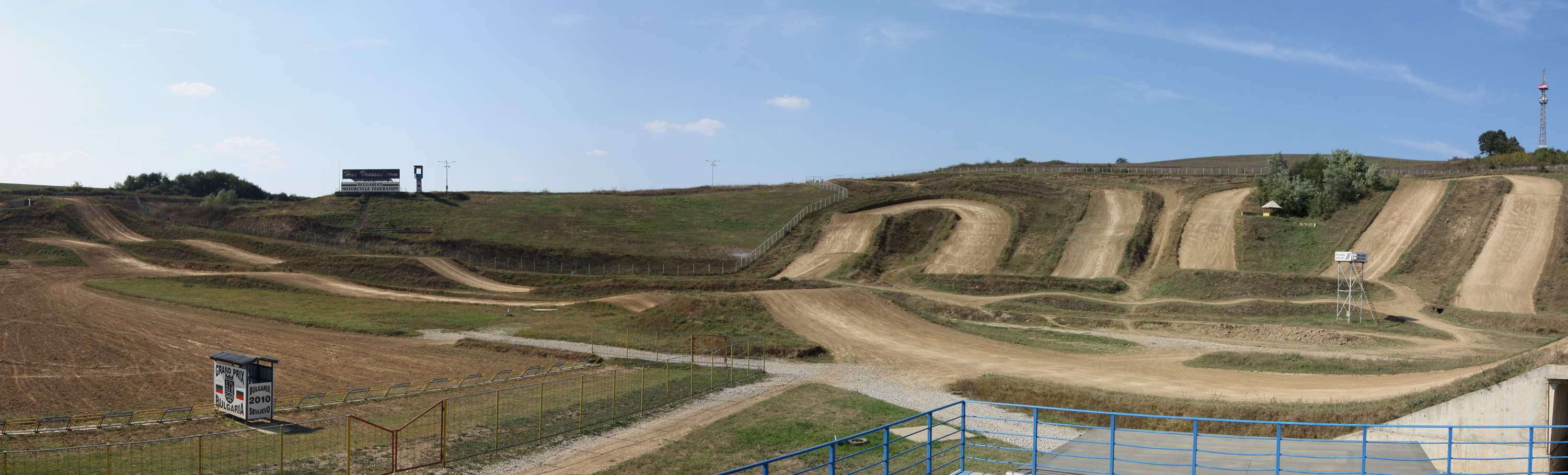
- Sevlievo motorcycle track

- Location within Bulgaria
- Coordinates: 42°57′N 25°08′E
- Country: Bulgaria
- Province: Gabrovo Province
- Municipality: Sevlievo

Government
  - Mayor: Laltsho Zlatev (BSP)

Population (15.03.2022)
  - Total: 675
- Time zone: UTC+2 (EET)
  - Summer (DST): UTC+3 (EEST)

Gorna Rositsa is a village in the municipality of Sevlievo, in Gabrovo Province, in northern central Bulgaria.

== History ==
Prior to the establishment of the Principality of Bulgaria in 1878 the village of Gorna Rositsa was an entirely Turkish settlement known as Dereli. However, these residents soon emigrated and were replaced by Bulgarians from nearby villages.
