= Kravenik =

Kravenik Кравеник
- Village
- Location within Bulgaria
- Coordinates: 42°51′N 25°01′E
- Country: Bulgaria
- Province: Gabrovo Province
- Municipality: Sevlievo

Government
  - Mayor of Municipality: Ivan Ivanov (GERB)

Area
  - Total: 56,948 km^{2} (21,988 sq mi)
- Elevation: 641 m (2,103 ft)

Population (15.03.2022)
  - Total: 219
  - Density: 3.85/km^{2} (10.0/sq mi)
- Time zone: UTC+2 (EET)
  - Summer (DST): UTC+3 (EEST)

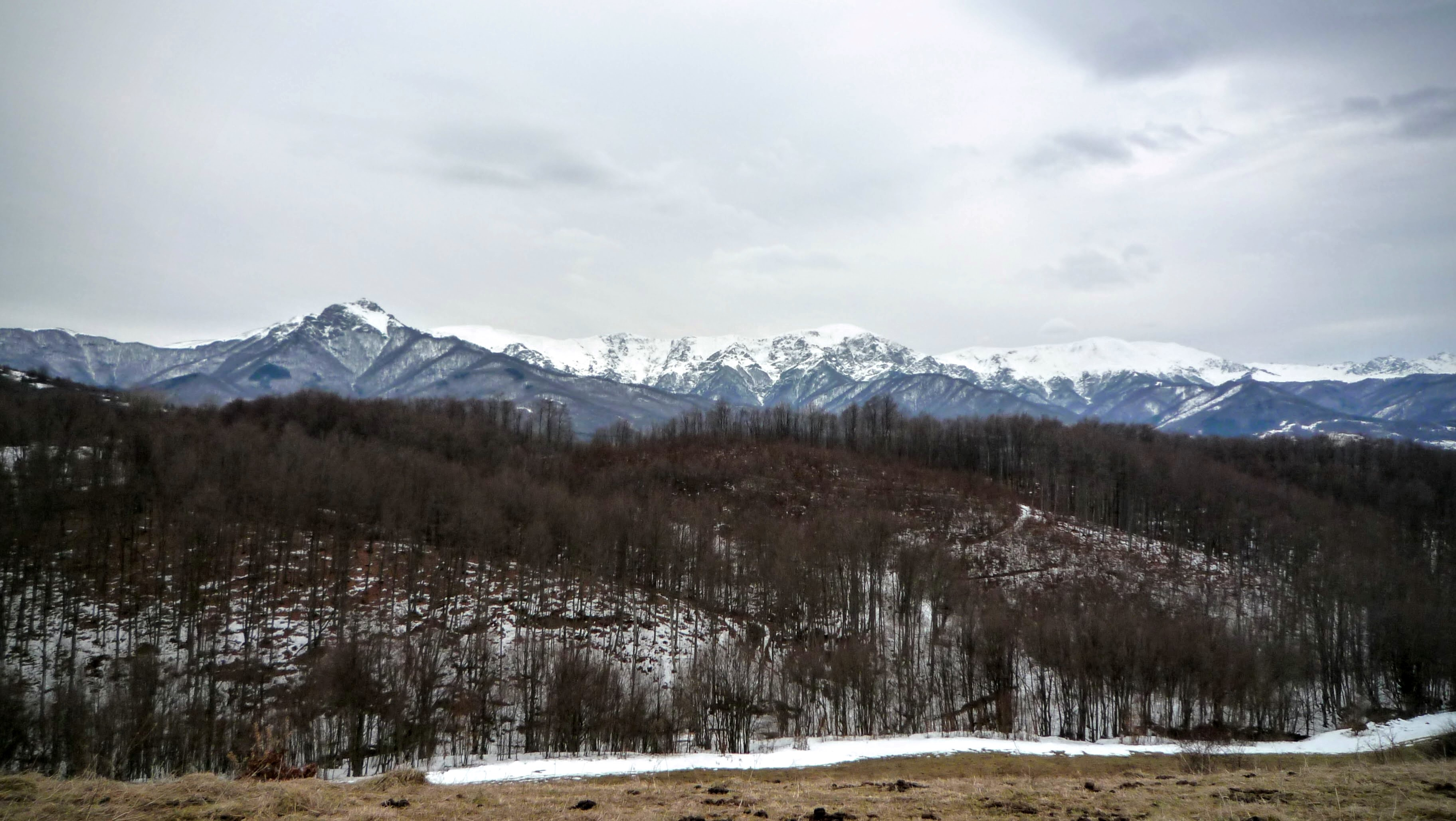

Kravenik is a village in the municipality of Sevlievo, in Gabrovo Province, in northern central Bulgaria.
