= Seliște =

Seliște or Seliștea may refer to the following places:

== Romania ==
- Seliște, a village in Petriș Commune, Arad County
- Seliștea, a village in Cărand Commune, Arad County
- Seliștea, a village in Mileanca Commune, Botoșani County
- Seliștea, a village in Isverna Commune, Mehedinți County

== Moldova ==
- Seliște, Nisporeni, a commune in Nisporeni district
- Seliște, Orhei, a commune in Orhei district
- Seliște, a village in Cazangic Commune, Leova district
- Seliștea Nouă, a village in Tuzara Commune, Călărași district

== See also ==
- Selișteni (disambiguation)
- Selište (disambiguation)
- Selishte (disambiguation)
