= Gradnitsa, Gabrovo Province =

Gradnitsa
- Village
- Flag Seal

- Location in Bulgaria
- Coordinates: 42.958°N 24.958°E
- Country: Bulgaria
- Province: Gabrovo Province
- Municipality: Sevlievo

Population (2011)
  - Total: ▼996
- Time zone: UTC+2 (EET)
  - Summer (DST): UTC+3 (EEST)

Gradnitsa is a village in the municipality of Sevlievo, in Gabrovo Province, in northern central Bulgaria.

The village of Gradnitsa has 996 inhabitants as of 2011, down from 2,000 in the 1980s. It is a mixed village with ethnic Bulgarians (50 percent) and ethnic Turks (50 percent). The largest religions are the Bulgarian Orthodox Church and Islam.
