= Malinovo, Gabrovo Province =

Malinovo
- Village
- Location in Bulgaria
- Coordinates: 42.906°N 24.902°E
- Country: Bulgaria
- Province: Gabrovo Province
- Municipality: Sevlievo

Population (2007)
  - Metro: S
- Time zone: UTC+2 (EET)
  - Summer (DST): UTC+3 (EEST)

Malinovo is a village in the municipality of Sevlievo, in Gabrovo Province, in northern central Bulgaria.
