= Stokite =

Stokite Стоките
- Village
- Location within Bulgaria
- Coordinates: 42°52′N 25°04′E
- Country: Bulgaria
- Province: Gabrovo Province
- Municipality: Sevlievo

Government
  - Mayor: Georgi Aleksandrov

Population (15.03.2022)
  - Total: 206
  - Density: 1.55/km^{2} (4.0/sq mi)
- Time zone: UTC+2 (EET)
  - Summer (DST): UTC+3 (EEST)

Stokite is a village in the municipality of Sevlievo, in Gabrovo Province, in northern central Bulgaria.
