= Prisovo =

Prisovo Присово
- Village
- Location within Bulgaria
- Coordinates: 43°09′25″N 25°18′00″E
- Country: Bulgaria
- Province: Veliko Tarnovo
- Community: Veliko Tarnovo

Area
  - Total: 42,436 km^{2} (16,385 sq mi)
- Elevation: 246 m (807 ft)

Population (2010)
  - Total: 430
  - Density: 0.010/km^{2} (0.026/sq mi)
- Time zone: UTC+2 (EET)
  - Summer (DST): UTC+3 (EEST)
- Post code: 5239
- Area code: 061308

Prisovo is a village in the Veliko Tarnovo province of northern Bulgaria.

== Geography ==
Prisovo is located in the central Danubian Plain, near the Balkan Mountains (Stara Planina). It is 6 kilometres (3.7 mi) from Veliko Tarnovo. The village is located between Prisovo bardo, Debelets bardo and other hills.

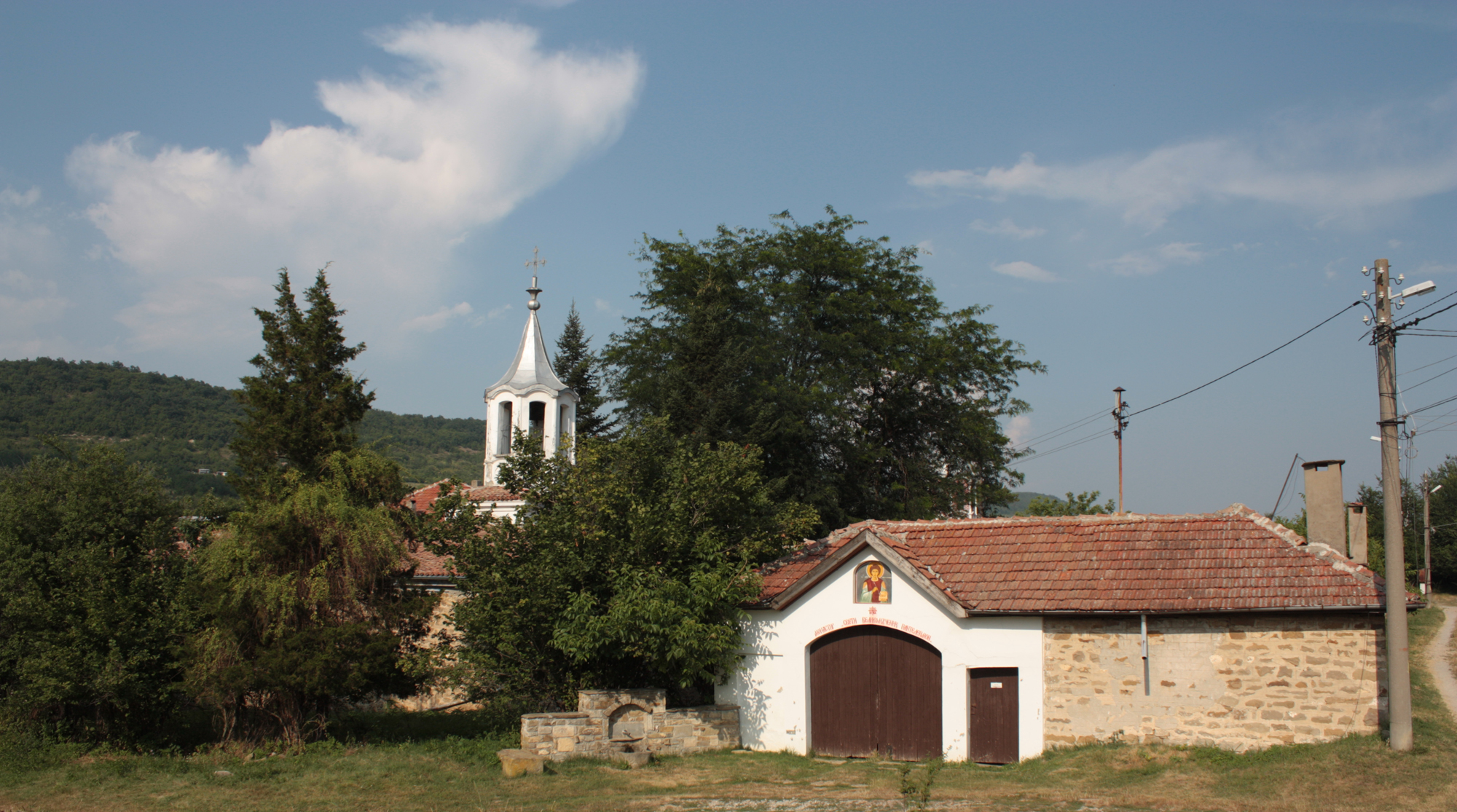
Prisovo Monastery Saint Panteleimonas

== Education ==
- School Hristo Botev

The first school in the village were established in 1897.

== Culture ==
=== Communication center Vasil Levski ===
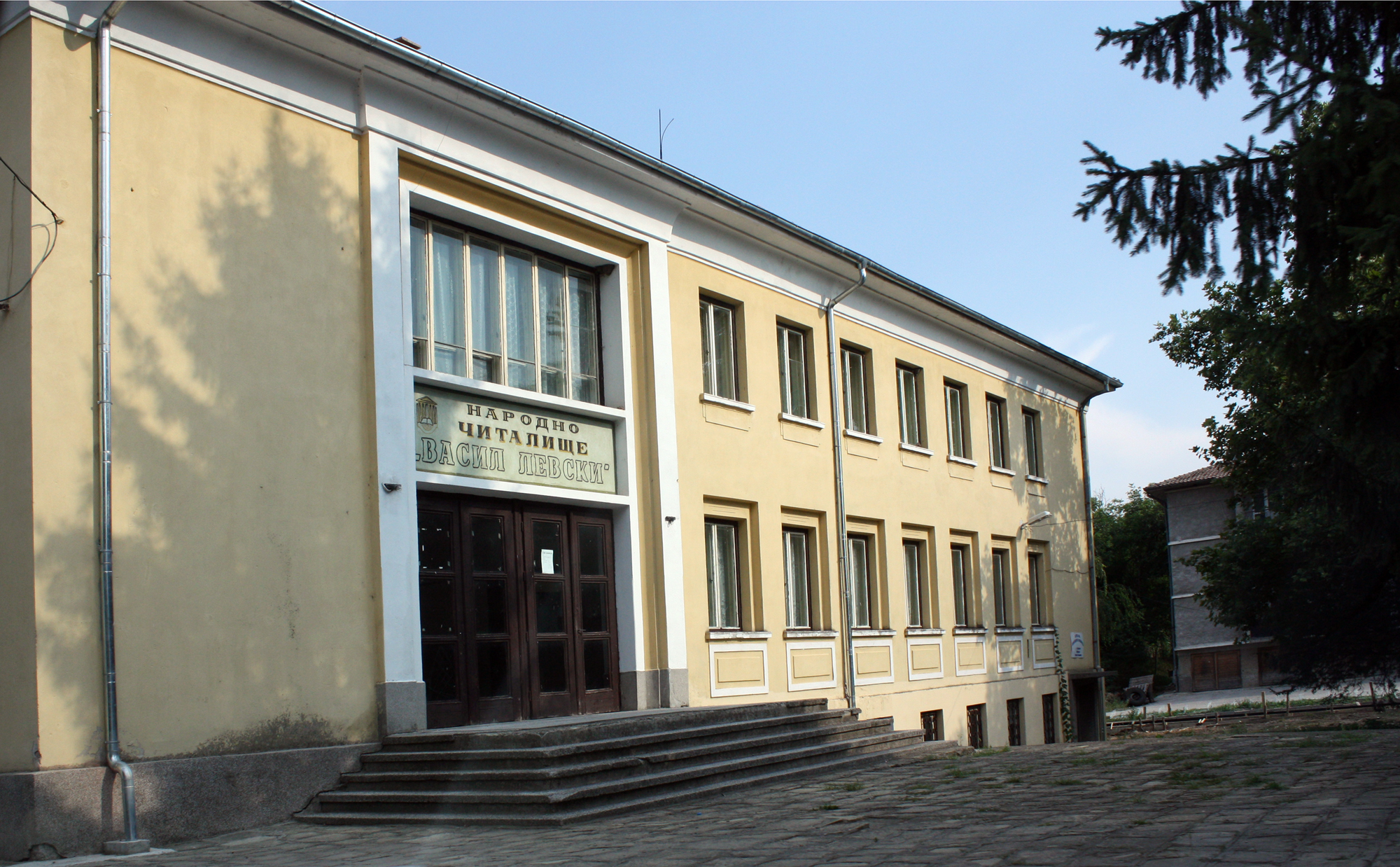

- Prisovo monastery "St. Archangel Michael"
- Standing Monastery "ST. Panteleymon"
