= Batoshevo =

Batoshevo Батошево
- Village
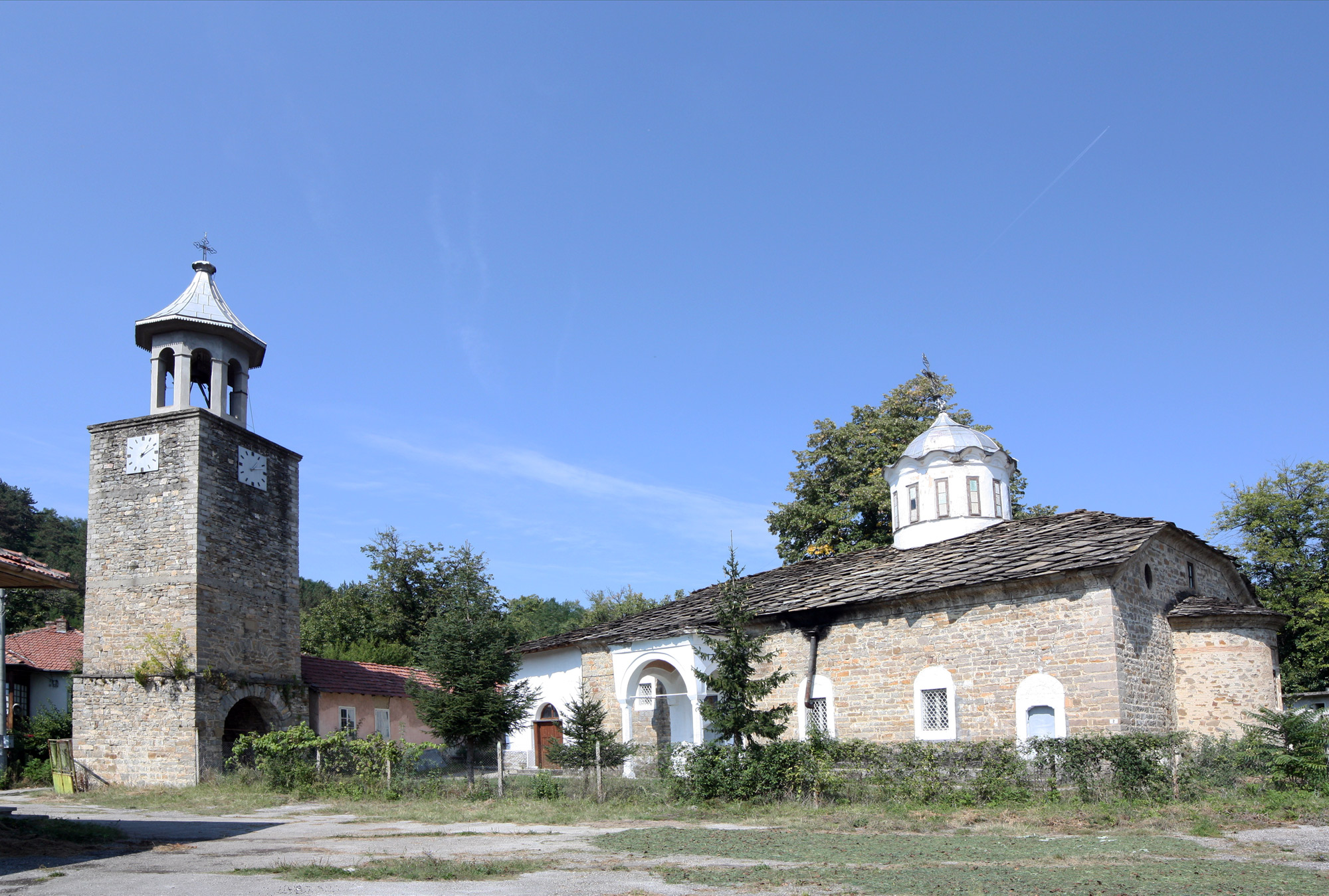
- The Batoshevo church and clock tower

- Location within Bulgaria
- Coordinates: 42°54′N 25°05′E
- Country: Bulgaria
- Province: Gabrovo Province
- Municipality: Sevlievo

Government
  - Mayor: Rositsa Georgieva (GERB)

Population (15.03.2022)
  - Total: 850
  - Density: 38.4/km^{2} (99/sq mi)
- Time zone: UTC+2 (EET)
  - Summer (DST): UTC+3 (EEST)

Batoshevo (Bulgarian: Батошево) is a village in Sevlievo Municipality Gabrovo Province, in northern central Bulgaria.
