= Sevlievo =

Sevlievo Севлиево
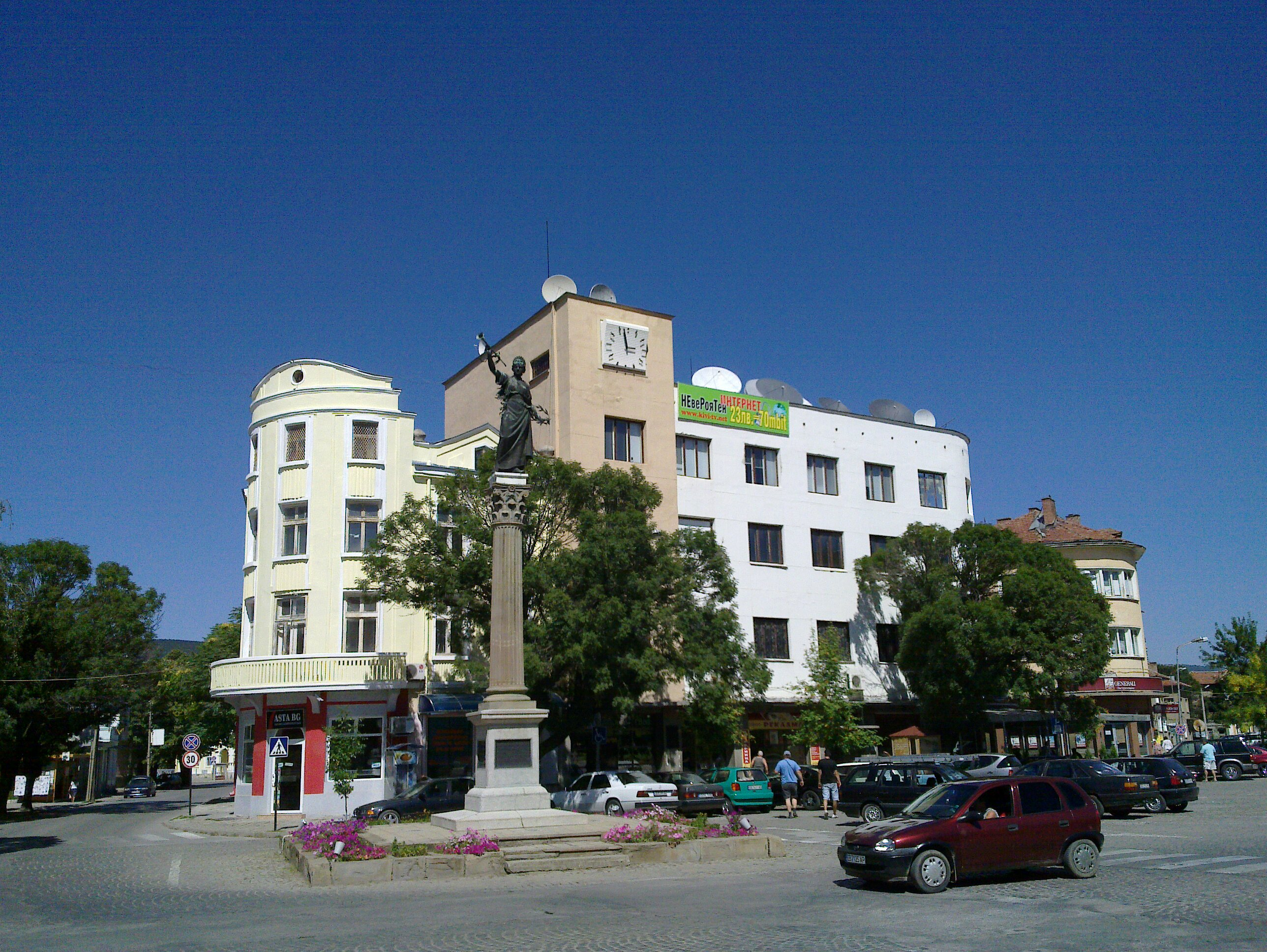
- The central square of Sevlievo with Arnoldo Zocchi's Statue of Liberty.

- Coat of arms

- Location of Sevlievo
- Coordinates: 43°1′32″N 25°6′48″E
- Country: Bulgaria
- Province (Oblast): Gabrovo

Area
  - Total: 47.244 km^{2} (18.241 sq mi)
- Elevation: 230 m (750 ft)

Population (2022)
  - Total: 17,473
  - Density: 369.85/km^{2} (957.90/sq mi)
- Time zone: UTC+2 (EET)
  - Summer (DST): UTC+3 (EEST)
- Postal Code: 5400
- Area code: 0675
- Website: Official website

Sevlievo (Bulgarian: Севлиево [sɛvˈliɛvo]) is a town in north-central Bulgaria, part of Gabrovo Province. Sevlievo is known as one of the wealthiest towns in Bulgaria owing to the well developed local economy, high employment rate and major foreign investments, such as the Ideal Standard Companies factory. It is the administrative centre of the homonymous Sevlievo Municipality.

In 2021, the population of the town was 19,363.

== History ==
The earliest traces of occupation in the region date back to the late Neolithic period (around the 8th century BC). Some Thracian tombs still survive. Hotalich Fortress is the last medieval town. It had been inhabited for more than 1,000 years and functioned as an important defensive center. Hotalich existed for centuries together with the settlement on the site of the contemporary town, known as Servi and Selvi.

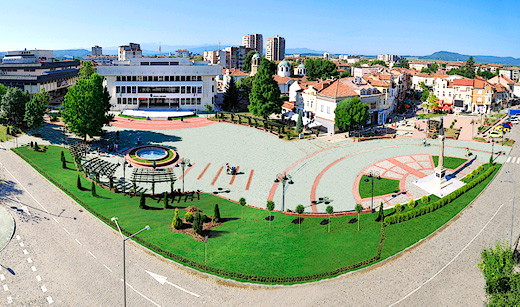
Sevlievo town hall and new city center

In the middle of the 19th century, the development of crafts led to the concentration of large sums of money in the crafts' societies. Commercial trips across the Ottoman Empire, Europe and Russia enriched general knowledge.

In 1834 St Prophet Eliah Church was restored and in 1836 the medieval Batoshevo Monastery was rebuilt. In the mid-1850s, Kolyu Ficheto, a prominent master of the Bulgarian National Revival period, built the stone bridge over the Rositsa River. In 1844 the famous wealthy craftsman and merchant, Hadzhi Stoyan Nikolov, invested his own money in the building of a huge school.

In 1870, under the direct guidance of Vasil Levski, known as the "Apostle of Freedom", a revolutionary committee was created. It prepared the population of Sevlievo for the April Uprising of 1876 against Ottoman rule. The Bulgarians from this region took an active part in the uprising.

Ottoman occupation of the town ended 2 July 1877. As a major cultural institute, the local community center has existed for 127 years. The Mara Belcheva House of Culture became the new center of cultural events.

== Geography ==
=== Climate ===
Sevlievo has a temperate climate with cold winters and hot summers.

Climate data for Sevlievo, Bulgaria
Month	Jan	Feb	Mar	Apr	May	Jun	Jul	Aug	Sep	Oct	Nov	Dec	Year
Record high °C (°F)	20.5 (68.9)	22.6 (72.7)	32.6 (90.7)	32.9 (91.2)	36 (97)	37.8 (100.0)	40.5 (104.9)	41.3 (106.3)	41.7 (107.1)	38 (100)	27.2 (81.0)	21.7 (71.1)	41.7 (107.1)
Mean daily maximum °C (°F)	3.9 (39.0)	6.8 (44.2)	11.5 (52.7)	17.8 (64.0)	22.6 (72.7)	26.4 (79.5)	29.1 (84.4)	29.4 (84.9)	25.4 (77.7)	18.8 (65.8)	11.9 (53.4)	4.8 (40.6)	17.4 (63.3)
Daily mean °C (°F)	−0.5 (31.1)	2.4 (36.3)	5.9 (42.6)	12.4 (54.3)	16.5 (61.7)	20.6 (69.1)	23.2 (73.8)	23.1 (73.6)	18.1 (64.6)	12.4 (54.3)	7.1 (44.8)	2.1 (35.8)	11.6 (52.9)
Mean daily minimum °C (°F)	−4.6 (23.7)	−3.4 (25.9)	0.2 (32.4)	4.5 (40.1)	10.1 (50.2)	13.1 (55.6)	15.6 (60.1)	15.3 (59.5)	11.2 (52.2)	6.2 (43.2)	2.8 (37.0)	−2.7 (27.1)	5.7 (42.3)
Record low °C (°F)	−35.4 (−31.7)	−35 (−31)	−24.3 (−11.7)	−7.5 (18.5)	−1.6 (29.1)	3.2 (37.8)	6.7 (44.1)	5 (41)	−1.8 (28.8)	−7 (19)	−13.5 (7.7)	−26.5 (−15.7)	−35.4 (−31.7)
Average precipitation mm (inches)	40 (1.6)	33 (1.3)	36 (1.4)	60 (2.4)	95 (3.7)	100 (3.9)	79 (3.1)	56 (2.2)	41 (1.6)	44 (1.7)	43 (1.7)	41 (1.6)	668 (26.3)
Source: Stringmeteo.com

== Population ==
Sevlievo
Year	1946	1956	1965	1975	1985	1992	2001	2005	2007	2009	2021
Population	9 827	14 381	20 423	24 429	26 440	25 494	24 775	24 448	24 258	24 065	19 363
Sources: National Statistical Institute, „Citypopulation.de“ „Pop-stat.mashke.org“

== Honour ==
Sevlievo Knoll in the South Shetland Islands, Antarctica is named after the city.

== Twin towns – sister cities ==
Sevlievo is twinned with:

- Babruysk, Belarus
- Gevgelija, North Macedonia
- Legionowo, Poland
- Nanhai, China
- Valašské Meziříčí, Czech Republic

== See also ==
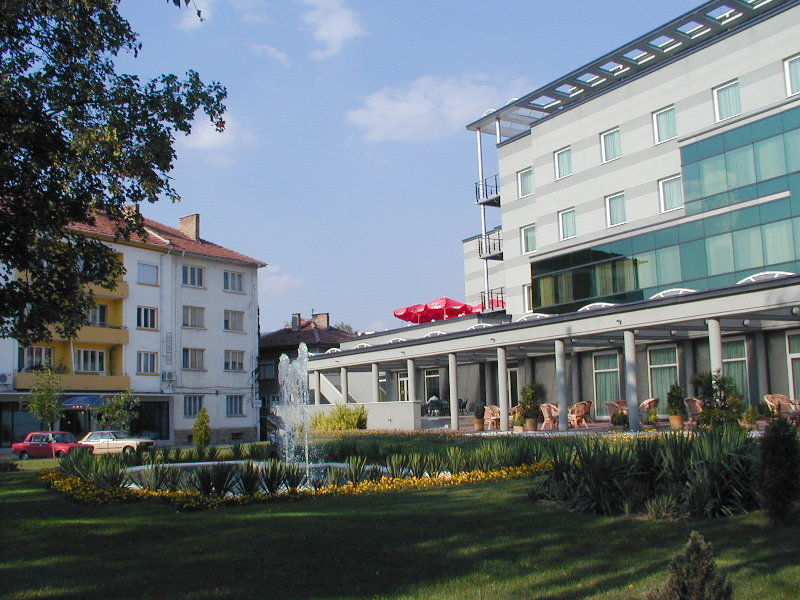
Sevlievo Plaza hotel

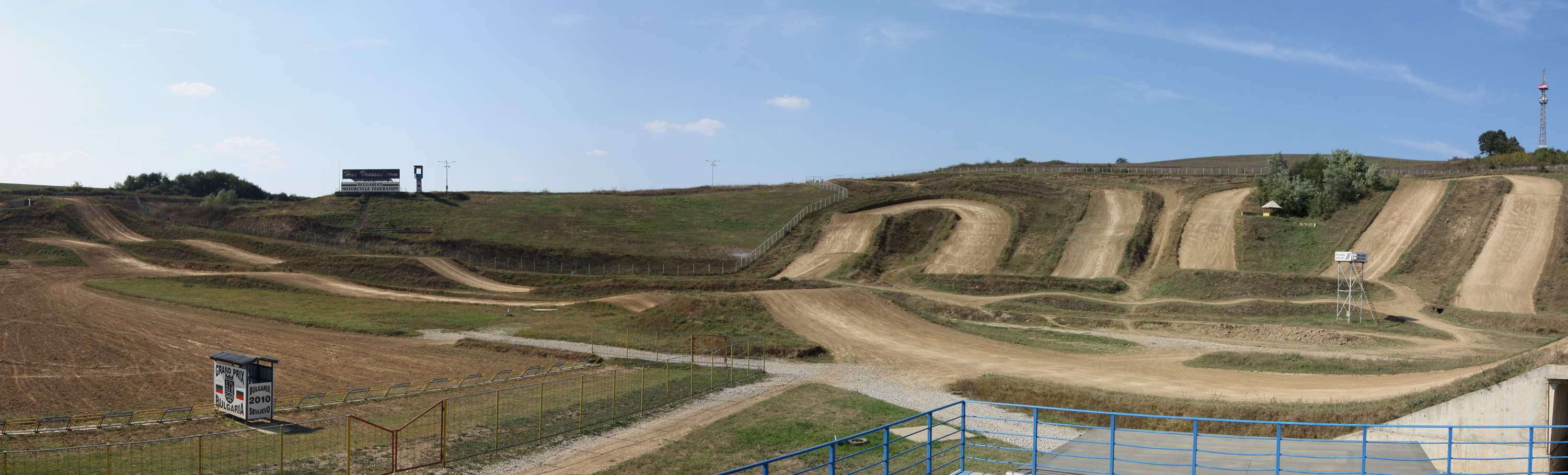
Sevlievo motorcycle track

- Gabrovo humour and jokes
- Ethnographic museum Etara
- Village of Bozhentsi
- City of Tryavna
- City of Dryanovo
- Dryanovo Monastery
- Sokolsky Monastery
- Winter Resort Uzana

== Original source ==
- Guide-bulgaria.com ("All text from Guide-Bulgaria.com is available for reproduction at external web sites if link to Guide-Bulgaria.com is added.") The article has been edited from the source version.
