= Gabrovo Province =

Province in central Bulgaria

Coordinates: 42°55′N 25°15′E

Gabrovo Province Област Габрово
- Province
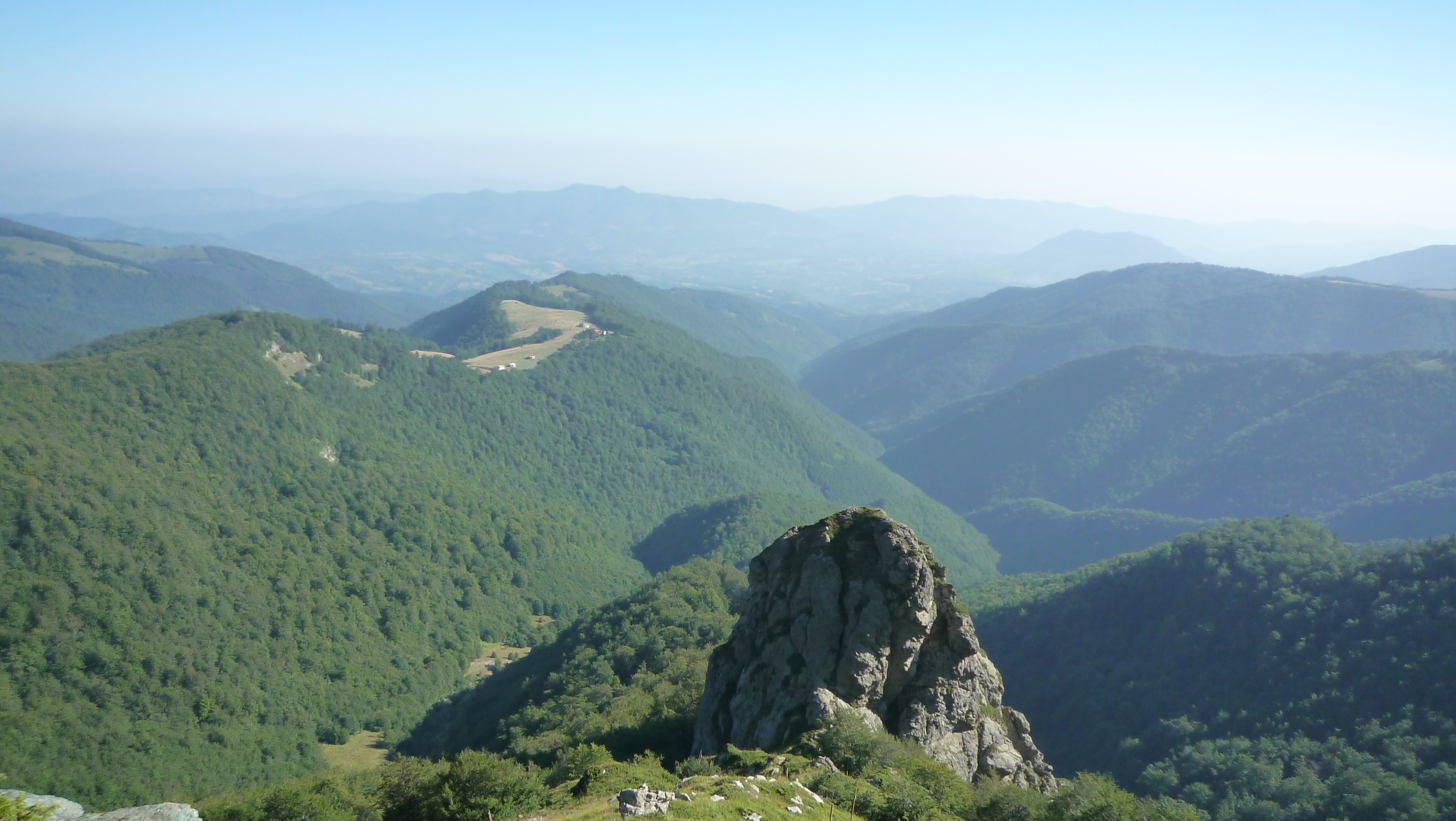
- Central Balkan National Park

- Flag

- Location of Gabrovo Province in Bulgaria
- Country: Bulgaria
- Capital: Gabrovo
- Municipalities: 4

Government
  - Governor: Nevena Petkova

Area
  - Total: 2,023.01 km^{2} (781.09 sq mi)

Population (December 2022)
  - Total: 95,957
  - Density: 47.433/km^{2} (122.85/sq mi)
- Time zone: UTC+2 (EET)
  - Summer (DST): UTC+3 (EEST)
- License plate: EB
- Website: www.gb.government.bg

Gabrovo Province (Bulgarian: Област Габрово, romanized: Oblast Gabrovo; former name Gabrovo okrug) is a small province lying at the geographical centre of Bulgaria. It is named after its main town – Gabrovo. In 2009 the total population of the area was 130,001.

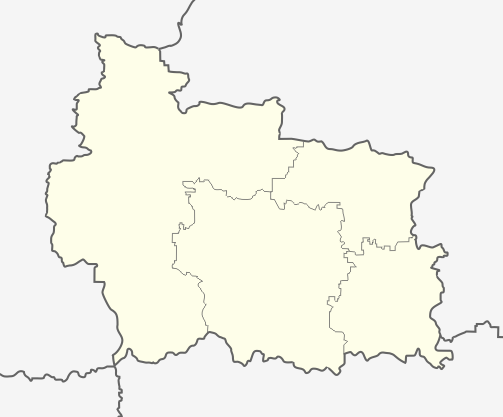

== Municipalities ==
The Gabrovo province (област, oblast) contains four municipalities (singular: община, obshtina – plural: общини, obshtini). The following table shows the names of each municipality in English and Cyrillic, the main town (in bold) or village, and the population of each as of 2009.

Municipality	Cyrillic	Pop.	Town/Village	Pop.
Dryanovo	Дряново	10,502	**Dryanovo**	8,043
Gabrovo	Габрово	67,501	**Gabrovo**	60,281
Sevlievo	Севлиево	39,537	**Sevlievo**	24,065
Tryavna	Трявна	12,461	**Tryavna**	9,831

== Demographics ==
Historical population
Year	Pop.	±%
1946	151,209	—
1956	154,864	+2.4%
1965	168,629	+8.9%
1975	175,933	+4.3%
1985	174,681	−0.7%
1992	161,987	−7.3%
2001	144,125	−11.0%
2011	122,702	−14.9%
2021	98,387	−19.8%
Source: pop-stat.mashke.org

The Gabrovo province had a population of 144,150 (144,125 also given) according to a 2001 census, of which 48.4% were male and 51.6% were female.

As of the end of 2009, the population of the province, announced by the Bulgarian National Statistical Institute, numbered 130,001 of which 30.4% are inhabitants aged over 60 years.

Ethnic groups (2021 census):

- Bulgarians: 89,394 (90.86%)
- Turks: 4,723 (4.80%)
- Romani: 735 (0.75%)
- Others and indefinable: 3,535 (3.59%)

=== Religion ===
Religious adherence in the province according to 2001 census:

Census 2001
religious adherence	population	%
Orthodox Christians	131 325	91.12%
Muslims	8 860	6.15%
Roman Catholics	432	0.30%
Protestants	270	0.19%
Other	534	0.36%
Religion not mentioned	2 704	1.88%
**total**	**144 125**	100%

== Main city ==
Gabrovo is the main city of the Province of Gabrovo. Known for producing leather articles and textiles, these earned the town the sobriquet of the “Manchester of Bulgaria”.

To the Bulgarians, Gabrovo is mainly known as the home of Humour and Satire, which opened on Aprils Fool’s Day 1972 in recognition of the position traditionally occupied by the town in the Bulgarian humour. People in every country tell jokes about the supposed miserliness of a particular community, and in Bulgaria the butt of the jokes has always been Gabrovo.

A Festival of Humour and Satire takes place in May, comprising masked actors, folk music, animated cartoons and the giving of prizes. There are plenty of restaurants in the city itself but the local people will recommend that you go out of town and visit Bozhentsi and the Etara complex.

== Bozhentsi and Etara ==
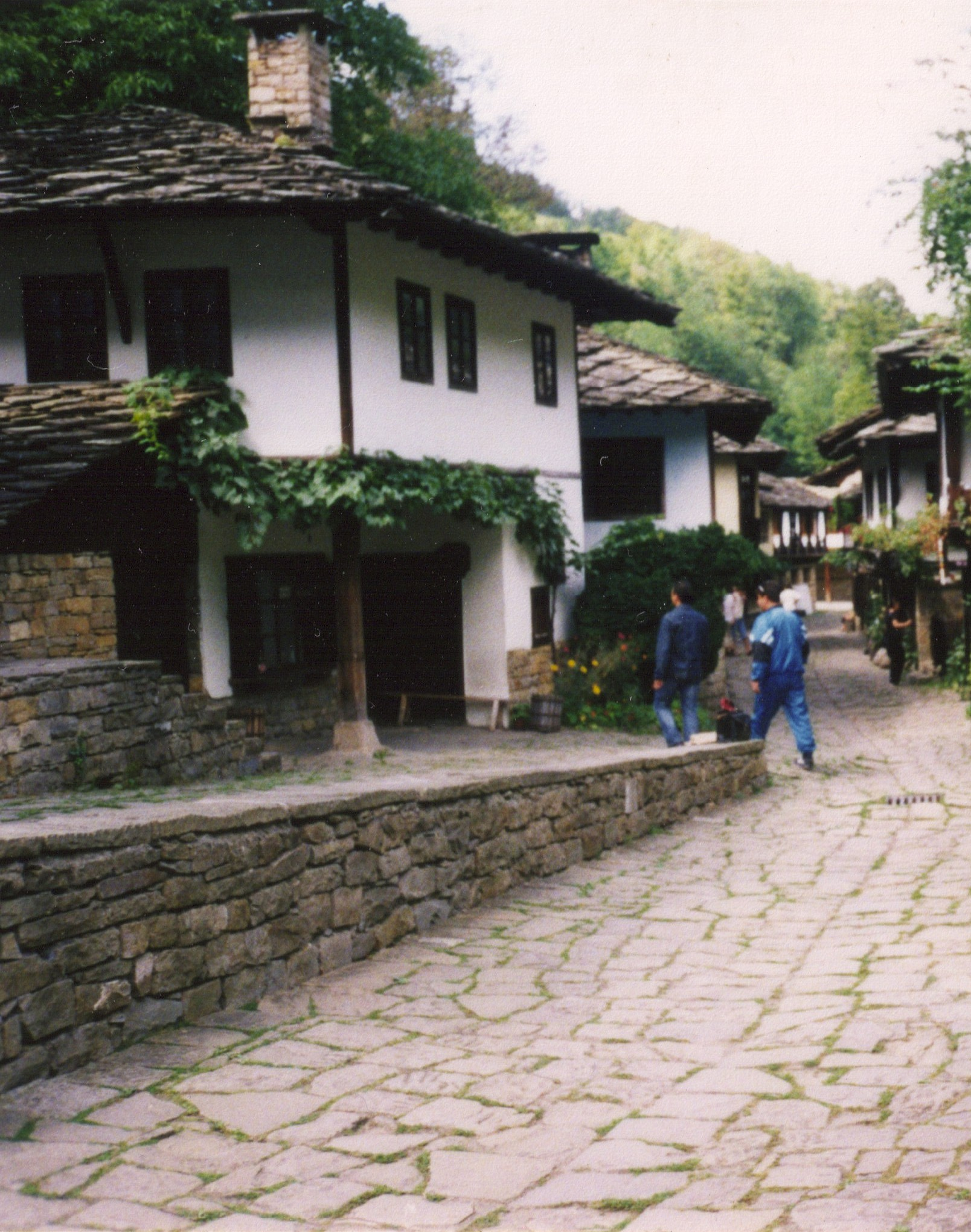
View of the Etara complex

Bozhentsi is preserved as an old village museum. There is an ethnographic open-air museum, Etara, nearby. Strung out along the valley, with its clear bubbling stream and rich bird-life, the Etara complex has the look and feel of a film set, and even though it is artificial.

Traditionally crafts were inseparable from the charshya (bazaar), and the reconstructed bazaar of the type once common in Bulgarian towns forms the heart of the open-air museum. Throughout much of the day artisans are at work here, hammering blades, throwing pots, carving bowls and the like, and everything they make is for sale. Note that many of the artisans leave an hour or so before the complex officially closes.

Besides dwellings and workshops, the bazaar includes a couple of places for grabbing a quick drink, including a traditional café, and a bakery selling Turkish delight and many other sweet treats.

An hour or so walk southwest from Etara, Sokolsky Monastery perches on a crag above the village of Voditsi. During Ottoman times the monks offered succour to Bulgarian outlaws and an assembly point during the uprising against the Turks in 1876. Nowadays it is a discreet, little-visited place, with rosebushes and privet shrubs laid out in a courtyard dominated by an octagonal stone fountain.

== Tourism ==
Places of interest in Gabrovo province include architectural reserve Bozhentsi. Hiking is widely available in the Central Balkan National Park and in the Bulgarka Nature Park, itself home to Etar Architectural-Ethnographic Complex, Dryanovo Monastery, Sokolski Monastery, Shipka Pass, and the Uzana area. For admirers of historical tourism the Shipka Freedom Memorial is a must-see.

== See also ==
- Provinces of Bulgaria
- Municipalities of Bulgaria
- List of cities and towns in Bulgaria
- List of villages in Gabrovo Province
