= Uzana (Bulgaria) =

Winter resort in Bulgaria

Coordinates: 42°45′30″N 25°14′14″E

Uzana Winter Resort
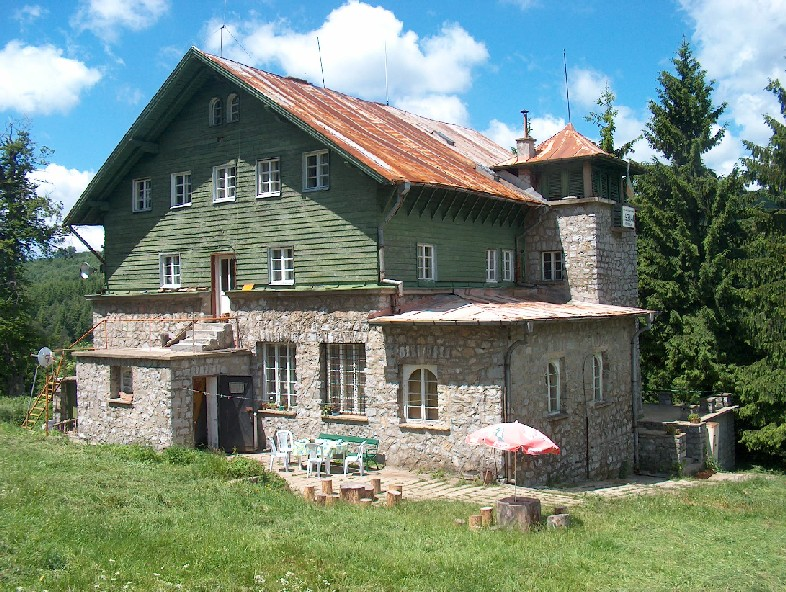
- Uzana mountain chalet is a budget accommodation at the resort
- Interactive map of Uzana Winter Resort
- Location: Balkan Mountains
- Nearest city: Gabrovo
- Top elevation: 4,429 ft (1,350 m)
- Base elevation: 4,000 ft (1,200 m)
- Skiable area: 800 acres (3.2 km^{2})
- Longest run: 4,265 ft (1,300 m)
- Snowfall: 200 inches / 508 cm
- Website: Homepage

Uzana (Bulgarian: Узана) is a winter resort in Bulgaria. It is located at the foot of Ispolin peak at 1,420 m above sea level, near the Bulgarka Nature Park in the Balkan Mountains. It consists of large meadows surrounded by forest. The altitude varies from 1,220 to 1,350 m. The longest ski run is 3,609 ft /1,100 m. The nearest big city is Gabrovo, some 22 km away. The resort with its 15 hotels provides tourism opportunities throughout the year.

The surrounding sites of Uzana are suitable for speleology, skiing, and rock climbing. There are possibilities for cultural tourism in the region. In the nearby open-air ethnographic museum Etara people can learn more about Bulgarian crafts. The Sokolski Monastery is situated a few kilometers away from Uzana.

Tourism in the Uzana region started in 1937 when the first chalet also named Uzana was built on the southern side of the meadow.

Uzana is a home of rare floral species included in the Red Book of Endangered Species.

It is the starting position of many mountain routes as well as the summits Shipka and Buzludja.

== Geographic center ==
Uzana is also the geographic center of Bulgaria. The point of the Geographic centre itself was inaugurated in December 1991 by the president of Republic Bulgaria at the time – Zhelyu Zhelev. Since 2008 the centre has been included into the National Tourist Movement "100 Tourist Sites of Bulgaria" at number 19, along with the Etar Architectural-Ethnographic Complex, the National Museum of Education and the House of Humor and Satire in the city of Gabrovo.

== See also ==
- Bulgarka Nature Park
- Etar Architectural-Ethnographic Complex
- Gabrovo
- Shipka Memorial
- Shipka Pass
- Central Balkan National Park
