= Sirmani =

Neighborhood of Gabrovo, Bulgaria

Coordinates: 42°52′6″N 25°18′20″E

Sirmani (Bulgarian: Сирмани) is a neighborhood of Gabrovo in Bulgaria, located on one of Gabrovo’s hills. The neighborhood consists of an old area and a contemporary area. The greatest part of it consists of woodlands and meadows.

Sirmani (Bulgaria)

== History ==
Sirmani became a neighborhood in the early years of Ottoman rule, and hosted traditional Bulgarian cottages. The cottages were preserved as the area developed.

== Origin ==
The name “Sirmani” derives from the people that lived in the old cottages probably in the 15th century. Sirman means a species of fish in the family of Neogobius syrman. The area was known for the plentiful syrmans caught in the nearby lake.

== Landmarks ==
Two landmarks of Gabrovo are located in Sirmani: the Gabrovo Regional Hospital and the Technical University of Gabrovo.
