= Gabrovo humour =

Bulgarian regional humour

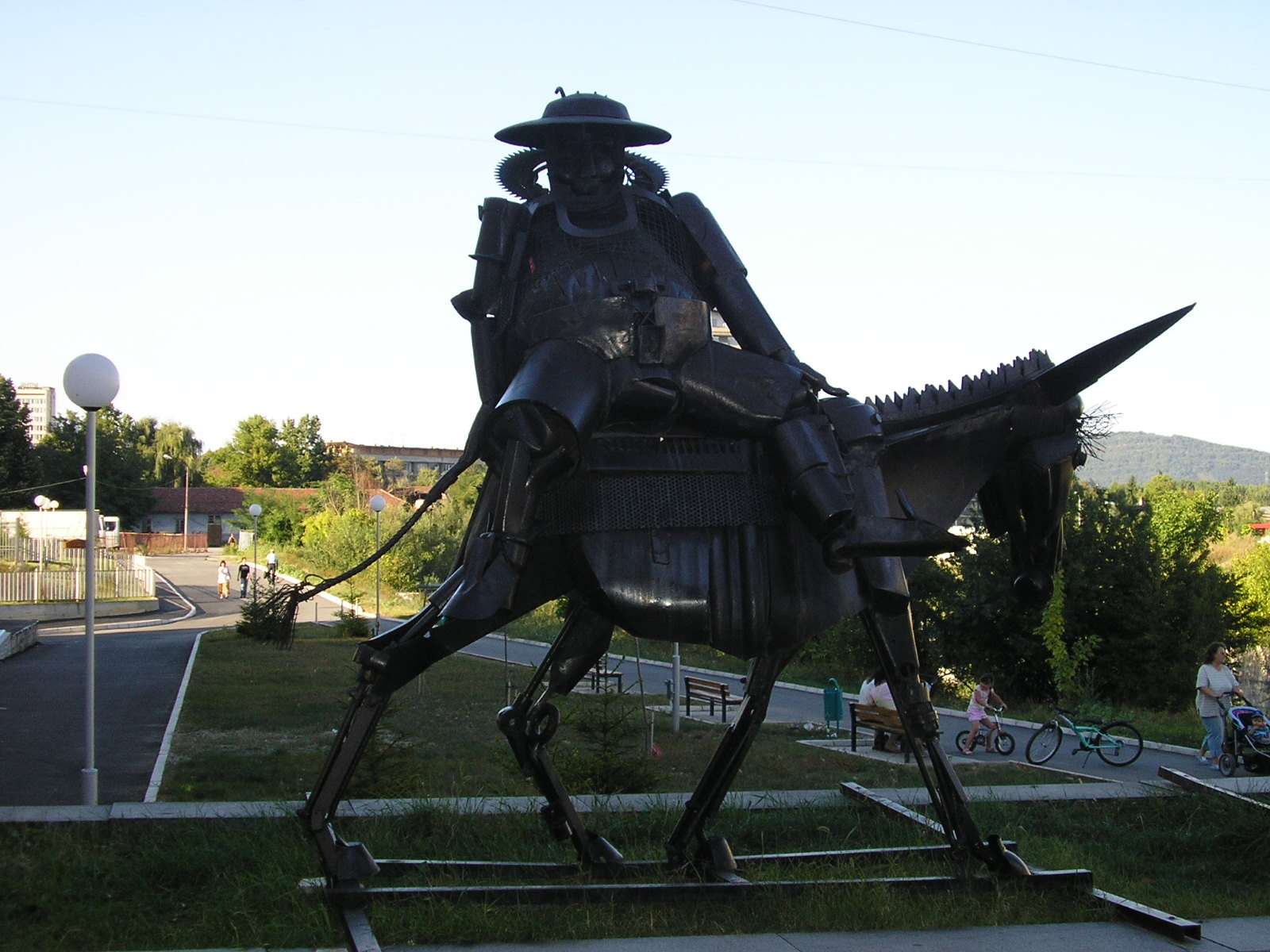

The city of Gabrovo, Bulgaria is well known for the unique sense of humour possessed by its citizens. Local humour centres on the alleged stinginess of its citizens and a rivalry with the neighbouring village of Sevlievo. Gabrovo prides itself on being a centre for humour; the House of Humour and Satire in Gabrovo exists to promote humour both locally and internationally.

Citizens of Gabrovo reputedly excel in business and in bargaining, and developed their sense of humour as an aid to attract customers and improve business relations. As Gabrovo grew in industrial and economic importance, the city's brand of humour and reputation for shrewdness and economy spread nationally in Bulgaria.

== Select sayings ==
It is said that the people of Gabrovo (known as Gabrovtsi):

- cut the tails off their cats so they can close the door faster when they let the cat out, in order to save heat. (A black cat with a cut-off tail is one of Gabrovo's symbols.)
- fit taps to eggs (as one might do with a keg) so as to tap only as much as needed for a soup and save the rest.
- turn their clocks off before they go to sleep to prevent wear and tear.
- put green spectacles on their donkeys so that the donkeys will mistake shavings for hay and eat it.
- sweat both in the smithy and when bargaining in the market place.
- heat their knives so that guests invited for tea cannot help themselves to butter.
- drop cats down chimneys instead of spending money on chimney sweeps.
- are so aggressive in business that when something new has only just hit the headlines somewhere, it has already been done in Gabrovo.
- bury their dead relatives perpendicular to save some land which it would take if they laid the dead body to bury

== Select jokes ==
The following are a selection of well-known jokes from Gabrovo.

- A citizen of Gabrovo throws a party, but too many people show up. So he goes to his neighbour for help.

"Hi, I've got a big problem! 15 guests showed up but I've only got 10 chairs! Do you have any extras?"
"Yes, my kids are away at college, so I've got a couple I'm not using"
"That's perfect; I'll send five to your house."

- Why don't people from Gabrovo buy refrigerators? Because they can't be sure the light goes off when the door's closed.
- Why do people dance in socks during weddings in Gabrovo? Because they listen to the music from the neighbouring town (in reference to Sevlievo).
- Why do people from Gabrovo switch the lamp on and off every now and then when they're reading a book? To save energy while turning pages.
- Gabrovo and Scotland residents tend to get along very well. For example, once, a Gabrovets and a Scottish man were sitting together at a lecture. Once it ended, the organizers started collecting charity. With no words exchanged, the Gabrovets fainted at once, and the Scottish man carried him out.

== See also ==
- House of Humour and Satire in Gabrovo
- City of Gabrovo
