= Bulgarka Nature Park =

Nature park in Bulgaria

- IUCN category IV (habitat/species management area)
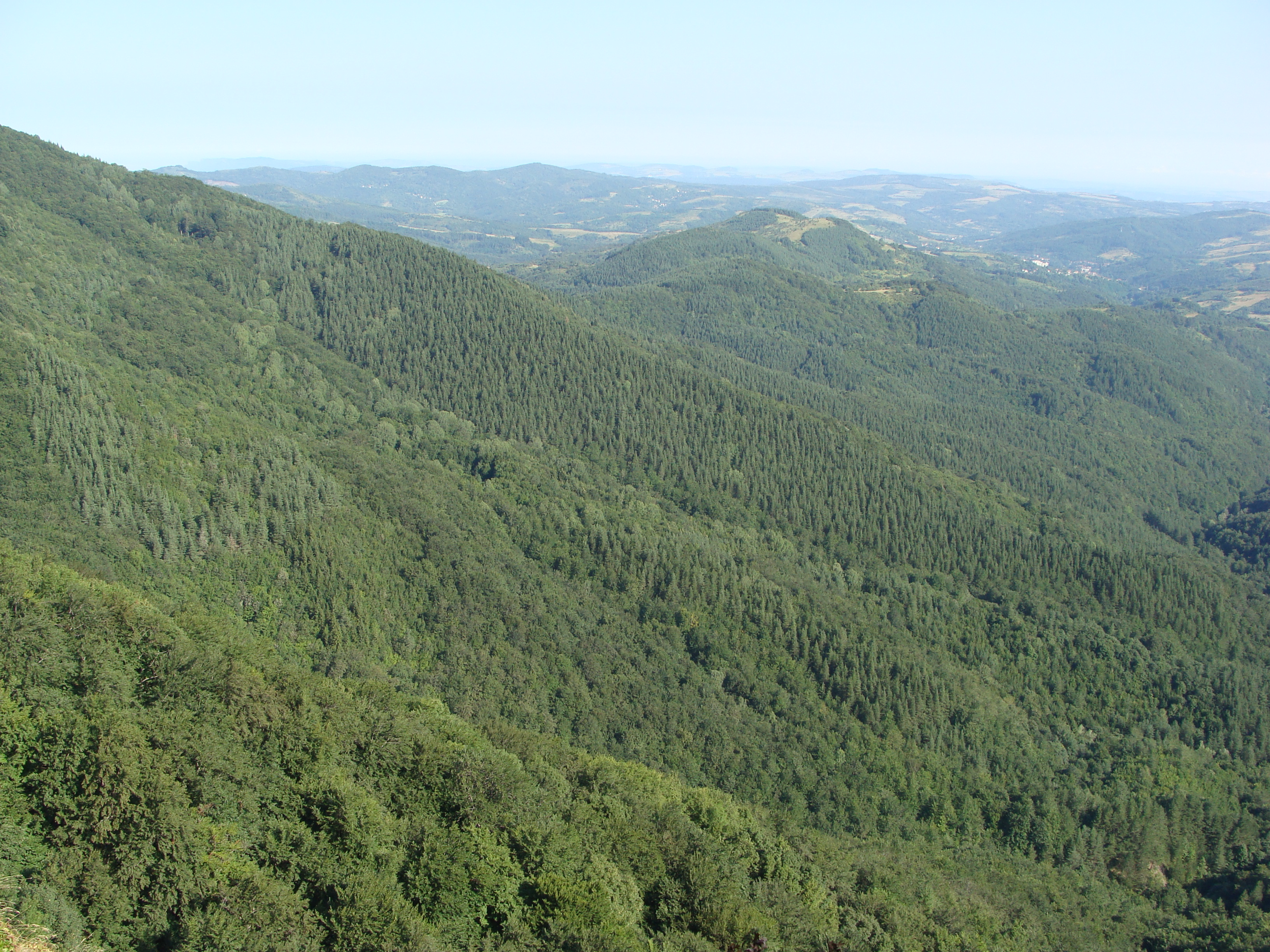
- Bulgarka Nature Park
- Interactive map of Bulgarka Nature Park
- Location: Gabrovo Province, Stara Zagora Province, Bulgaria
- Nearest city: Gabrovo
- Coordinates: 42.82°N 25.34°E
- Area: 22,000 ha (54,000 acres)
- Established: August 9, 2002
- Governing body: Bulgarka Natural Park

The Bulgarka Natural Park (Bulgarian: Природен парк ″Българка″) is a Bulgarian nature park on the northern slopes of the Balkan Mountains (Stara Planina), occupying 22,000 hectares of territory in the central and eastern part of the mountains between the cities of Gabrovo and Kazanluk.

Located between the steep topography of the Central Balkan and the significantly lower and sloping eastern part of Stara Planina, the region is characterized by significant diversity in terrain. This supports a rich diversity in flora and fauna. Further, due to the area's position in a section of the Balkans that served as a crossroads for the region for centuries, the park is home to many historic sites.

The area's historical and biological significance lead to the establishment of the Bulgarka Natural Park on August 9, 2002.

== Fauna ==
In terms of zoology, the park is in the Balkan region of European fauna.

Many wild animals, such as the Eurasian wolf, fox, the golden jackal, Eurasian brown bear, wild boar, red deer, roe deer, hare, eastern hedgehog, squirrel, badger, mink and others inhabit the forested lands of the Bulgarka Park. Birds include the golden eagle, the common kestrel, rock dove, great spotted woodpecker, black woodpecker, green woodpecker, cuckoo, common buzzard, owl, white wagtail, turtledove, jay, magpie, raven, hooded crow, blackbird, starling, nightingale, oriole, great tit and others.

Reptiles native to the park lands include three species of snakes as well as lizards and others. Amphibians include several frogs, salamander; invertebrates include snails, tritons and many kinds of insects. Fish include trout, black fish, and others.

== Flora ==
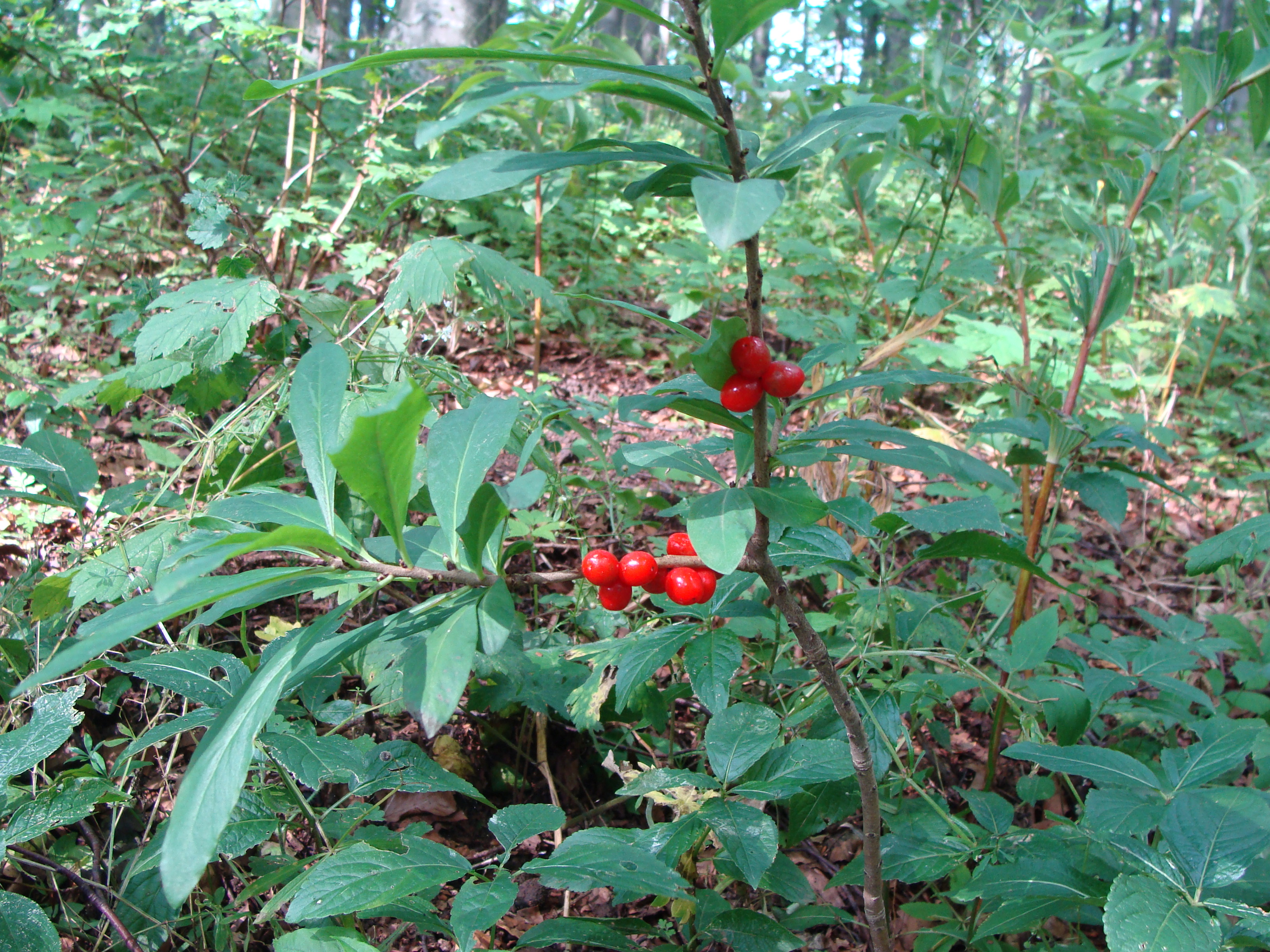
Forest fruits (Daphne mezereum) in Bulgarka Nature Park

Forests cover about 80.2% of the park area, or 17,461 hectares. Varieties of beech constitute the largest portion of the forest, at 65%. Other deciduous trees include oaks, water locust, birch hornbeam, linden, elm, acacia, aspen, maple, ash, wild cherry, holly, rowan, birch and others. Coniferous trees found in the park include white and black pine, spruce, fir, white fir and others. Gymnosperm plants covers about 0.6 ha.

This botanical uniqueness — which occurs only in this part of Bulgaria and has includes special combinations of beech, yew, and laurel — makes the park a significant conservation habitat. In Bulgarka Park, designated areas are established to promote greater habitat conservation.

Nearly 70% of the officially recognized medicinal plants in Bulgaria may be found in Bulgarka Park.

At least 360 plant species including 31 species listed as threatened or endangered, may be found in the park. This includes yew, wild ticket silivryak gesneriaceae, mountain maple, Bulgarian types of orchids, medicinal tweeter, mountain onion cytisus, mountain vetch astragalus, among other. However, as one of the youngest nature parks in Bulgaria, a full classification of all the types of flora and fauna is yet to come.

== Cultural heritage ==
Sites of cultural heritage inside Bulgarka Park include the Shipka Pass, the location of the Battle of Shipka Pass which was pivotal in gaining Bulgarian independence from the Ottoman Empire. The Shipka Memorial commemorates the battle.

Also in the park are the Etar Architectural-Ethnographic Complex, the Sokolski Monastery and Dryanovo Monastery.

The park is home to the Uzana area, a large mountain meadow high in the Balkans which is a popular winter resort. Uzana has been home to winter sports since the 1930s and has 15 hotels, which provide recreational opportunities year-round.

== Gallery ==
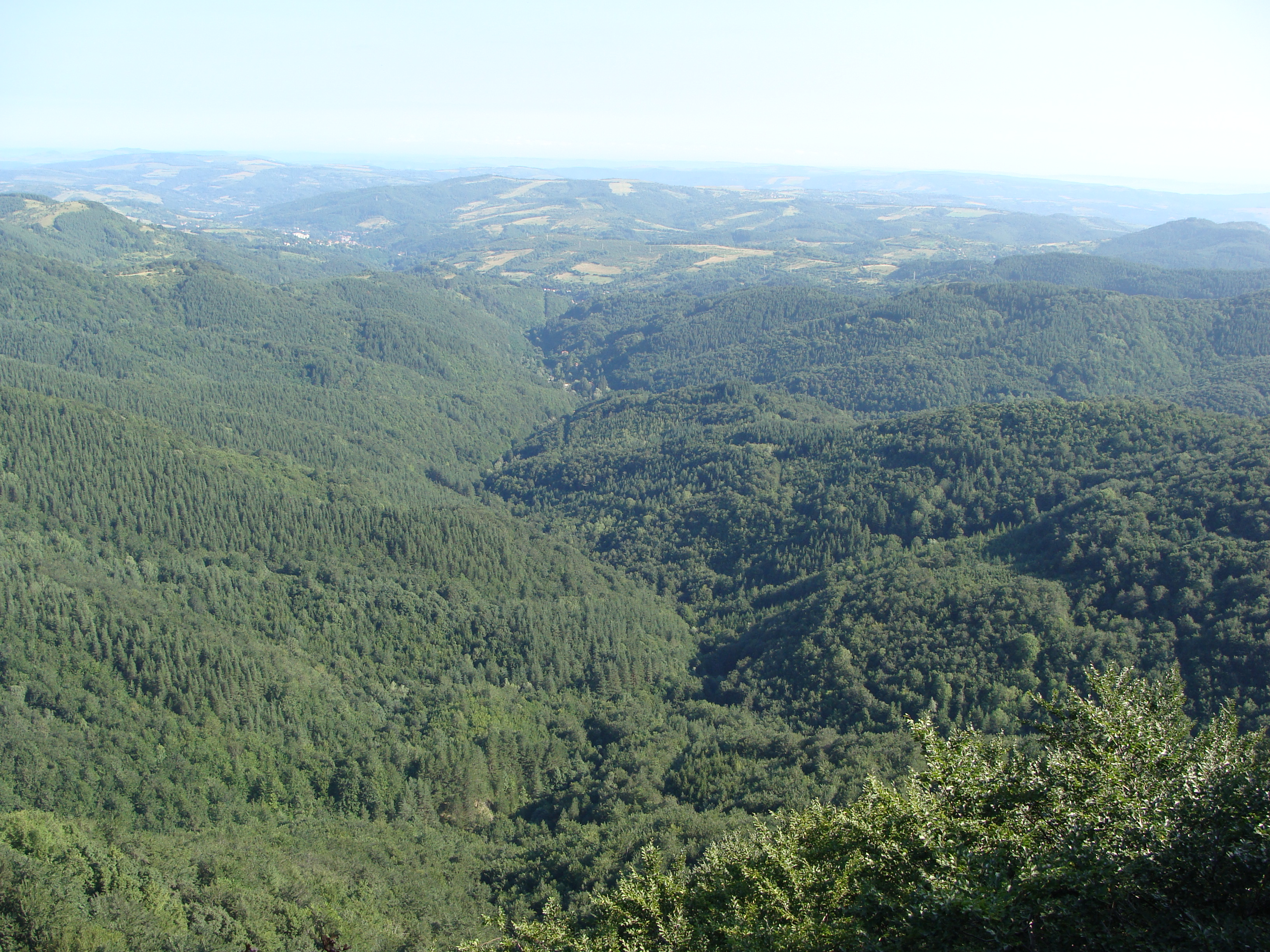
Bulgarka Nature Park - view from peak Bulgarka

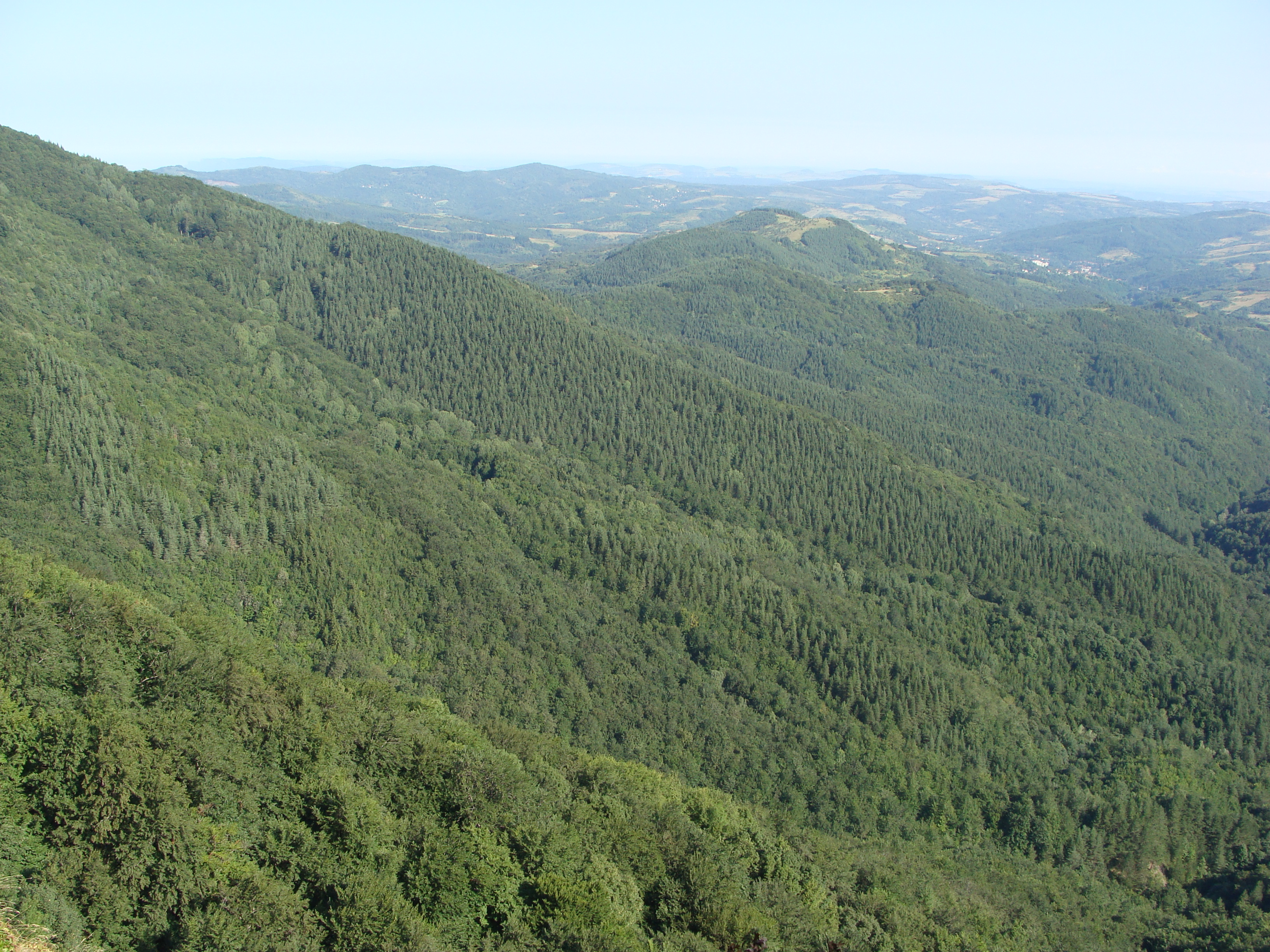
Forest in Bulgarka Nature Park

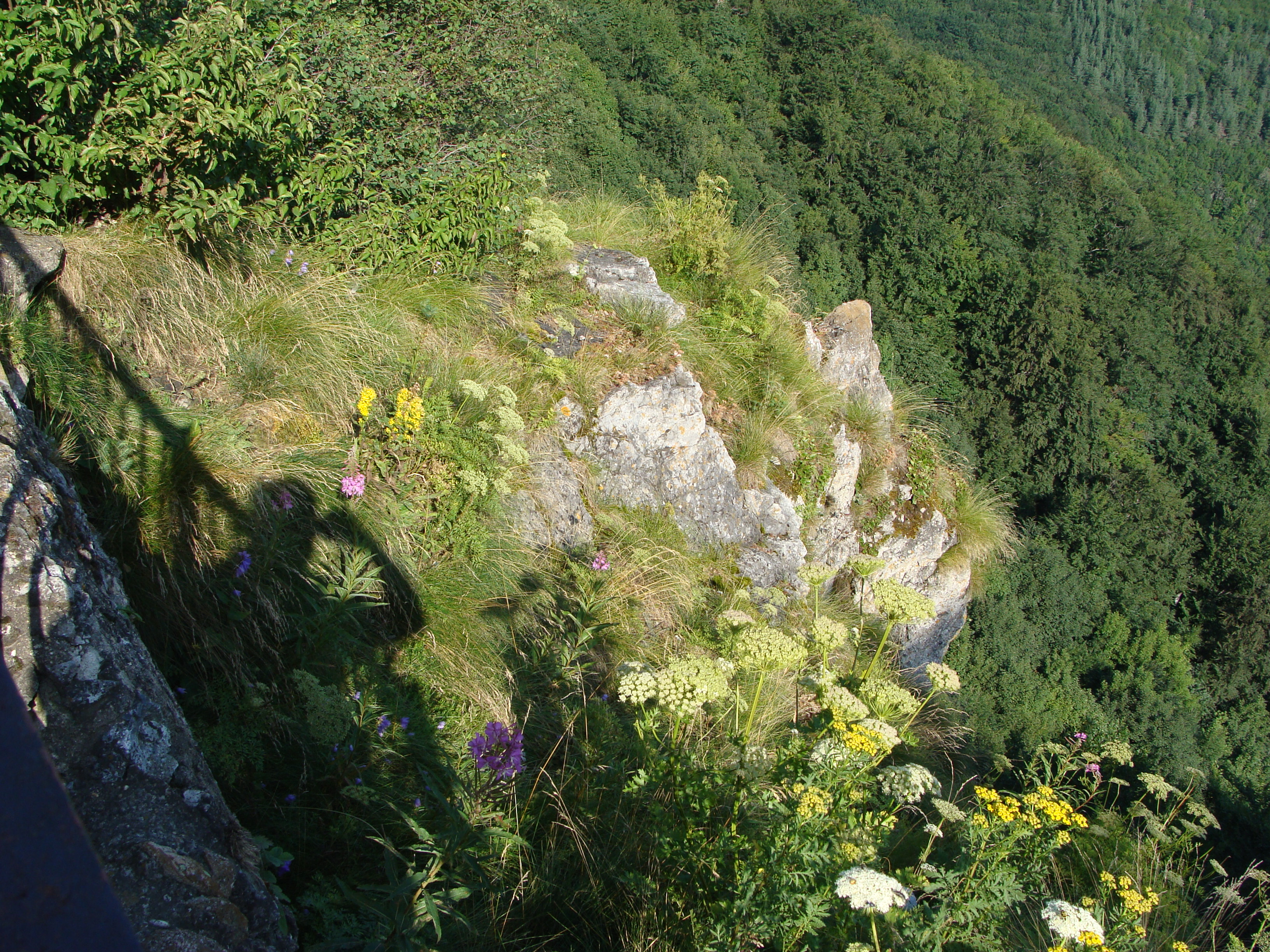
The "Shouting rock" in Bulgarka Nature Park

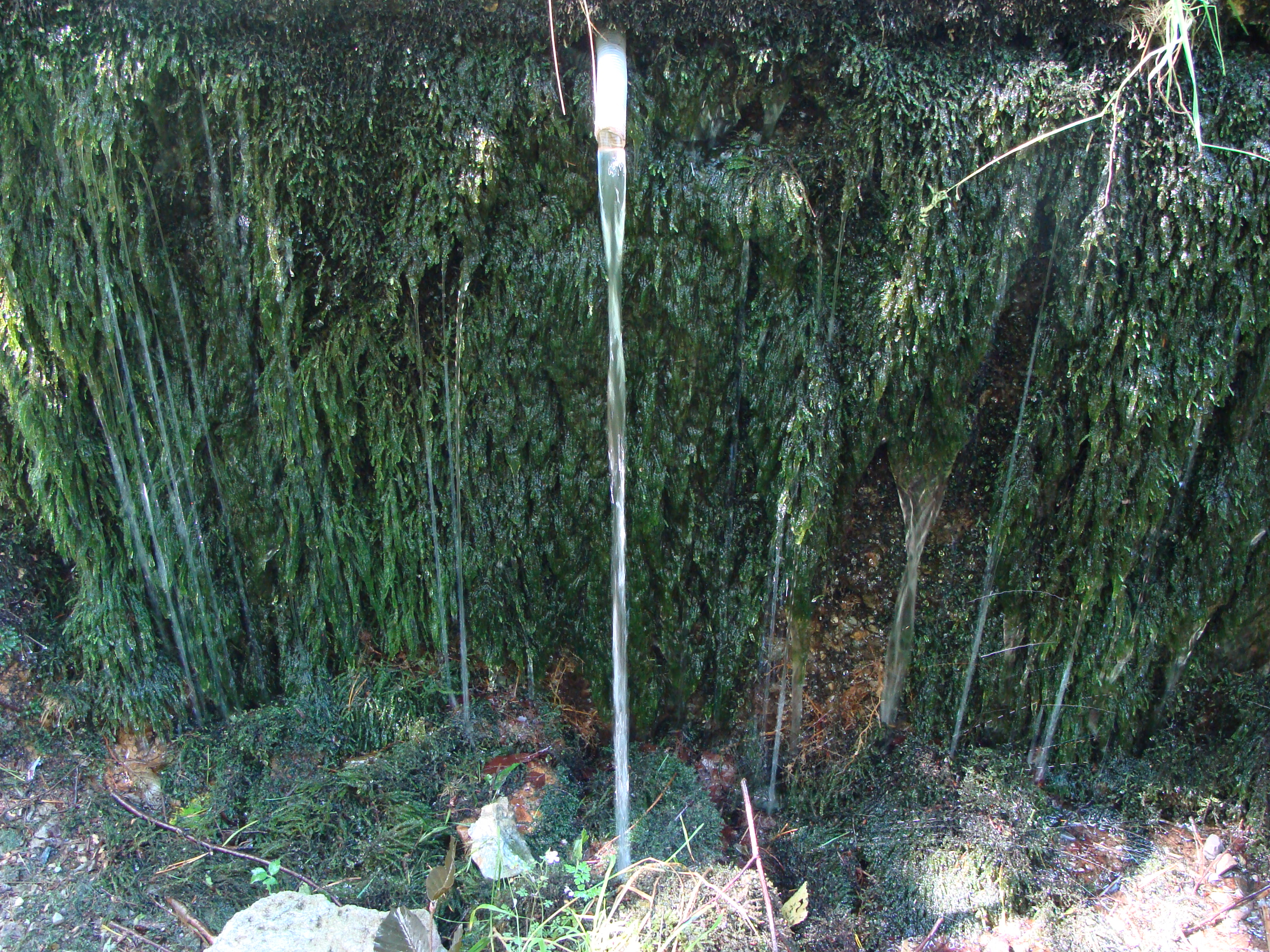
Forest spring in Bulgarka Nature Park

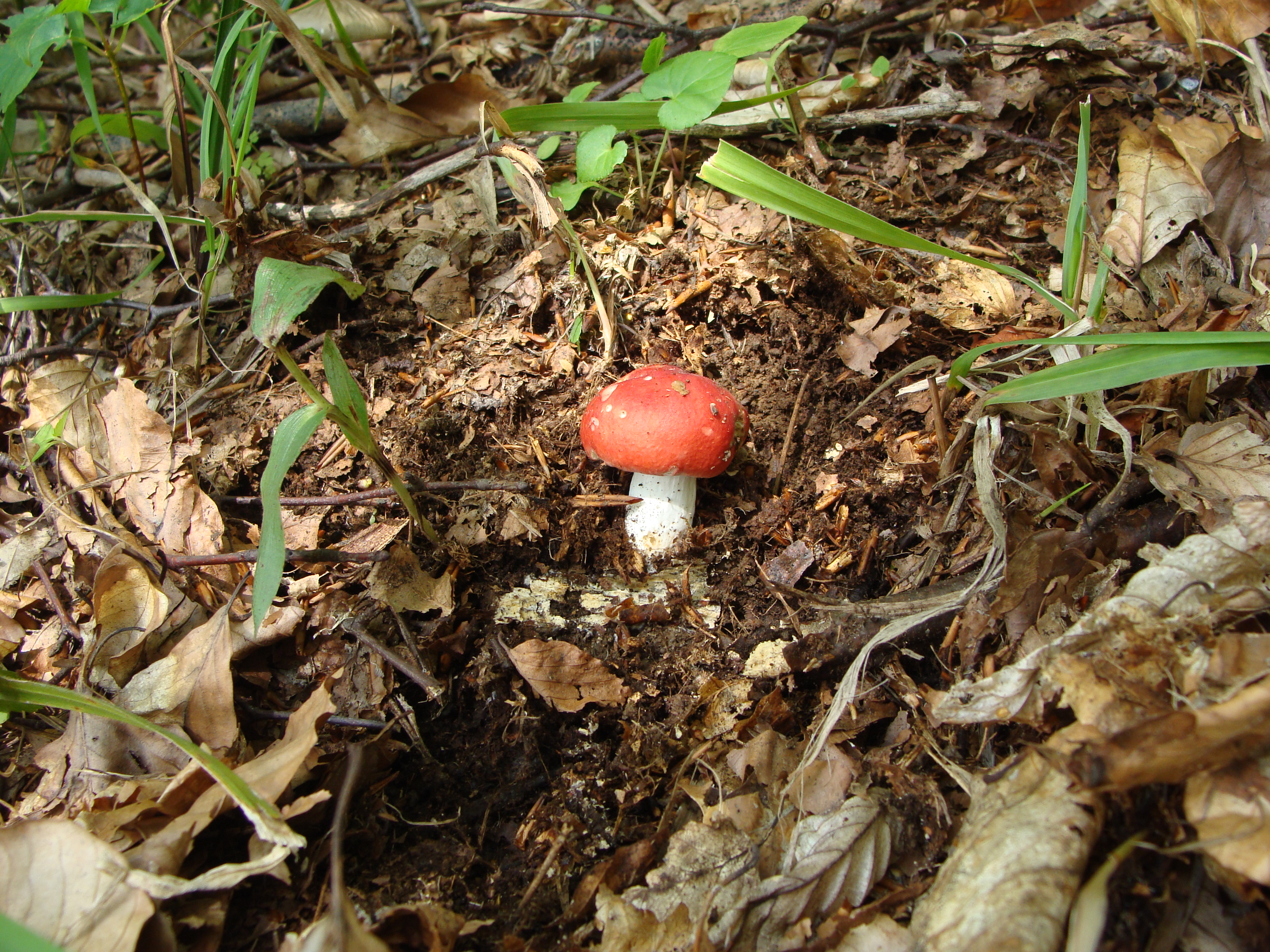
Mushroom in Bulgarka Nature Park

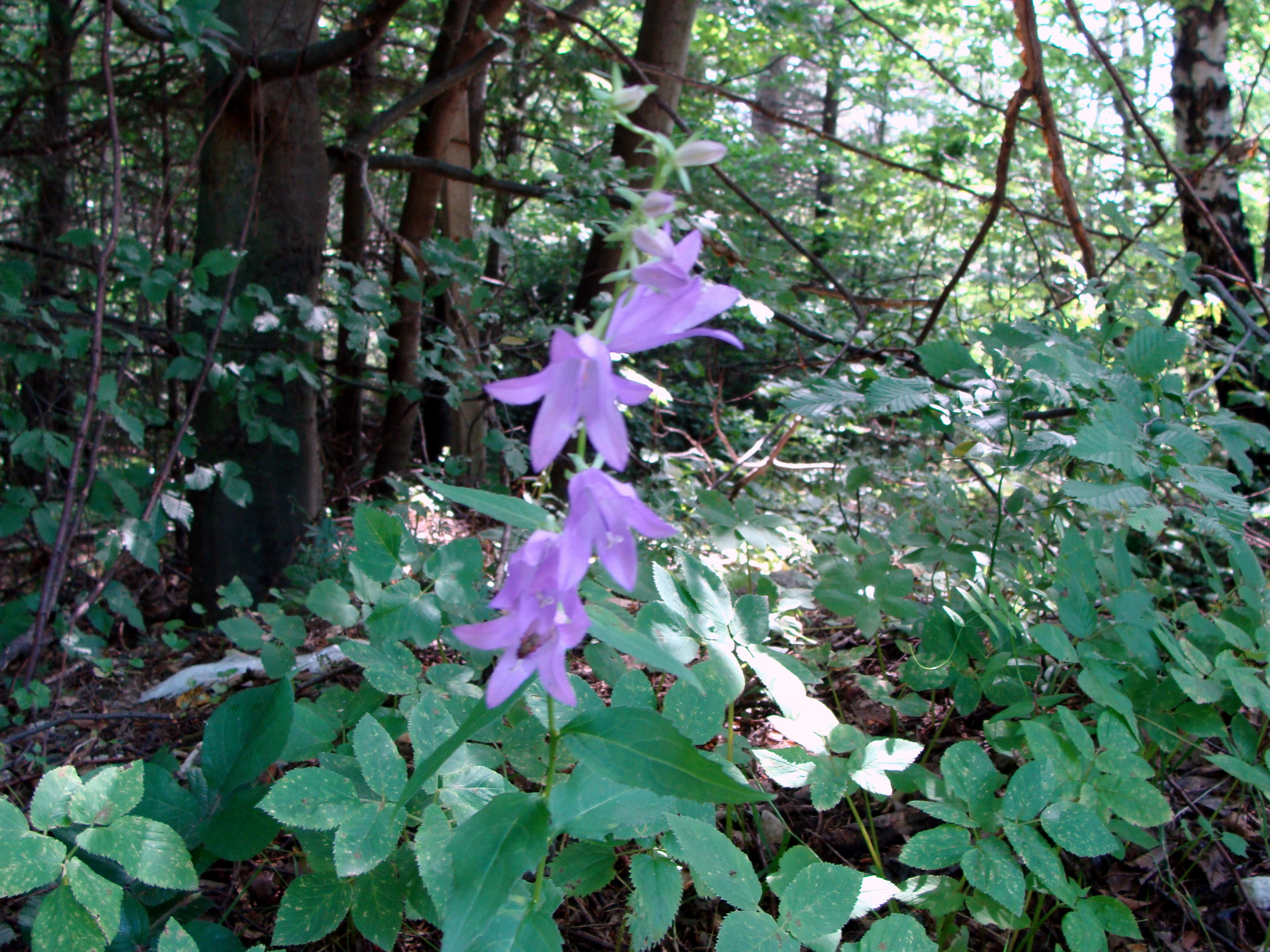
Forest flower in Bulgarka Nature Park

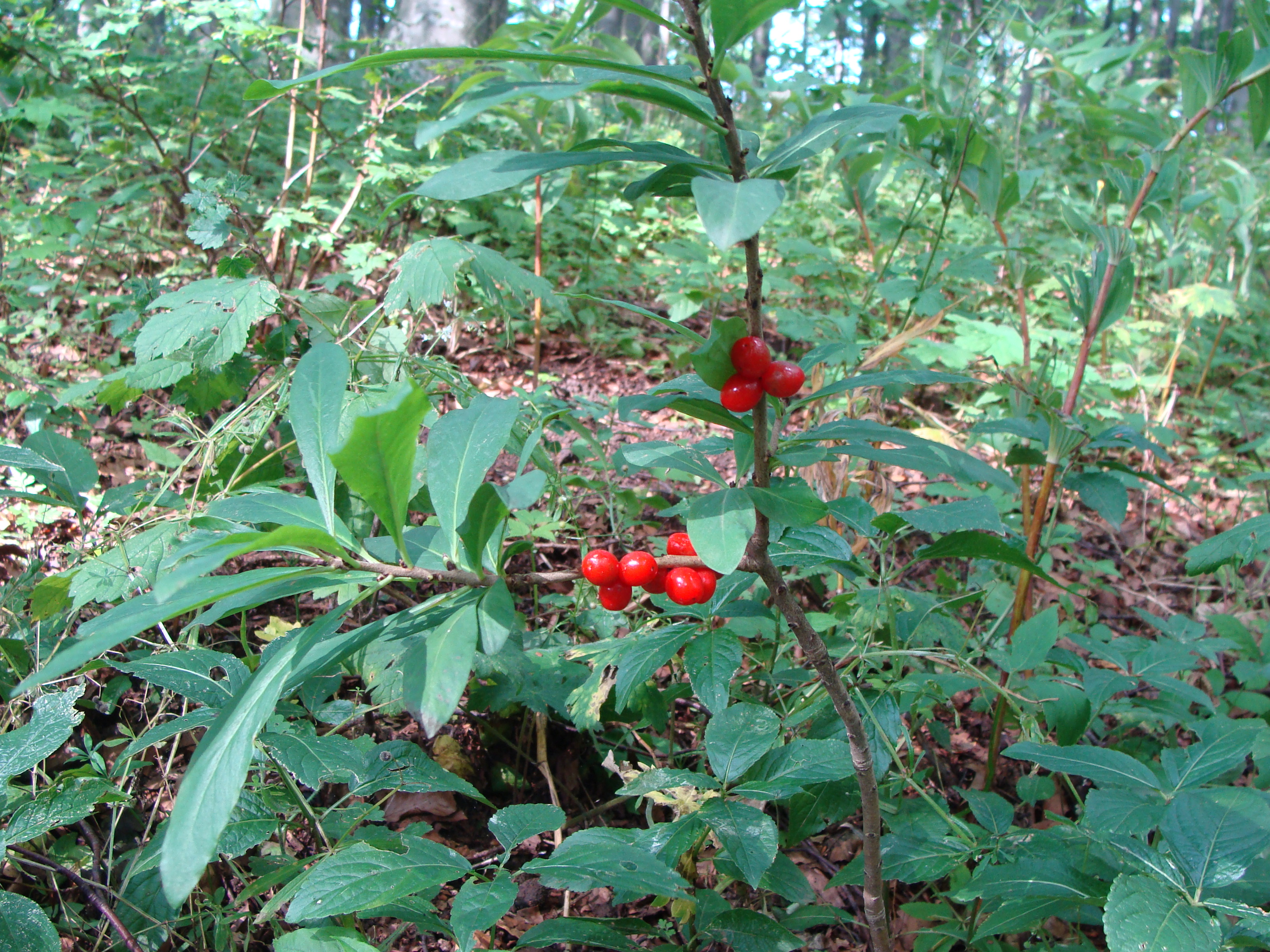
Forest fruits (Daphne mezereum) in Bulgarka Nature Park

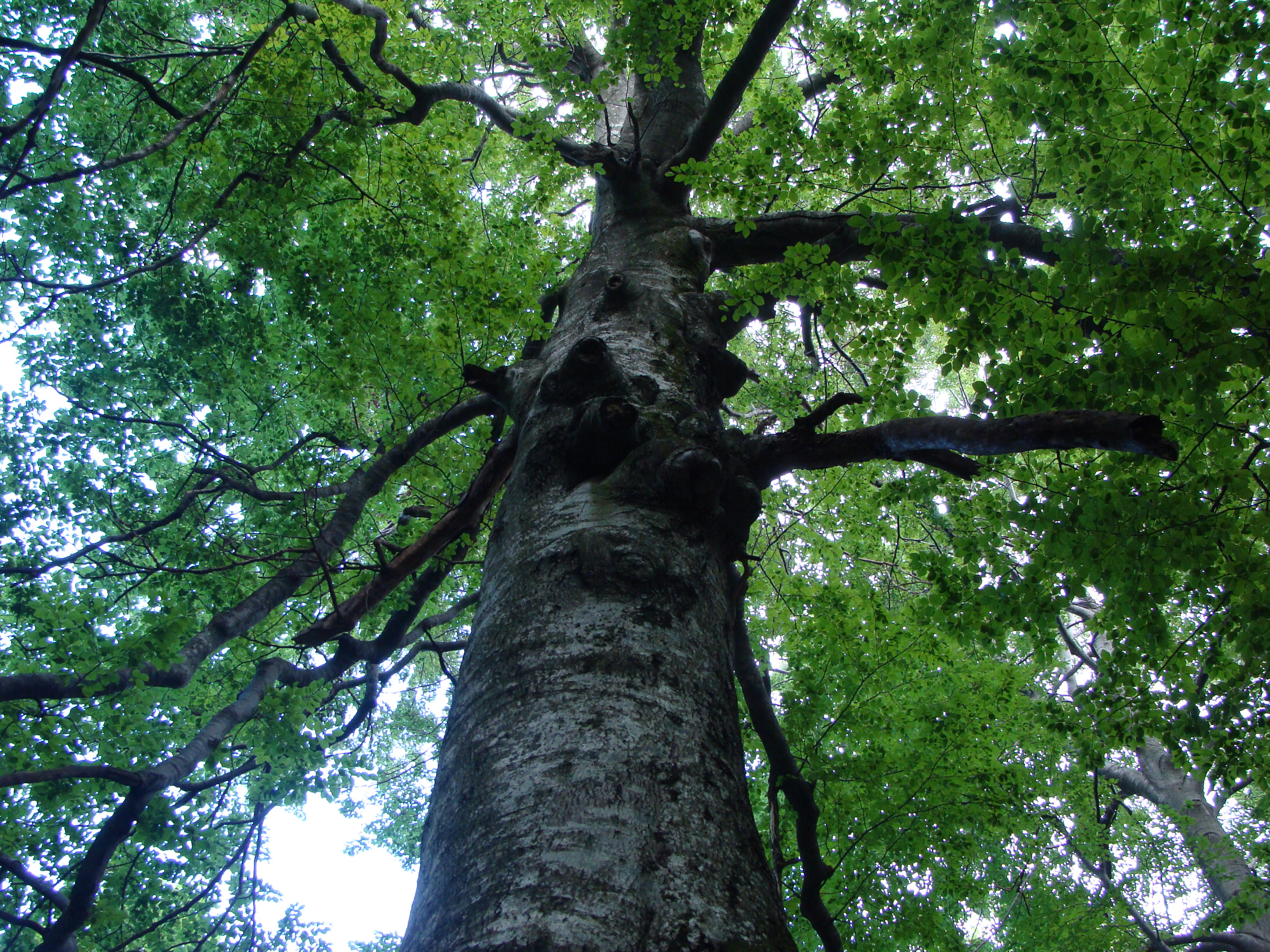
Centuries-old tree (beech-tree (Fagus)) in Bulgarka Nature Park

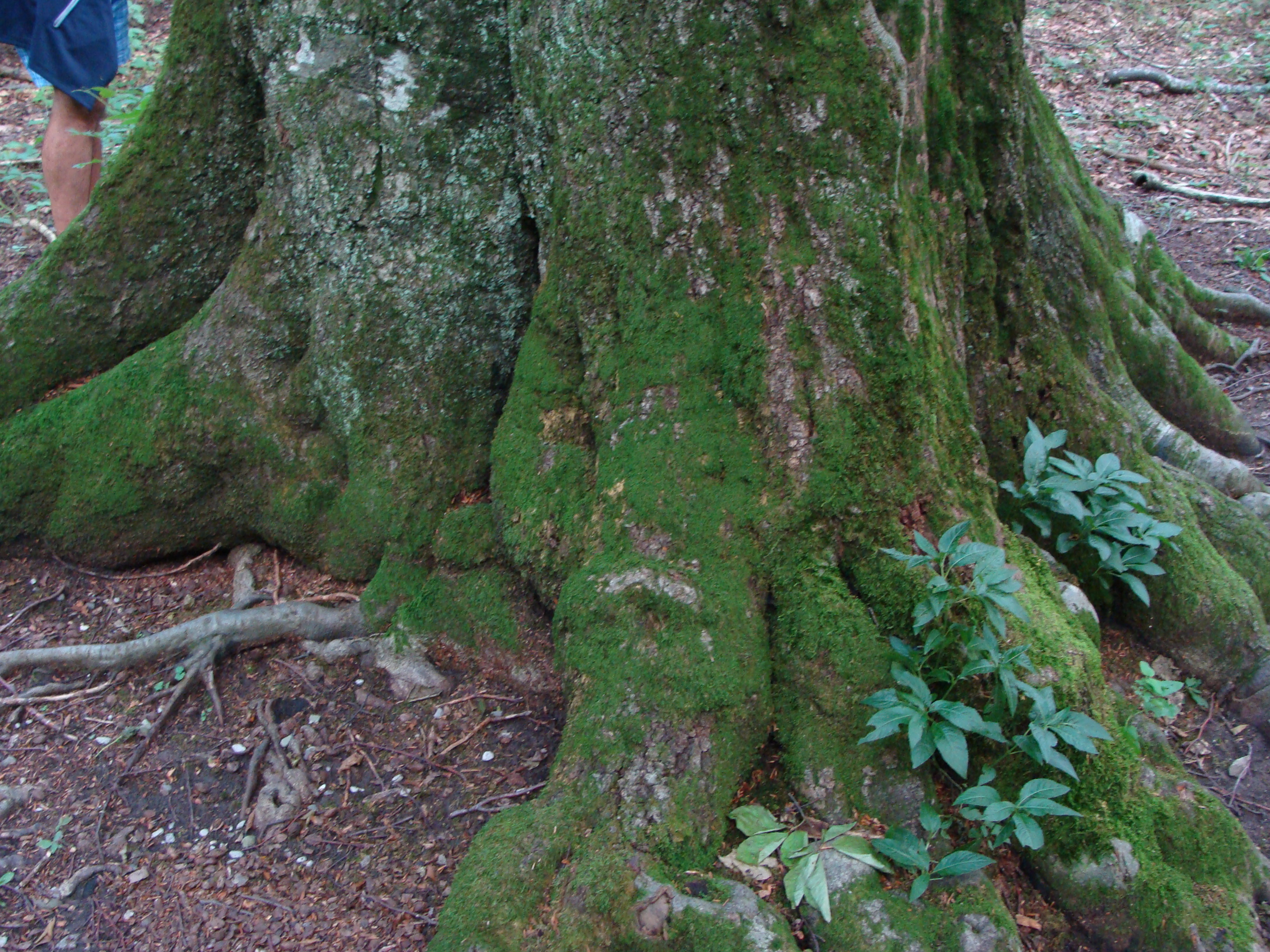
The roots of the centuries-old beech tree in Bulgarka Nature Park

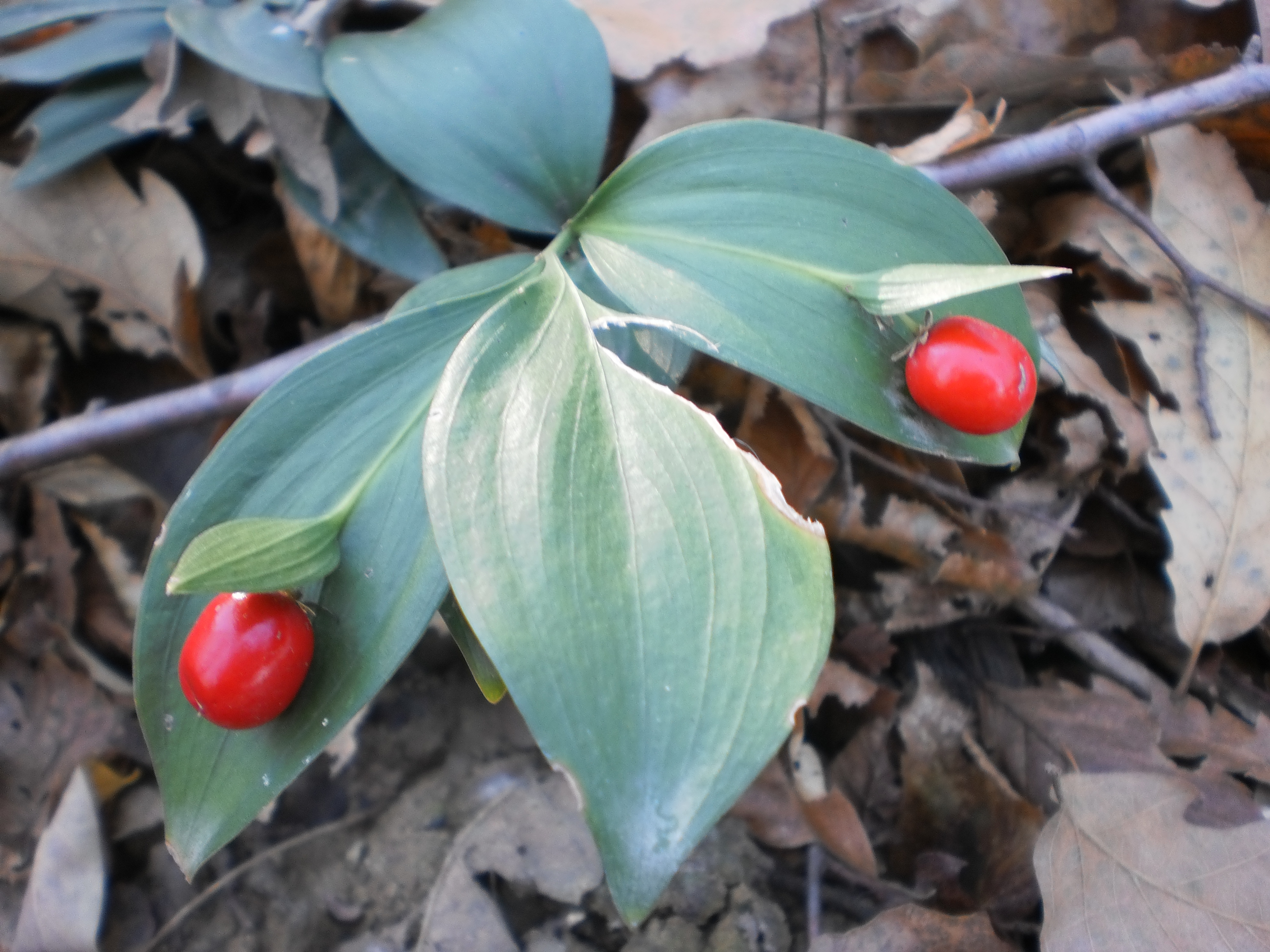
Ruscus hypoglossum L., plant under conservation and regulated use of nature in a forest near Gabrovo.

== See also ==
- Etar Architectural-Ethnographic Complex
- Uzana
