= Gabrovo =

Gabrovo Габрово
- city
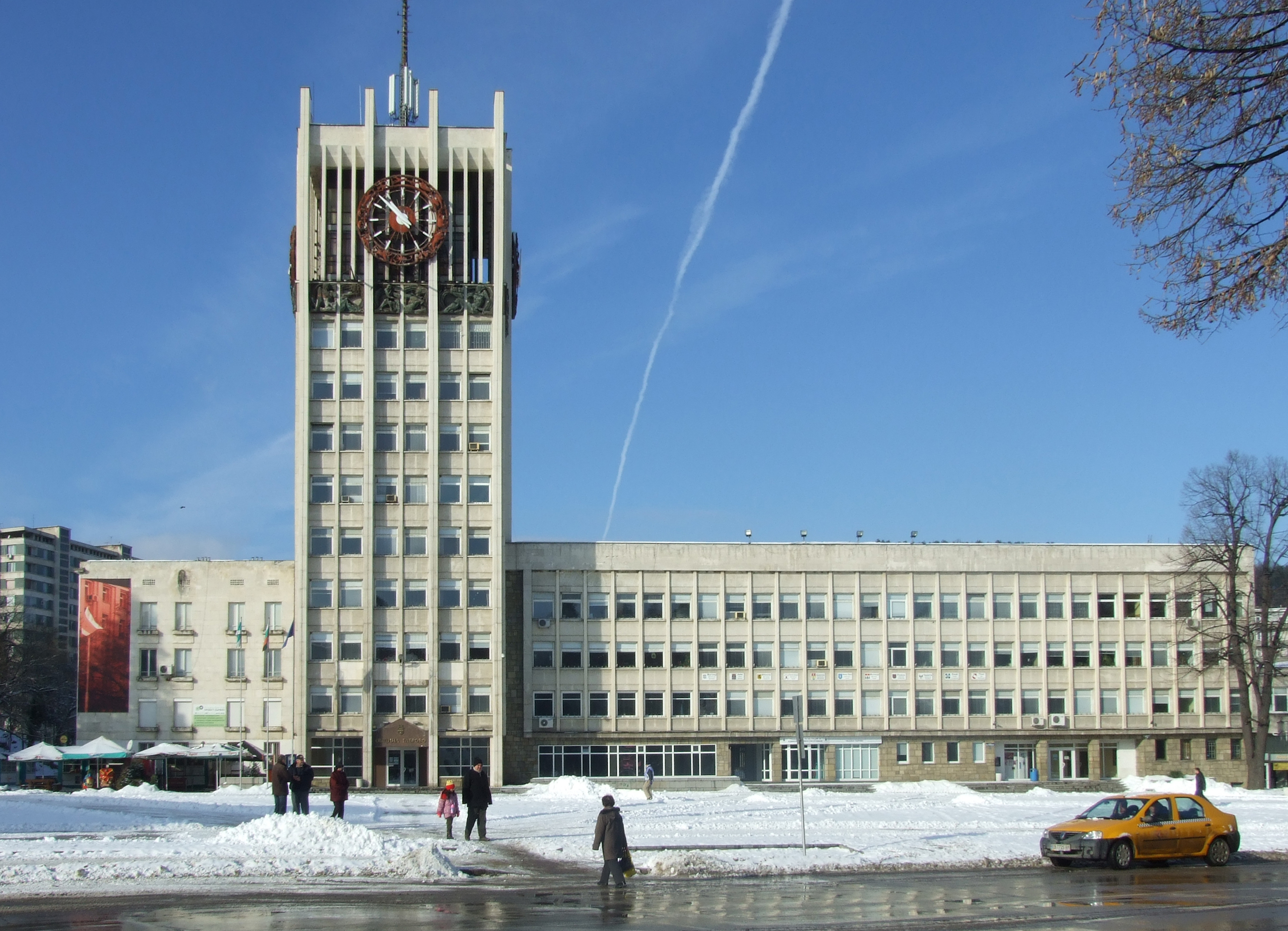
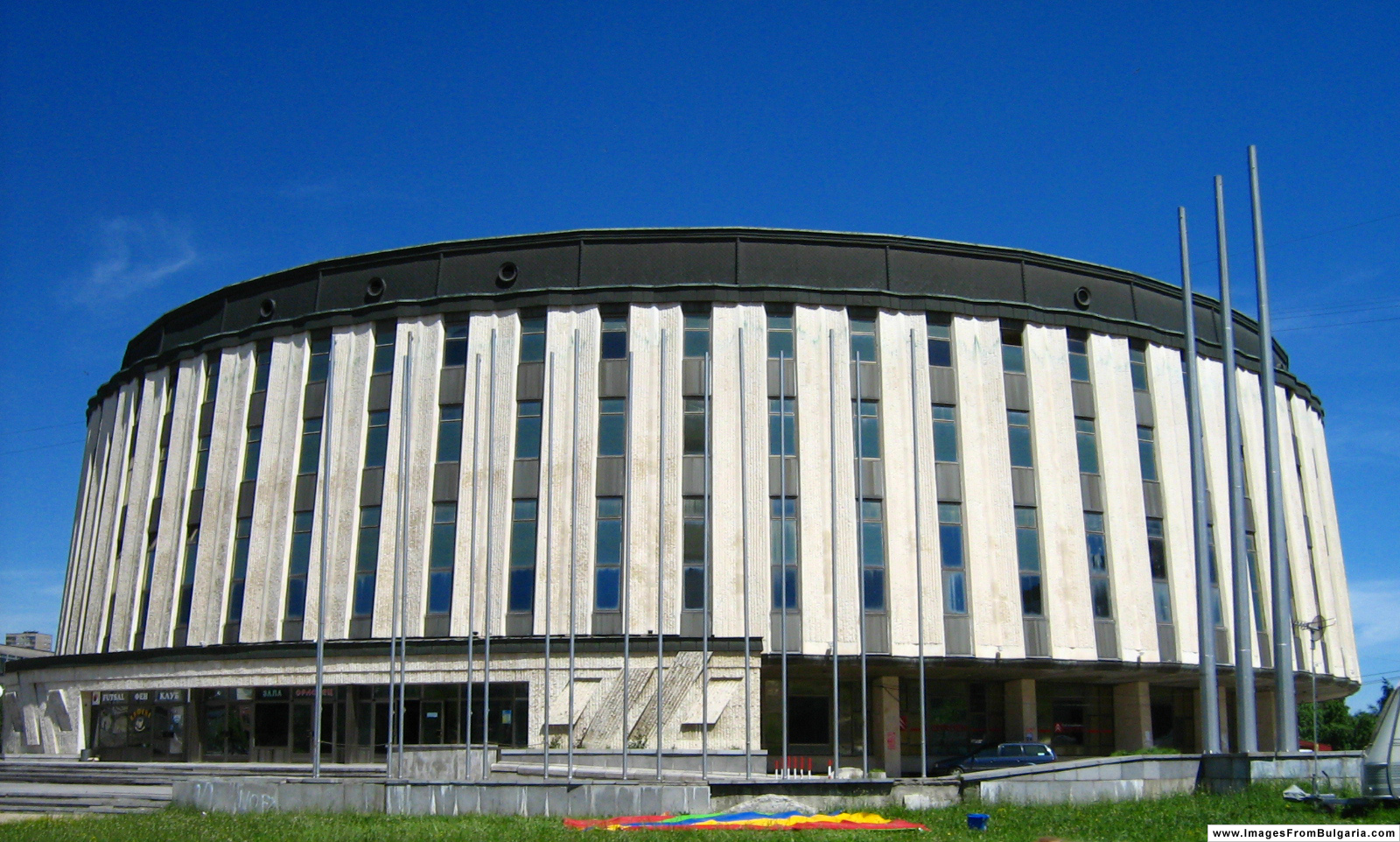
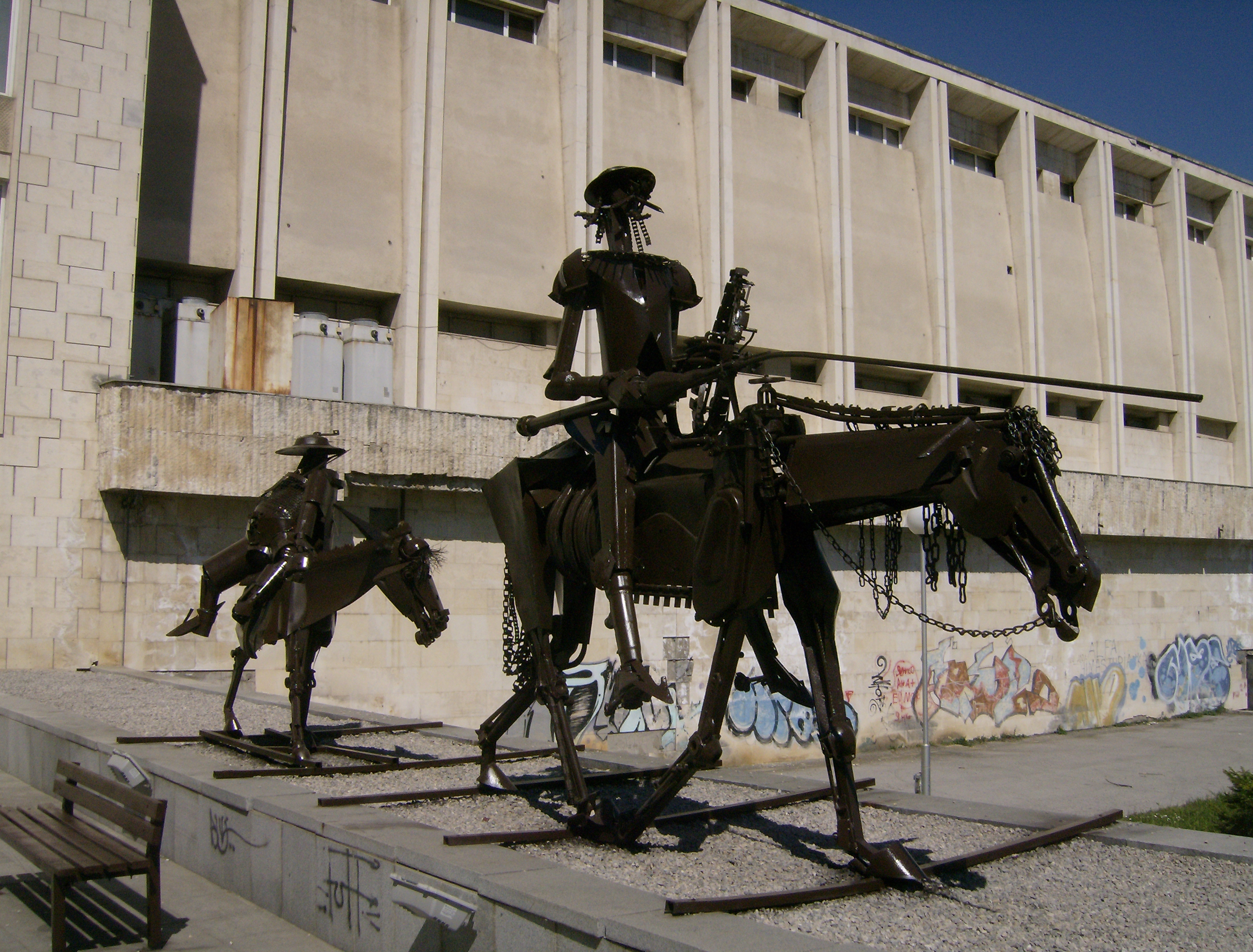
- From the top, Town Hall, Orlovets Hall, House of Humour and Satire

- Flag Coat of arms

- Location of Gabrovo Gabrovo (Balkans)
- Coordinates: 42°52′N 25°20′E
- Country: Bulgaria
- Province (Oblast): Gabrovo

Government
  - Mayor: Tanya Hristova

Area
  - city: 233.817 km^{2} (90.277 sq mi)
- Elevation: 392 m (1,286 ft)

Population (Census 2021)
  - city: 48,133
  - Density: 205.86/km^{2} (533.17/sq mi)
  - Urban: 54,608
- Time zone: UTC+2 (EET)
  - Summer (DST): UTC+3 (EEST)
- Postal Code: 5300
- Area code: 066
- Website: Official website

Gabrovo (Bulgarian: Габрово [ˈɡabrovo]) is a city in central northern Bulgaria, the administrative centre of Gabrovo Province.

Historical population
Year	Pop.	±%
1887	7,958	—
1910	8,423	+5.8%
1934	13,668	+62.3%
1946	21,180	+55.0%
1956	37,919	+79.0%
1965	57,805	+52.4%
1975	75,040	+29.8%
1985	81,415	+8.5%
1992	76,522	−6.0%
2001	67,065	−12.4%
2011	58,950	−12.1%
2021	45,940	−22.1%
Source: Censuses

It is situated at the foot of the central Balkan Mountains, in the valley of the Yantra River, and is known as an international capital of humour and satire (see Gabrovo humour), as well as noted for its Bulgarian National Revival architecture. Gabrovo is also known as the longest town in Bulgaria, stretching over 25 km along the Yantra, yet reaching only 1 km (0.6 mi) in width at places. The geographic center of Bulgaria - Uzana - is located near the town.

== Name ==
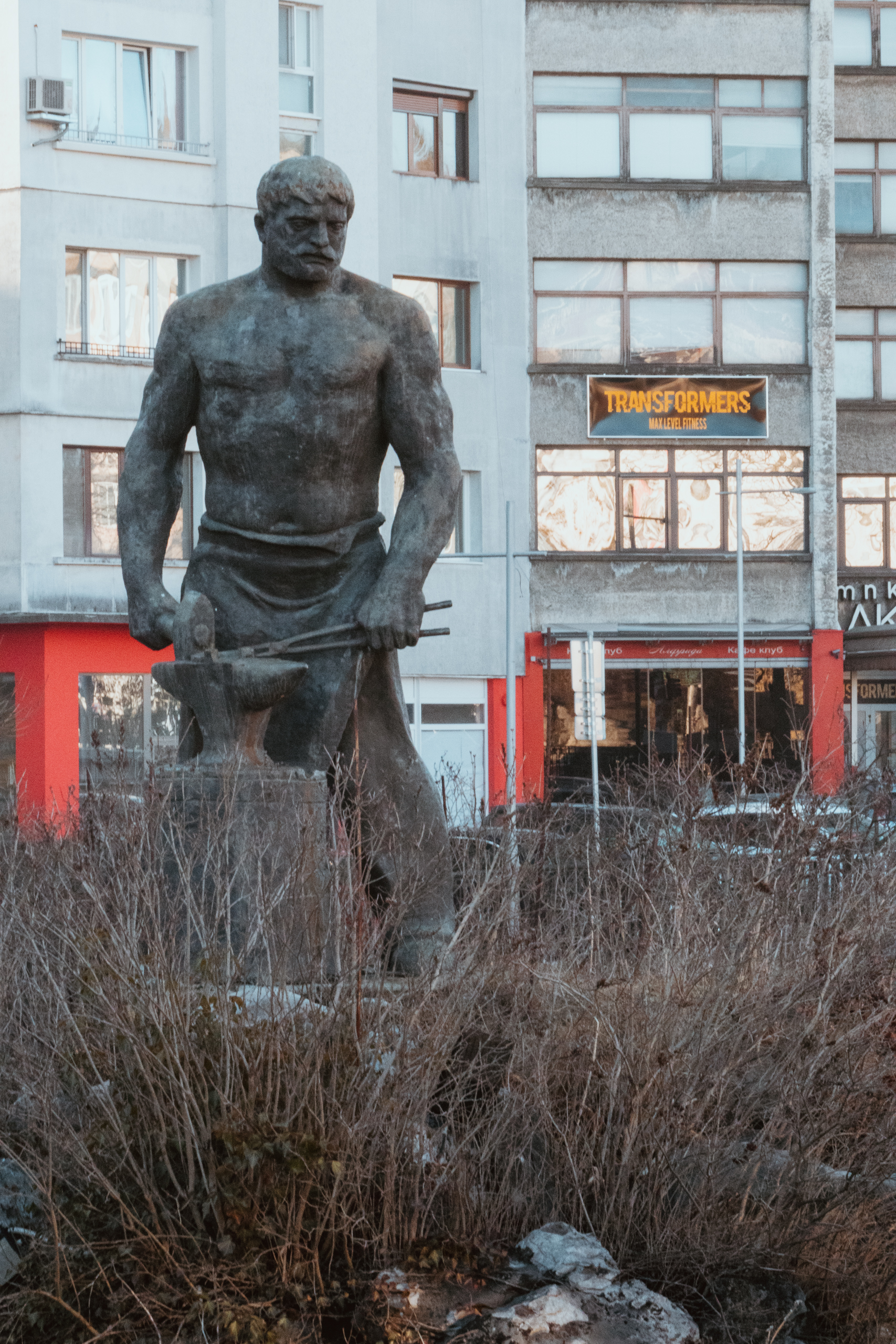
Statue of Racho Kovacha

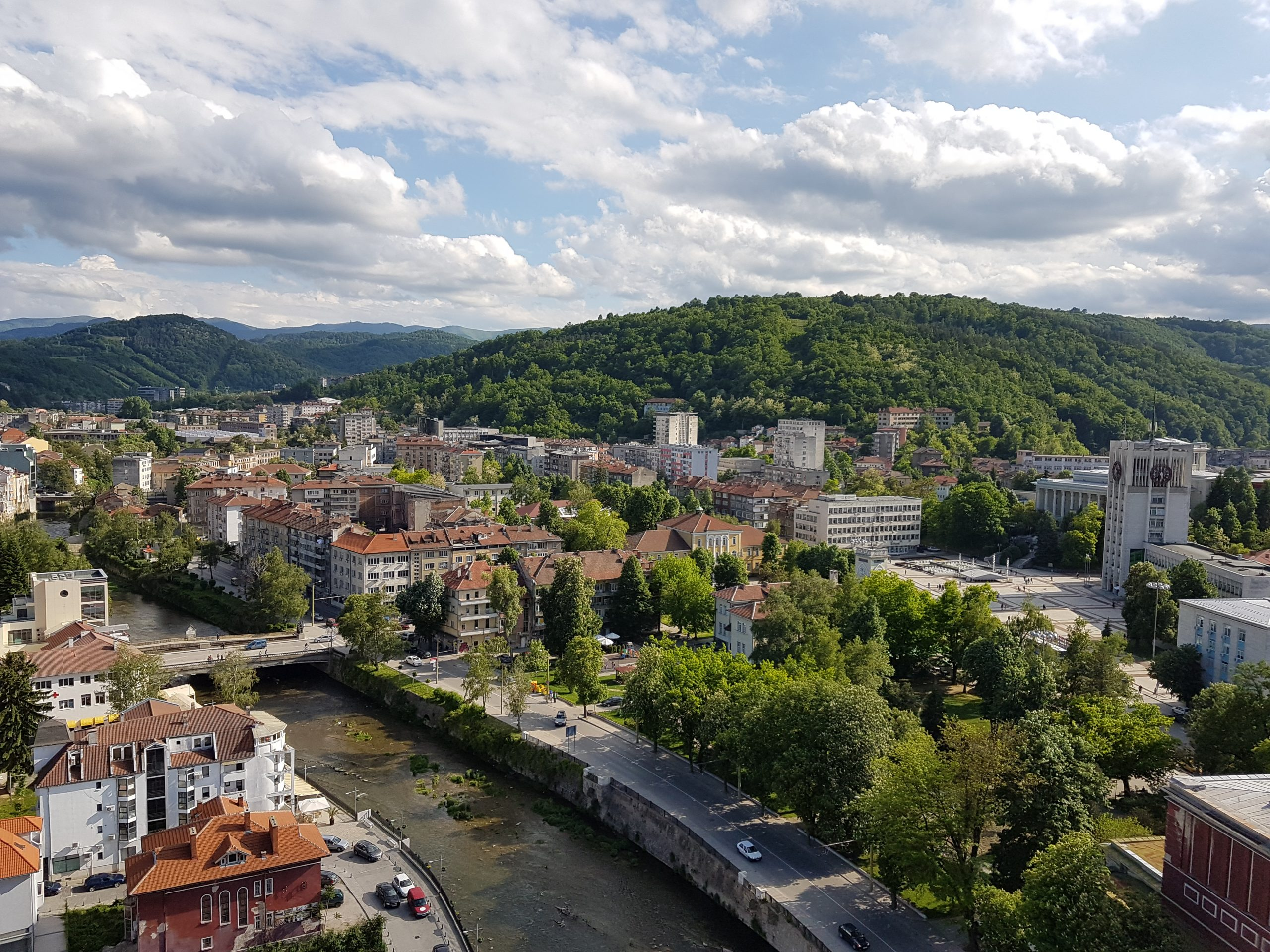
Aerial view of the city

According to the most widespread legend, Gabrovo was founded by a blacksmith named Racho, close to whose fireplace a hornbeam rose, so the settlement acquired its name, from the Slavic word gabar ("hornbeam") + the Slavic suffix -ovo.

== History ==
The area around Gabrovo, inhabited since the Neolithic, gained economic importance after Veliko Tarnovo became capital of the Second Bulgarian Empire in the 12th century. Craftsmanship and trade prospered due to the proximity to both the capital and the Balkan passes. Medieval Gabrovo was a small pass village of about 100 houses.

After the Ottoman invasion of the Balkans in the 14th century, the demographic position of Gabrovo changed significantly, as it was the only settlement in a considerably large geographic area and an attractive place for Bulgarians fleeing from the conquered capital and neighbouring fortresses. It turned from a village into a small town (palanka) and began to develop as an economic, cultural and spiritual centre.

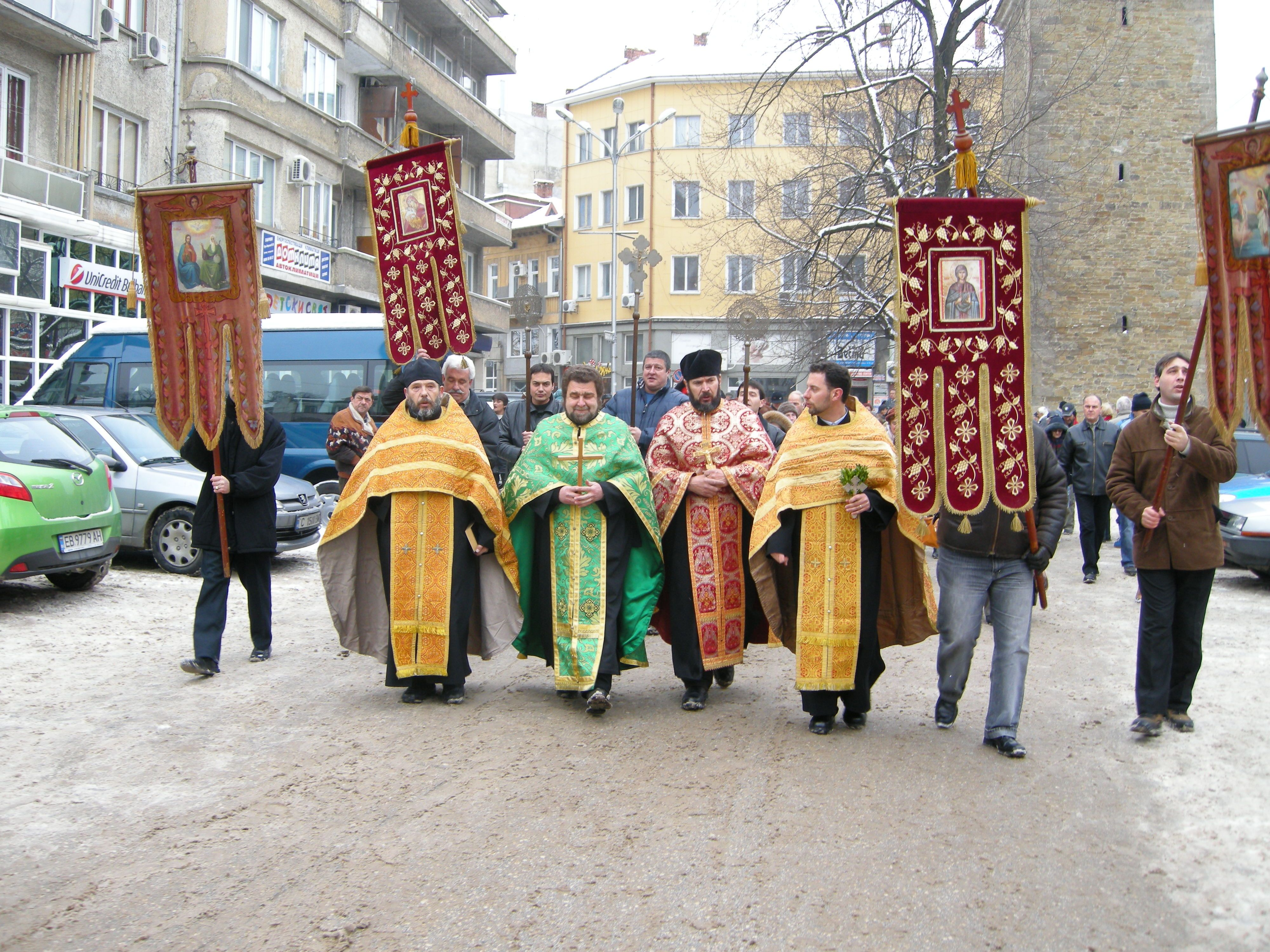
Bulgarian Orthodox Theophany Crucession in Gabrovo. The priests are going to throw a wooden cross in the Yantra. Believers will then jump into the icy waters to "save" the cross.

During Ottoman rule, the rich tradesmen spent plenty of resources for the small town's public planning. The first Bulgarian secular school, the Aprilov National High School, was founded in Gabrovo in 1835 with the aid of Vasil Aprilov and Nikolay Palauzov. Gabrovo was officially proclaimed a town by the Ottoman authority in May 1860. In the 1870s Felix Kanitz said that Gabrovo is "a big workshop" and that it is a "city that lives from the water," referring to widely used water power. The glory of the goods of Gabrovo became known throughout the Ottoman Empire, and beyond that, in Bucharest even nowadays there is a street named "Gabroveni".

Shortly before and after the Liberation of Bulgaria in 1878, Gabrovo developed as a centre of industry on the basis of its economic traditions. Joint-stock companies emerged, factories were constructed and connections to the large stock exchanges were created, prompting some to label the town "The Bulgarian Manchester".

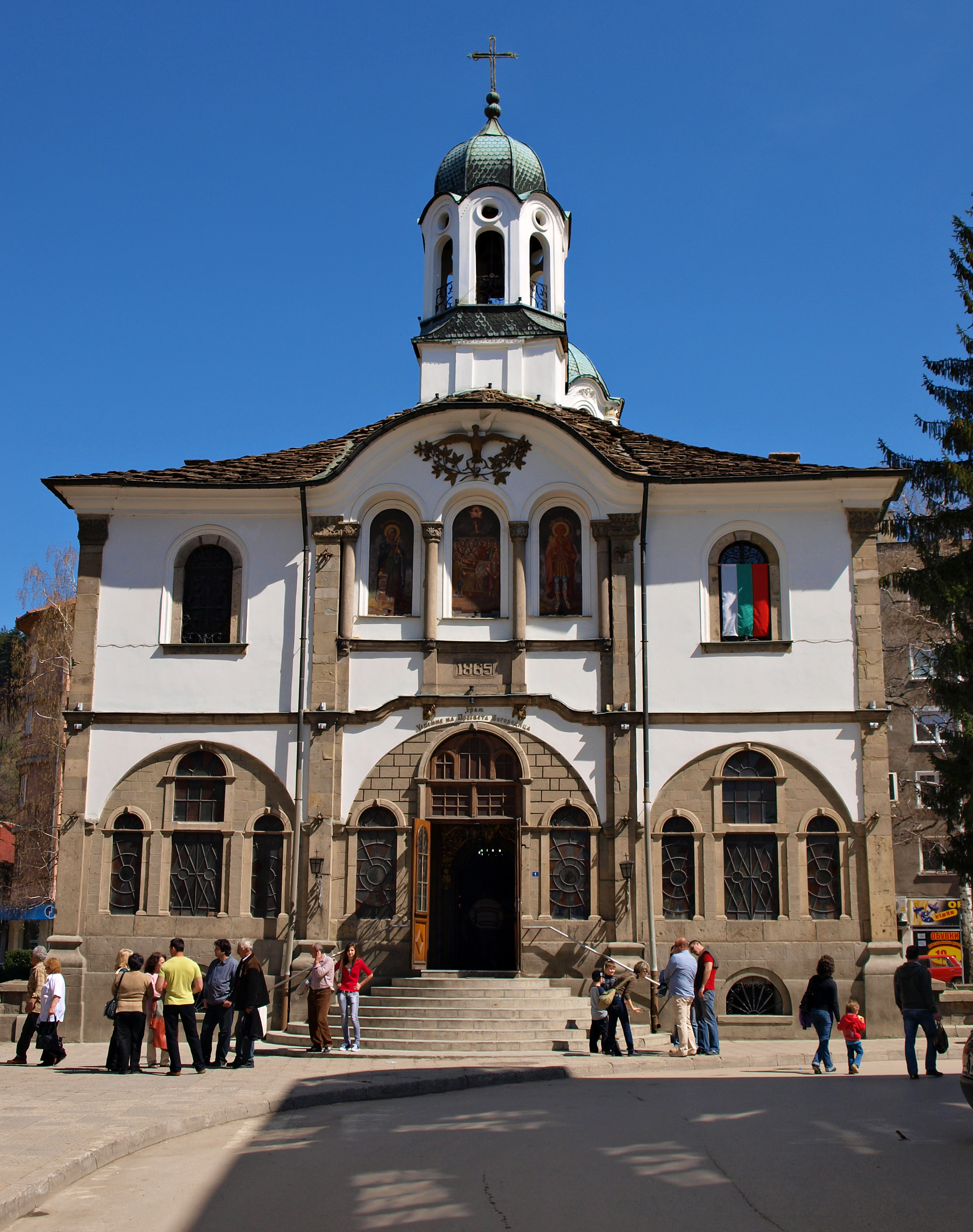
The Bulgarian National Revival church of Gabrovo, an architectural monument.

== Population ==
Gabrovo saw its most rapid growth in the post-World War II years, when its population doubled. Following general population trends in Bulgaria, the number of citizens started declining after the fall of Communism in the country. People started emigrating abroad or to the capital, Sofia. Currently, Gabrovo is more than 30,000 people short of its peak, achieved in the period 1985-1991 when the number of the residents exceeded 80,000. According to Census 2011, as of February 2011, the population of the town was 58,950 inhabitants.

=== Ethnic, linguistic and religious composition ===
According to the latest 2011 census data, the individuals declared their ethnic identity were distributed as follows:

- Bulgarians: 54,227 (97.9%)
- Turks: 473 (0.9%)
- Roma: 343 (0.6%)
- Others: 193 (0.3%)
- Indefinable: 151 (0.3%)
  - Undeclared: 3,563 (6.0%)

Total: 58,950

The ethnic composition of Gabrovo Municipality is 60,207 Bulgarians, 504 Turks and 367 Roma among others.

== Culture ==
Internationally known as a centre of humour and satire, Gabrovo has two theatres, the Racho Stoyanov Drama Theatre and the puppet theatre, a House of Humour and Satire that serves as a cultural institute, a centre, museum and gallery to popularise comic art. There is a cinema, Aleko Cinema, and museums and memorial houses in the town and around it, most notably the Etar Architectural-Ethnographic Complex and the National Museum of Education at the Aprilov National High School.

On a Saturday around the week of May 21, Gabrovo hosts an annual Carnival of Humor and Satire with the slogan in Bulgarian “Da izkukurigame ot smyah” (translating to "Let`s go nuts from laughter"). On the day of the carnival, the streets of Gabrovo town are overflowing with fun characters like masked musketeers, bullfighters, shamans, gypsies, and much more. The carnival is also popular for its use of traditional Balkan songs, folklore choreography, and a rich display of Gabrovo humour and culture.

A planetarium is in operation.

== Tourism ==
Places of interest in Gabrovo include the House of Humour and Satire and Aprilov National High School. In Gabrovo Province sites include architectural reserve Bozhentsi. Hiking is widely available in the Central Balkan National Park and in the Bulgarka Nature Park, itself home to Ethnographic Complex Etara, Dryanovo Monastery, Sokolski Monastery, Shipka Pass, and the Uzana area. For admirers of historical tourism Shipka Memorial is a must-see. Gabrovo is member of the Creative Tourism Network ®.

== Sports ==
- The town's most successful sports club is FC Yantra Gabrovo, which was founded in 1919.
- The town also has long handball traditions.
- About 25 km (16 mi) from the town in Central Balkan Mountains is located the renowned winter resort Uzana.

== Honors ==
A minor planet 2206 Gabrova discovered on April 1, 1976, by Soviet astronomer Nikolai Stepanovich Chernykh is named in honor of the town.

Gabrovo Knoll on Livingston Island in the South Shetland Islands, Antarctica is named after Gabrovo.

== Notable people ==
- Vasil Aprilov (1789–1847) - revivalist and educator; founder of the first secular school in Bulgaria
- Ivan Hadji Berov (1858–1934) - industrialist- lit the first light bulb in Bulgaria - erected the first hydro electric power plant in Gabrovo
- Tsanko Dyustabanov (1844–1876) - revolutionary
- Teodor Kabakchiev (born 1998), professional motorcycle racer
- Ivan Kolchev Kalpazanov (1835–1889) - industrialist, ancestor of the modern industry in Gabrovo and Kingdom of Bulgaria (1882)
- Vasil Nikolov Karagiosov (1856–1938) - teacher, industrialist, politician, German vicecouncul, monk in the Zograf monastery, Mount Athos, Greece
- Nikolay Palauzov (1821–1899) - merchant, donated money for the Gabrovian school
- Petar Rúsеv - father of former Brazilian president Dilma Rousseff
- Tota Venkova (1855 – 1921), first native-born Bulgarian woman physician. The regional hospital in Gabrovo is named after her.
- Christo Yavashev (1935–2020) - installation artist

== Education ==
=== University ===
Gabrovo has one of the biggest technical universities in Bulgaria, the Technical University of Gabrovo, which opened in 1964. The idea for the university came from the 1840s. Today the university has about 5400 students; around 60 of them are from other countries.

== Twin towns – sister cities ==
Gabrovo is twinned with:

- Aalst, Belgium
- Chernihiv, Ukraine
- Kumanovo, North Macedonia
- Mittweida, Germany
- Mogilev, Belarus
- Mytischi, Russia
- Nowy Sącz, Poland
- Panevėžys, Lithuania
- Petah Tikva, Israel
- Prešov, Slovakia
- Shaki, Azerbaijan
- Sisak, Croatia
- Thun, Switzerland

== See also ==
- Gabrovo humour
- Sirmani
- Uzana
