= House of Humour and Satire =

Coordinates: 42°52′47″N 25°19′5″E

The House of Humour and Satire (Bulgarian: Дом на Хумора и Сатирата; Dom na Humora i Satirata) in Gabrovo, Bulgaria, is an exposition of traditional local humour art, including cartoons, photographs, paintings, sculptures, and verbal humour. The House combines features of a museum and an art gallery. The city of Gabrovo is also known as an international capital of humour and satire. Its motto is "The world lasts because it laughs".

House of Humour and Satire

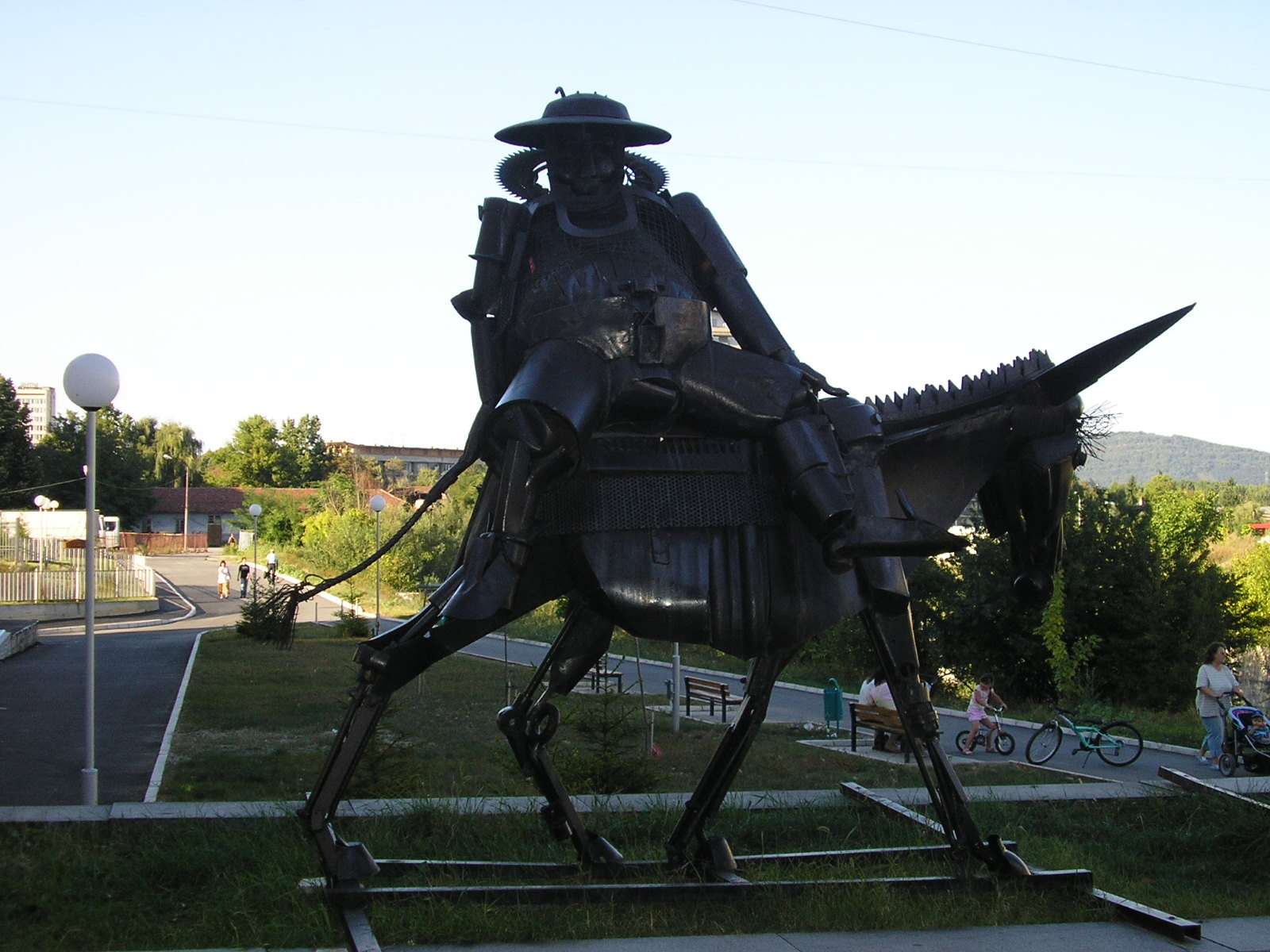

== Collection and activities ==
The House of Humour and Satire is a cultural center in Gabrovo. Its main objectives are the management of its collection and hosting of permanent and temporary exhibitions of humorous and satirical works of art from Bulgaria and the world, publishing activity and organisation of contests and festivals of humour.

The following events are held in the House of Humour and Satire:

- International biennial of humour and satire in the arts (IBHSA)
- April 1 - Birthday of the House of Humor and Satire.

The House's art collection Humour of the peoples includes over 51 620 works of art by over 9000 authors from 173 countries around the world: among them approximately 22 000 caricatures, over 3000 satirical graphics, over 1000 picture works, around 1000 sculptures, around 9500 photos, over 200 posters, over 300 carnival masks and costumes. Another part of the museum collection is the specialist library of 25 000 titles and 1000 volumes of periodicals in 35 languages. A big part of those works of art are obtained through donations.

This abundance gives the opportunity for constant update of the expositions, and the mounting of topical expositions of various author and themes. For over 35 years of existence, the HSS has organised over 500 topical, group, individual and traveling exhibits in Europe, Africa, North America and the Middle East.

The HSS is a unique cultural institute of humor and satirical art with an international resonance. It was created on the site of an old leather and tanning factory on April 1, 1972. The architectural design was by Karl Kandulkov. It is a proud successor of the local folklore humor and carnival traditions of Gabrovo - the Bulgarian capital of humor.

The HSS embarks on various activities - it is a museum of laughter, a gallery of the international humorous art, an information center, a place for recreation, a tourist attraction for both the young and the elderly.

Its emblem is the Earth's globe with cat eyes and ears, to "see and hear" the world's humor, and invokes the mascot of Gabrovo - the cat. The goal of the House of humour and satire is to collect, show and popularise the humour of the people in the fields of fine arts, literature and folklore, photography, poster, merry holidays and masquerade traditions around the world.

The House of humour and satire is a veritable palace with its 10 exhibition halls (totalling some 8000 sq. metres), a library, a recording studio, a conference hall, a souvenir stand, a night cafe, and a free parking lot. The House of Humour and Satire offers its guests four floors of permanent expositions (How Gabrovo Became a Capital of Humor, Garden Town, Satire and Propaganda, Mirror Room), temporary exhibitions of humorous art, copper bells, a huge figure of the Gabrovo cat with its severed tail, etc., and a rich museum shop with unique and various products.

Located in the center of Gabrovo, close to the bus station and train station, the House of Humour and Satire welcomes its visitors with happy greetings of favorite humorous characters, whose sculptures are shown in the Park of Laughter. Among them are:

- the famously witty character Hitar Petar (Crafty Peter);
- the greatest comedian of all time Charlie Chaplin;
- the inseparable couple of Don Quixote and Sancho Panza;
- a huge sun dial;
- the strange metal Tower of Babylon.

== See also ==
- Gabrovo humour
