= Technical University of Gabrovo =

- Технически университет Габрово; Tehnicheski universitet Gabrovo
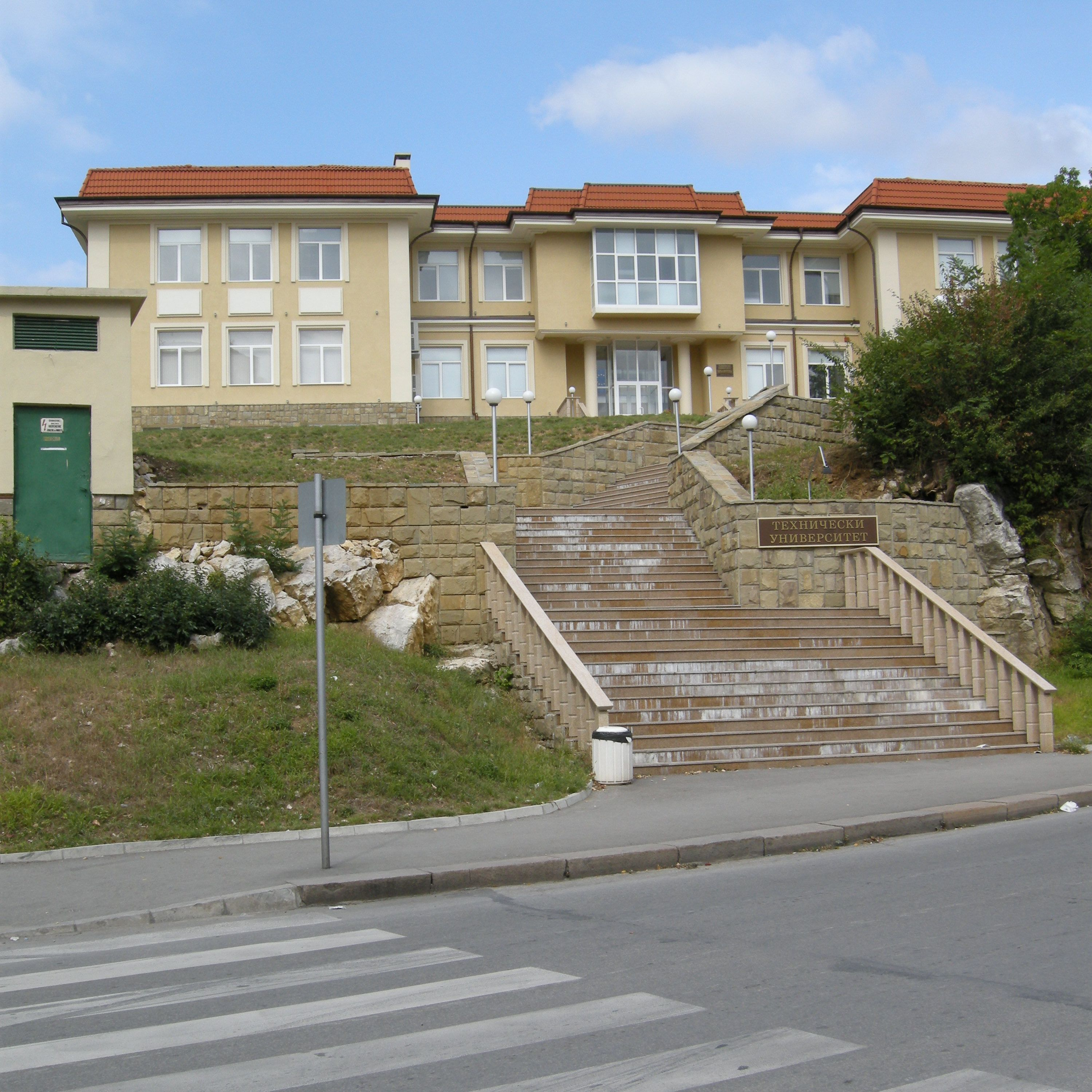
- Technical University of Gabrovo Library building
- Type: Public
- Established: 1964
- Affiliations: Balkan Universities Network
- Rector: Raycho Ilarionov
- Students: ~8000
- Location: Gabrovo, Bulgaria; 42.8755°N 25.3164°E
- Website: www.tugab.bg

The Technical University of Gabrovo is a state university in Gabrovo, Bulgaria, founded in 1964.

== Faculties ==
- Faculty of Electrical Engineering
- Faculty of Mechanical Engineering and Technologies
- Faculty of Economy

== See also ==
- Balkan Universities Network
- List of universities in Bulgaria
- Gabrovo
