= Sokolski Monastery =

Monastery

Coordinates: 42°47′56″N 25°20′9″E

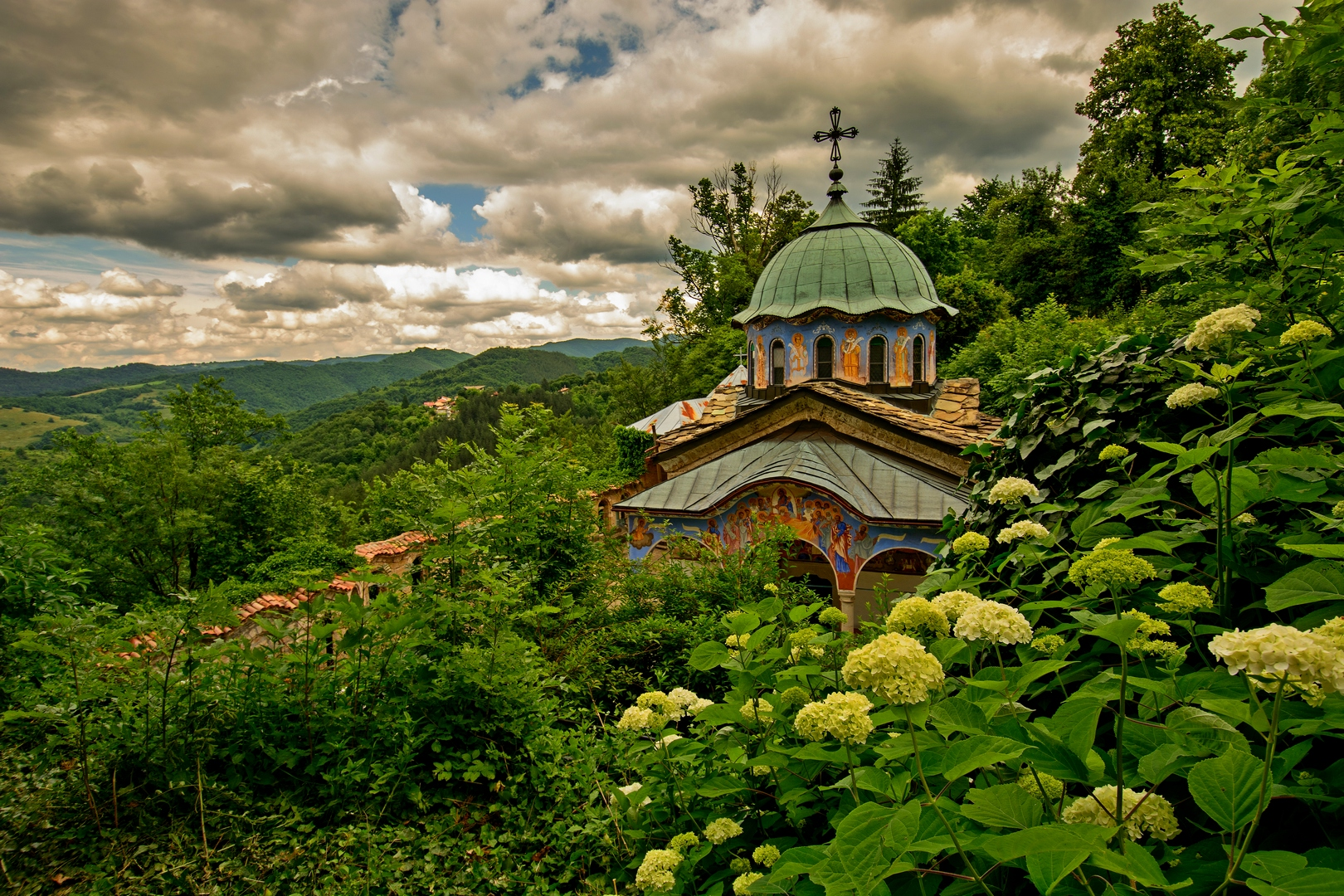

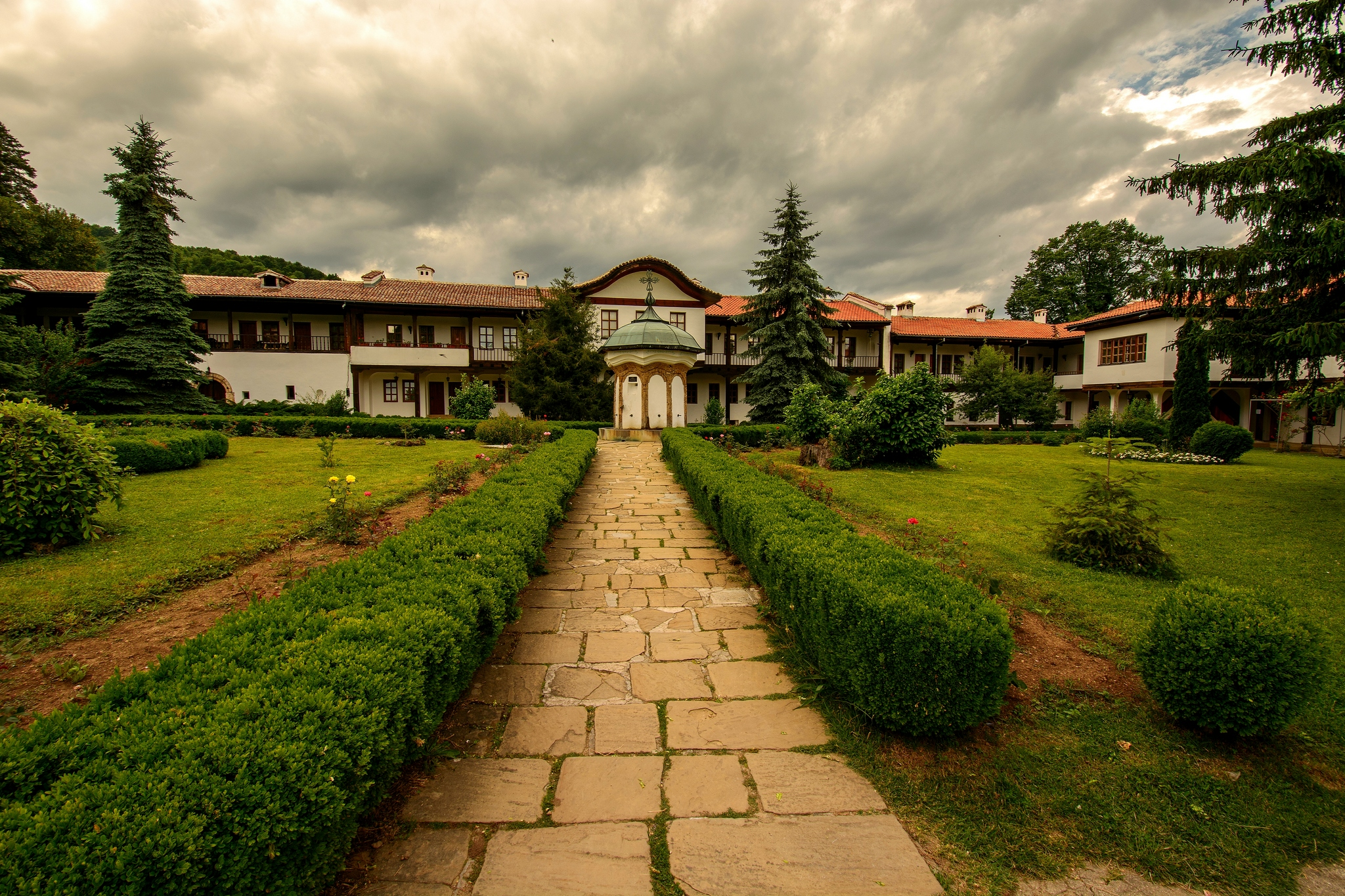
The yard with the fountain

The Sokolski Monastery is a Bulgarian Orthodox monastery founded in 1833 and named after its founder Yosif Sokolski. It is located 15 km southwest of Gabrovo on the northern slopes of the Balkan Mountains in the Bulgarka Nature Park and is close to the Sokolovo cave.

Originally, a small wooden church was built in 1833 and the frescoes were finished a year later. Hristo Tsokev, a Gabrovo-born artist, donated the church icon, which represents the Virgin Mary and Christ and is considered to be miraculous. In 1862, Father Paul Zograf and his son Nikola from the village of Shipka decorated the church with frescoes.

The monastery has a big yard surrounded by residential and utility buildings. In the centre of the yard, in 1865 the master Kolyu Ficheto constructed a big stone fountain with eight taps. The whole monastery was built during the Bulgarian National Revival with the strong support of the people of Gabrovo and the local villages.

The monastery played an important role during the April Uprising. In this monastery, the leader Tsanko Dyustabanov formed a group of volunteers for the resistance. In a short period of time during the Russo-Turkish War of 1877-78 the monastery was a hospital.

The Sokolski Monastery was declared a historical site in 1973.

== Gallery ==
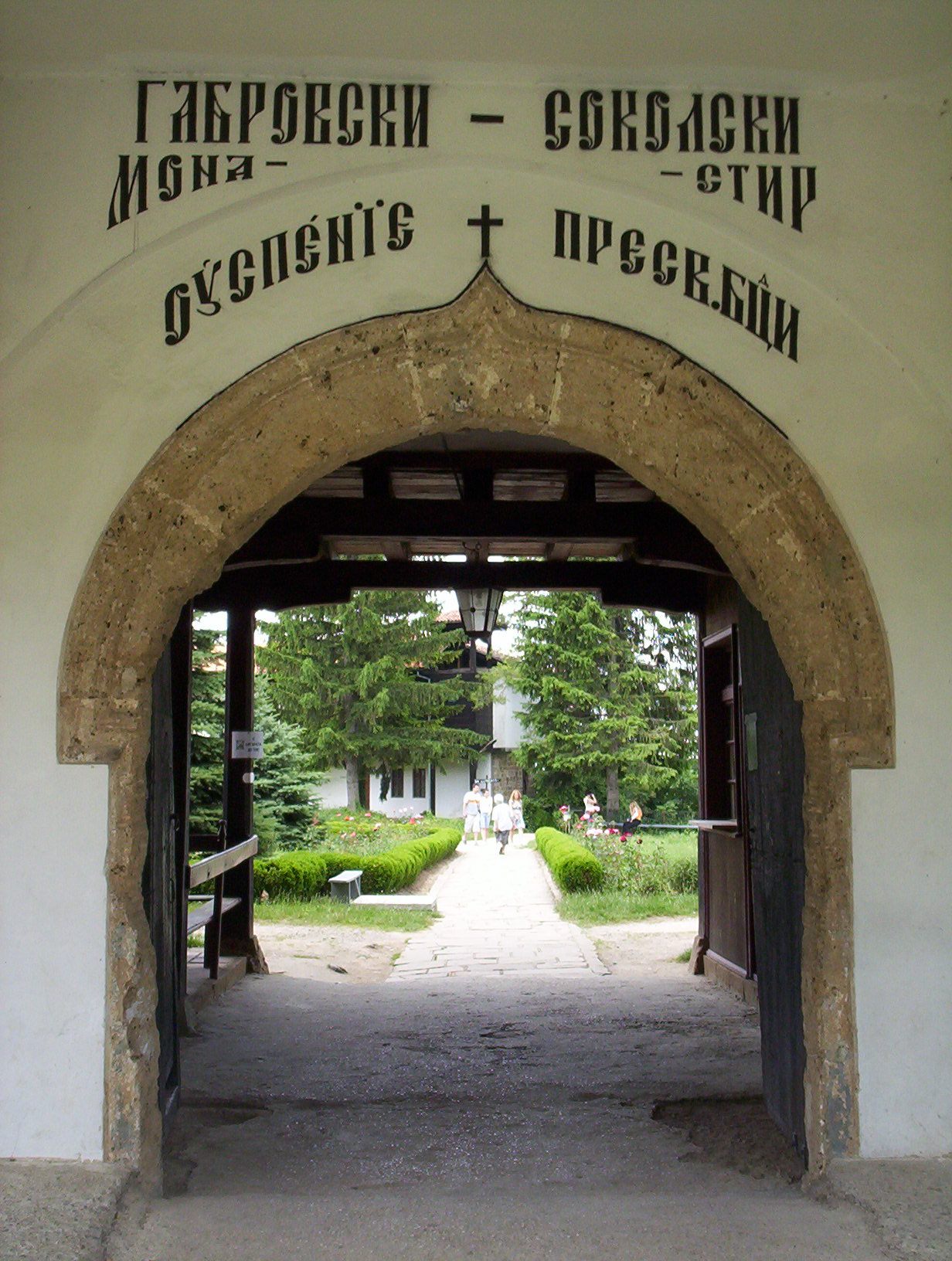

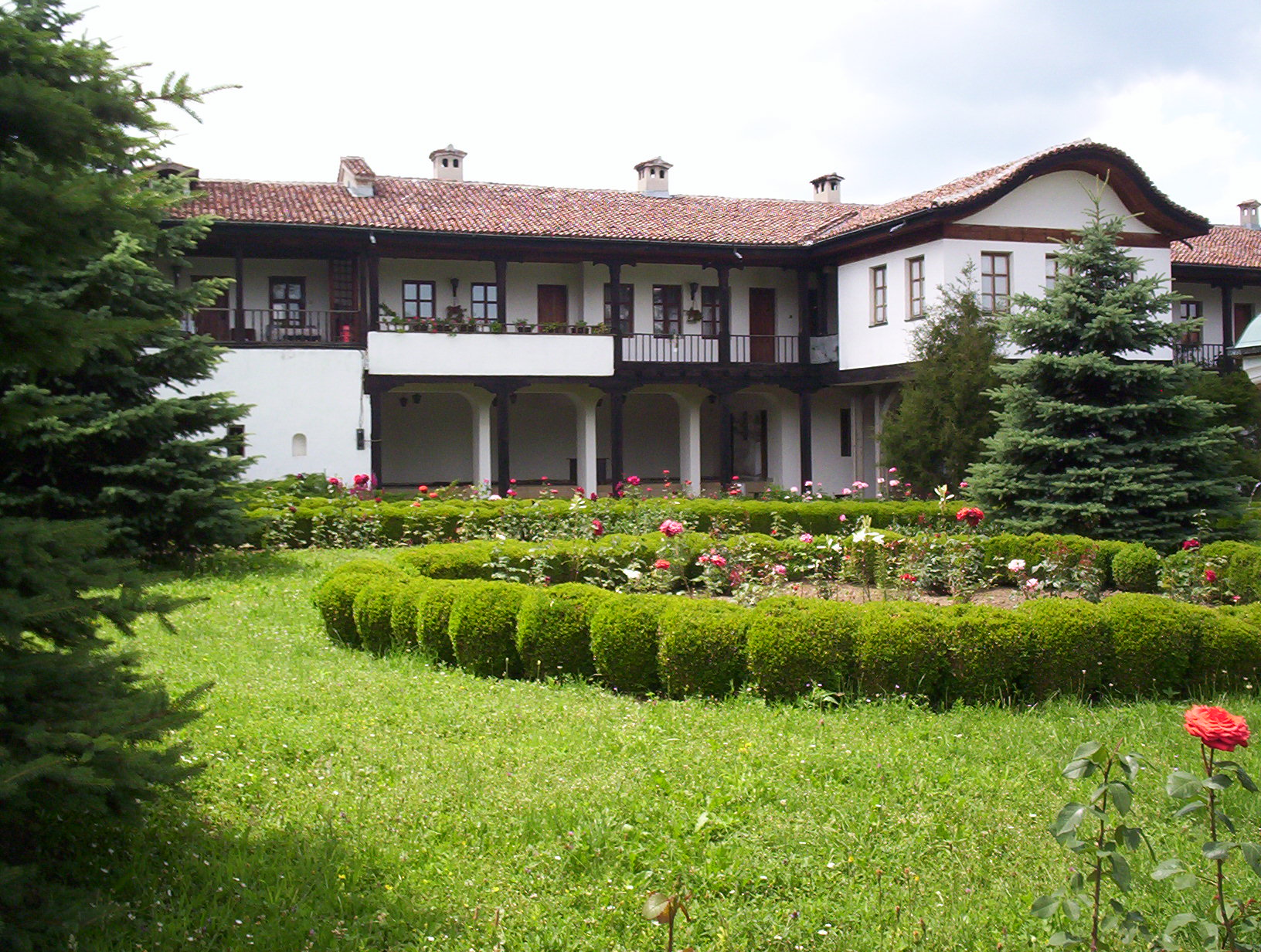

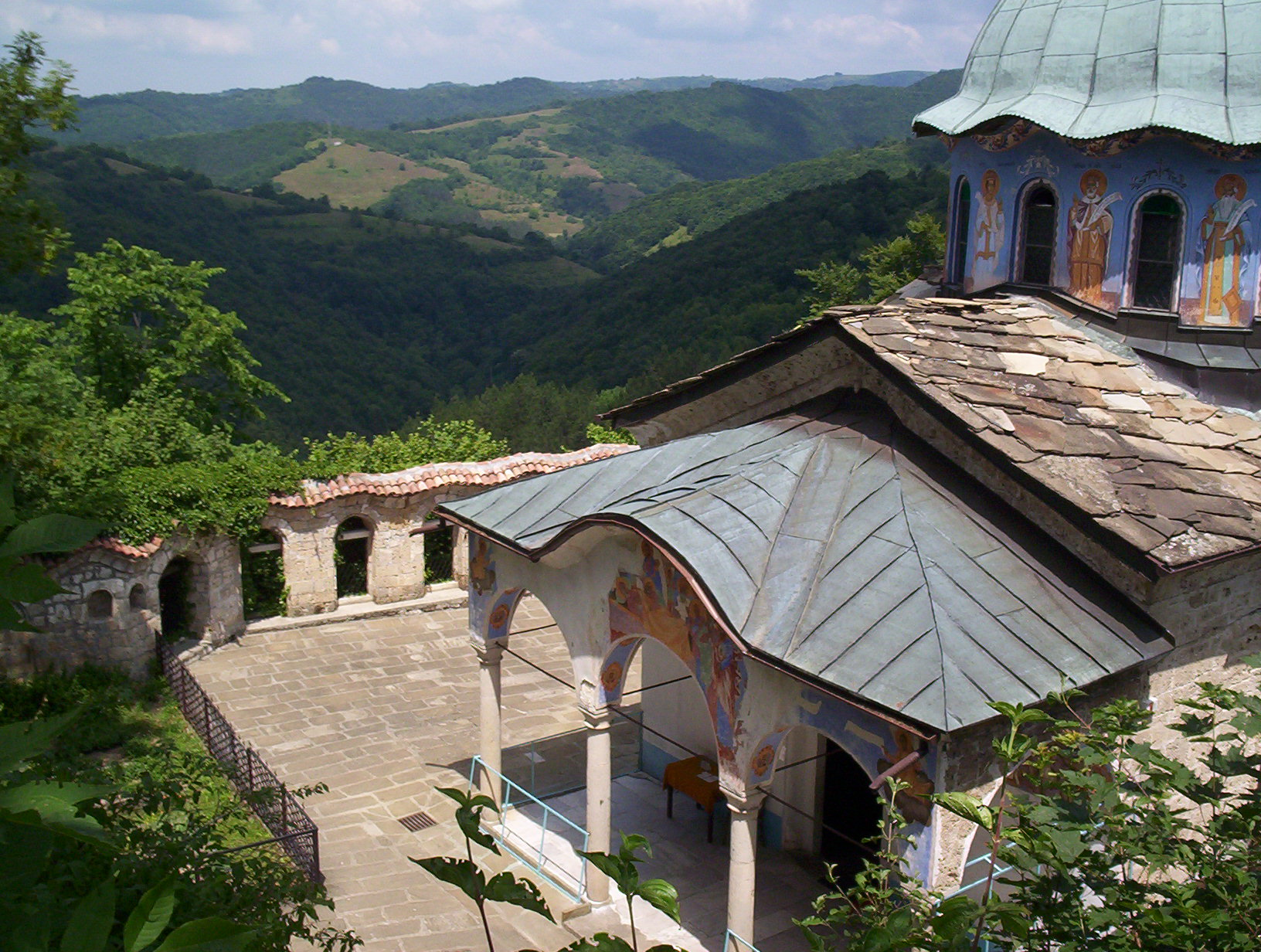

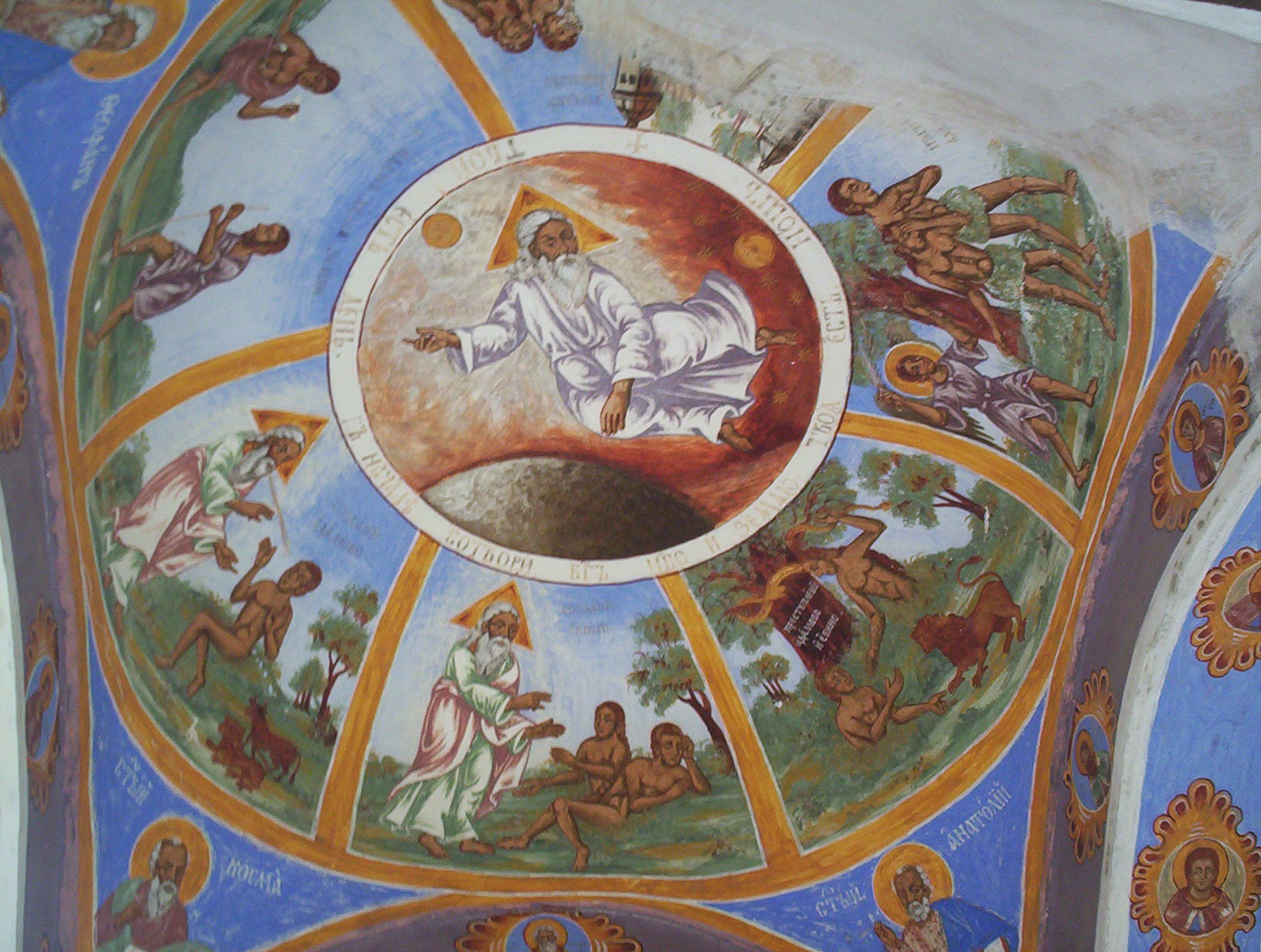

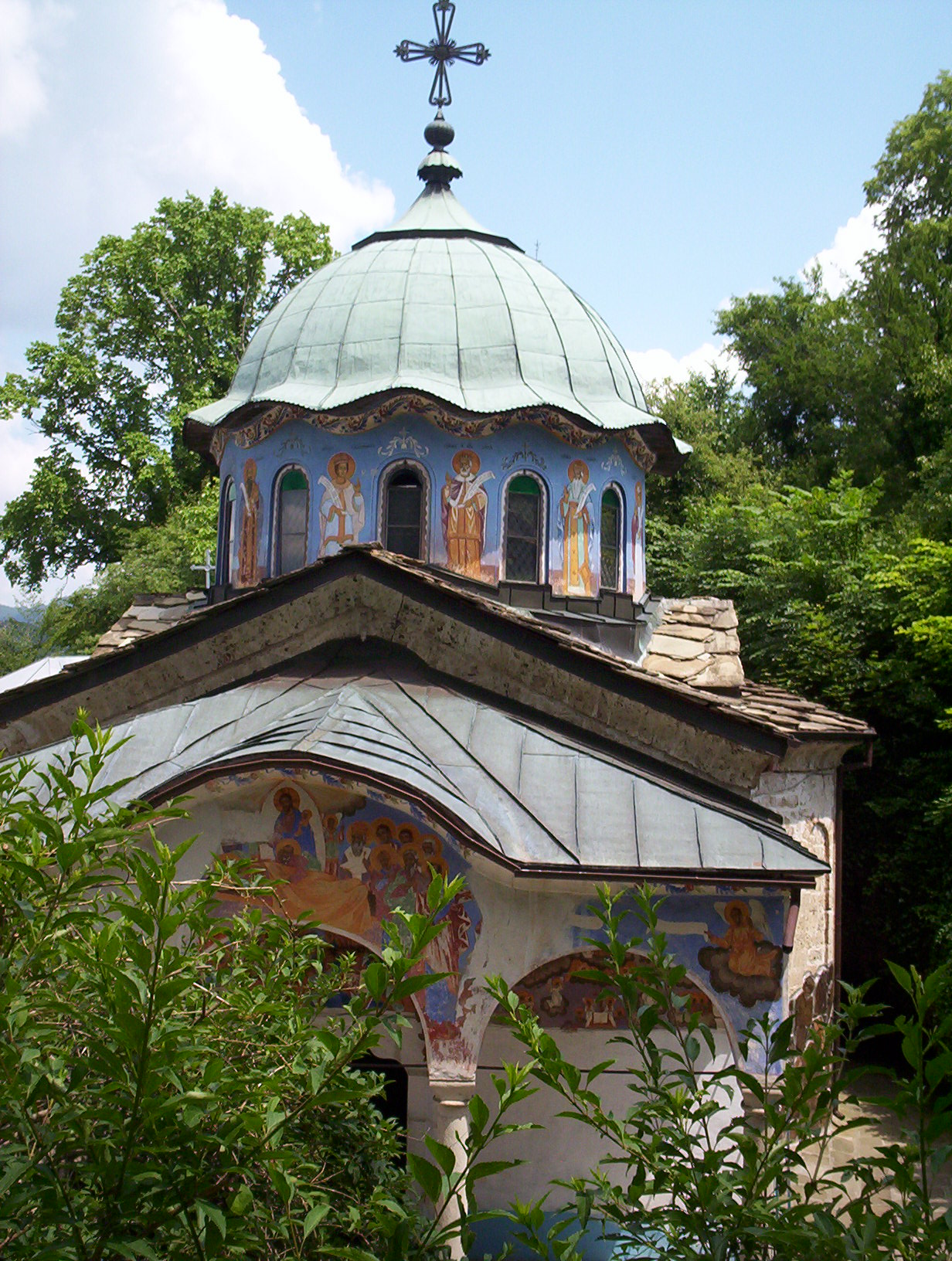

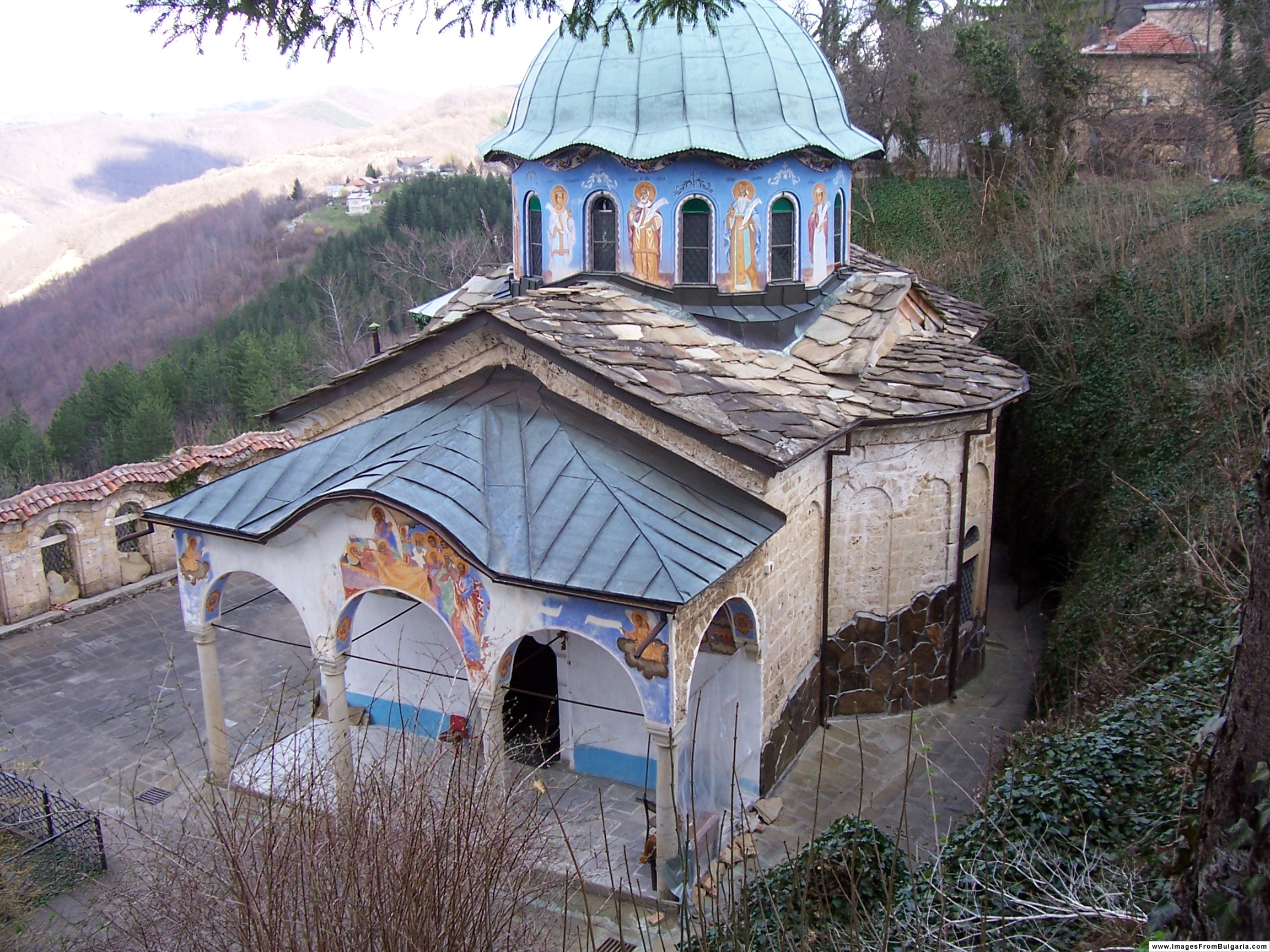

== See also ==
- Battles of the Russo-Turkish War (1877–1878)
- Bulgarian Orthodox Church
- Bulgarka Nature Park
- Epic of the Forgotten by Ivan Vazov
- Etar Architectural-Ethnographic Complex
- Heroes of Shipka
- History of Bulgaria
- Gabrovo City
- Shipka Memorial
- Shipka Pass
