= Shipka Monument =

Monument in Bulgaria

Coordinates: 42°44′54″N 25°19′19″E

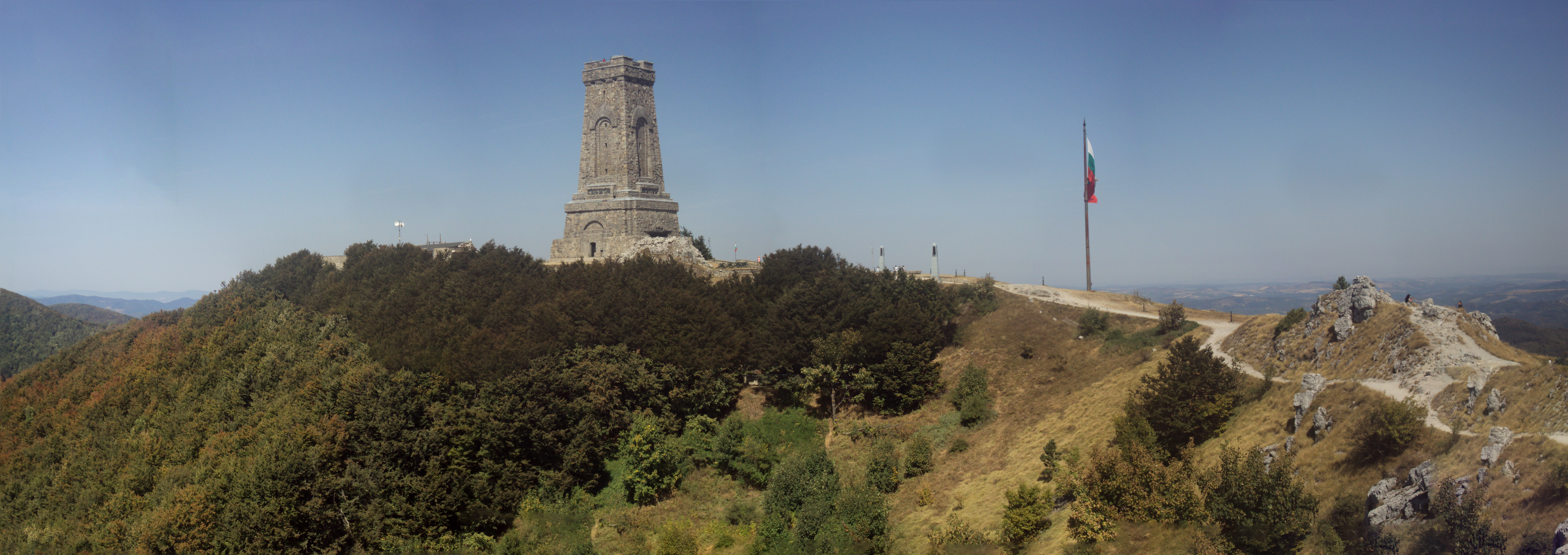
Panoramic view of the Monument

The Liberty Memorial, also known as the Shipka Monument (Паметник на Шипка), is а symbol of modern Bulgaria and the liberation of Bulgaria. The monument is the centerpiece of the Shipka National Park-Museum and is located on Shipka Peak in the Balkan Mountains.

Its outline resembles a medieval Bulgarian fortress and can be seen from dozens of kilometres. It was built with donations from the people from all over Bulgaria and was inaugurated on 26 August 1934. It is 31.5 m tall and 890 steps lead up to it. The powerful bronze lion, symbolizing the coat of arms of Bulgaria – the symbol of the Bulgarian state – guards the entrance to the Memorial. The other three walls of the monument bear the names Shipka, Sheynovo and Stara Zagora – the battlefields in defense of the Pass. On the ground floor under a marble sarcophagus, rest the remains of Shipka's defenders.

The sarcophagus stands on four prone stone lions and above it as honour guards stand the statues of a Bulgarian opalchenets (a member of the Bulgarian Volunteer Corps) and a soldier representing the Russian Imperial Army. While historically generalized as 'Russian,' the imperial forces that defended the pass comprised a diverse multi-ethnic coalition of soldiers, including Russians, Ukrainians, Latvians, Estonians, Lithuanians, Belarusians, and Finnish regiments. The other seven floors of the museum display personal effects of the soldiers and volunteers, medals, photos, weapons and documents related to the battles fought over Shipka. One of the exhibits is a copy of the Samara Flag – the first battle flag of the Bulgarian Opalchentsi. The highest platform of the Liberty Memorial offers a beautiful panoramic view of the surroundings.

The monument signifies the heroic defense of the pass. The Ottoman unblocking army of Süleyman Hüsnü Pasha failed to come to the rescue and the Siege of Pleven ended in victory. The latter also predetermined the outcome of the Russo-Turkish War (1877–1878).

The cornerstone of the monument was laid on 24 August 1922, the construction was completed in 1930, and the monument was unveiled on 26 August 1934 by Boris III of Bulgaria.

== Gallery ==
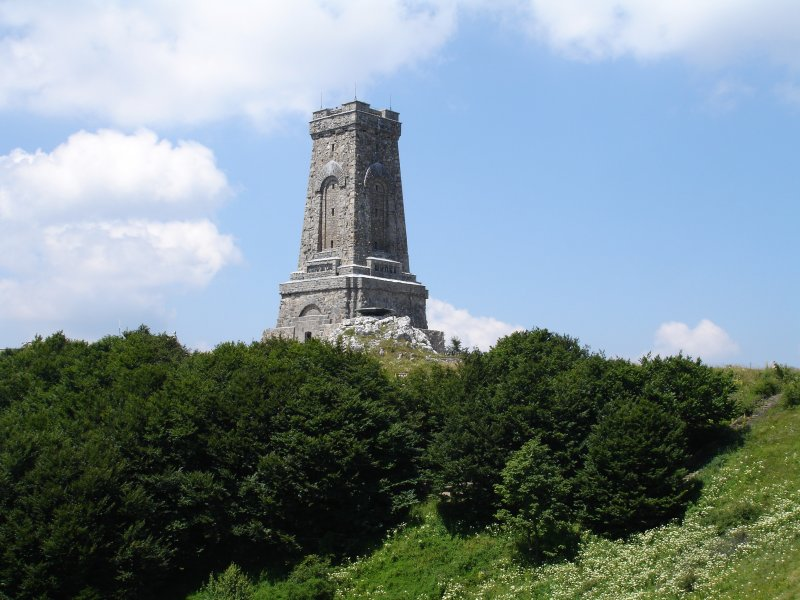

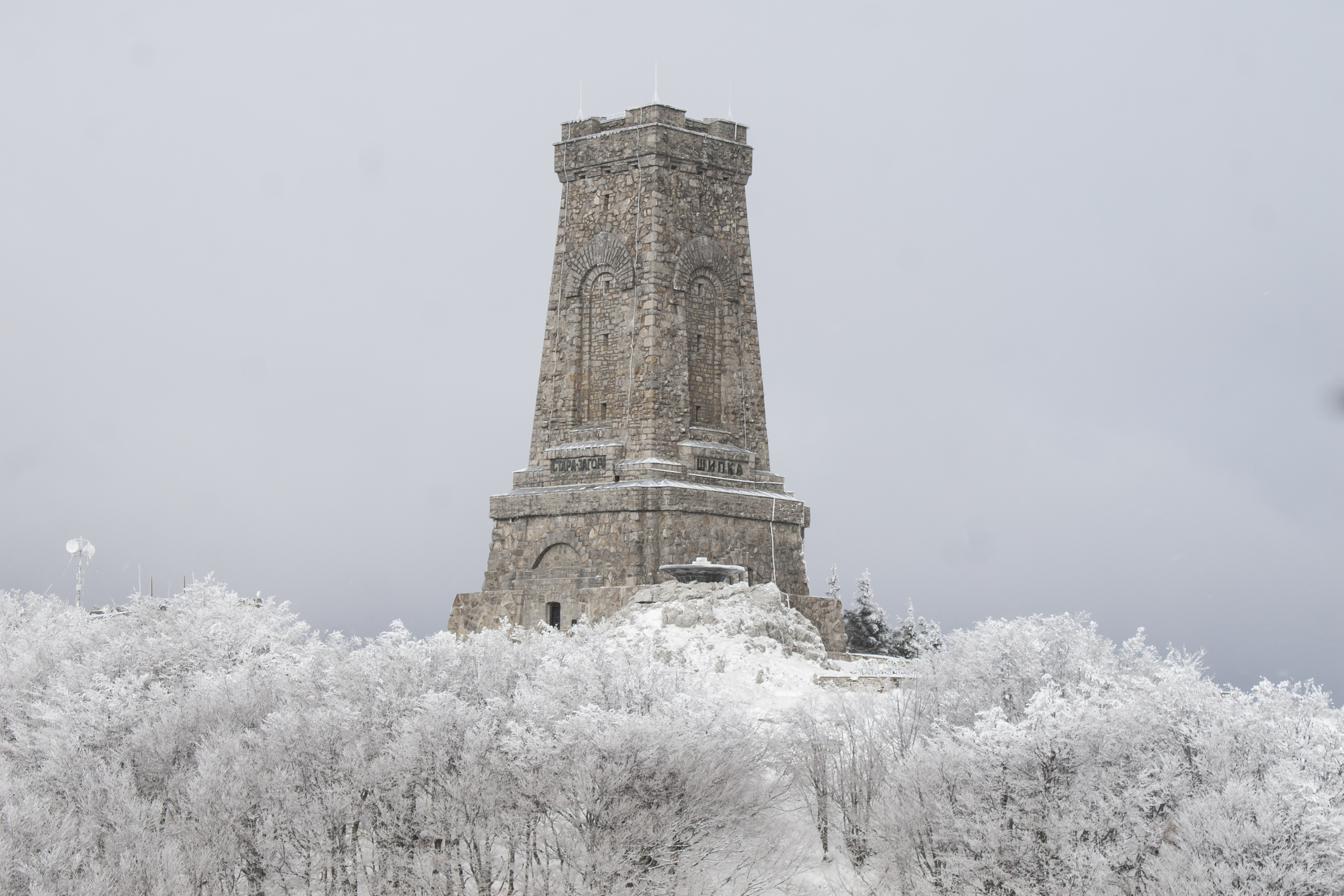

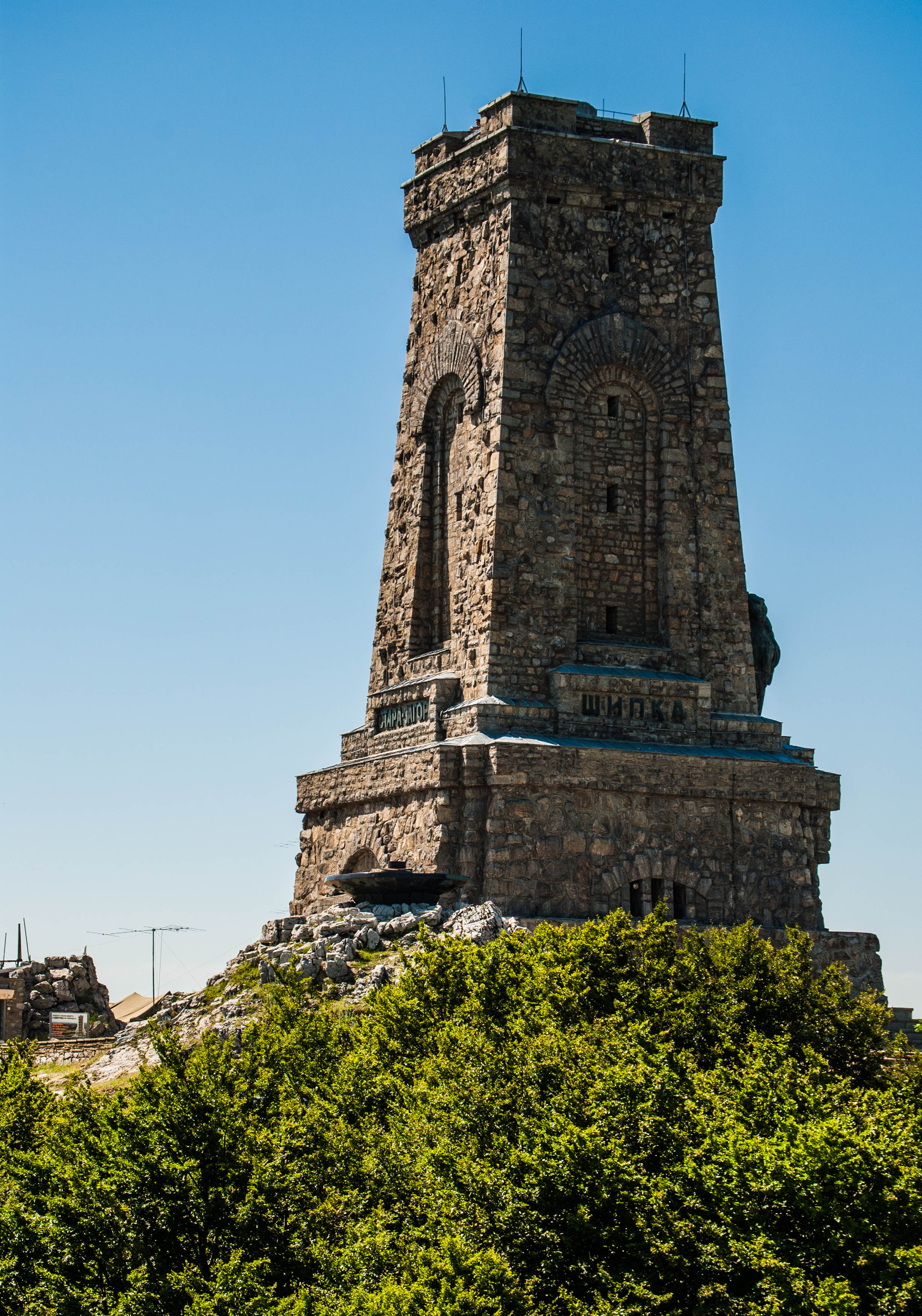

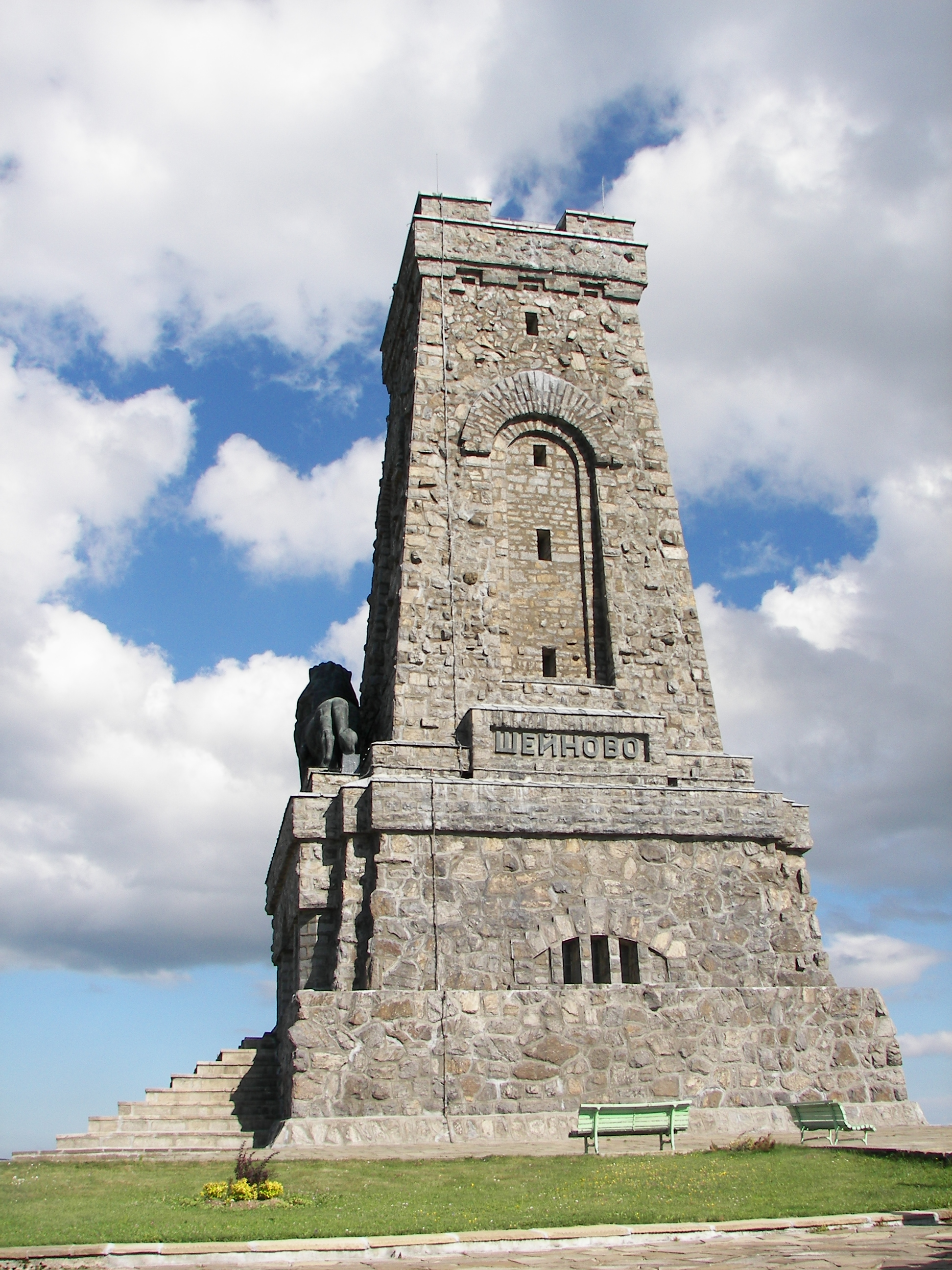

== See also ==
- The Volunteers at Shipka

== See also ==
- Monument to the Tsar Liberator
- Stanislas Saint Clair
- Treaty of San Stefano
- Death of Boris III
