= Shipka (peak) =

Mountain in Balkan mountains, Bulgaria

- Шипка
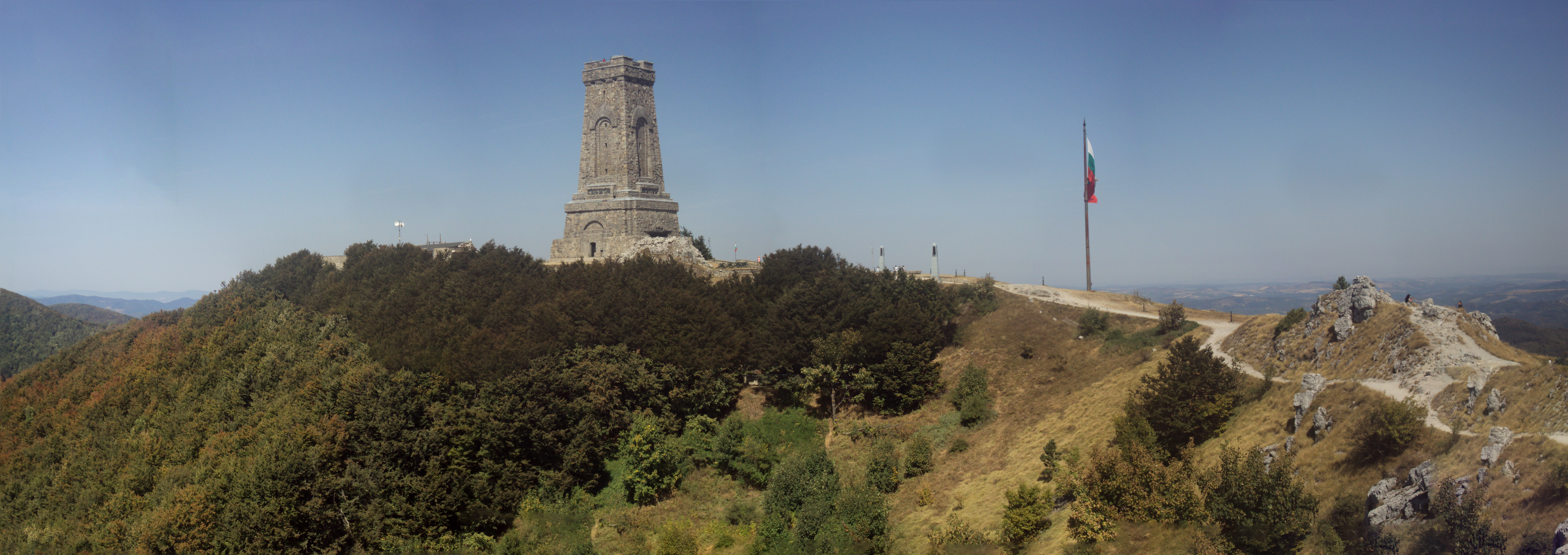

Highest point
- Elevation: 1,329 m (4,360 ft)
- Coordinates: 42°44′53″N 25°19′16″E

Geography
- Location within Bulgaria

Shipka (Bulgarian: Шипка) is peak in the central part of Balkan Mountains, east of Shipka Pass, central Bulgaria. The Shipka Monument is situated on the summit.

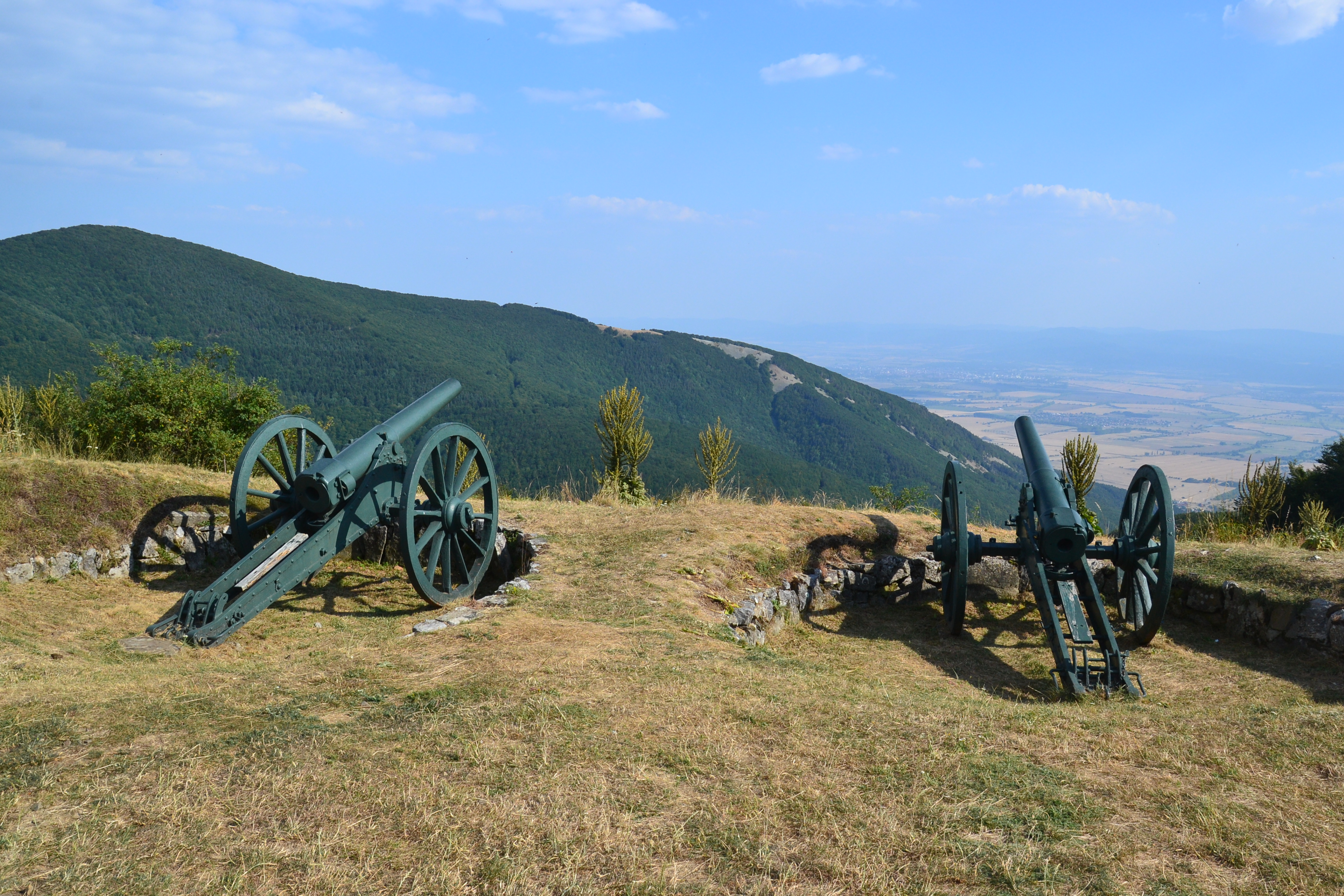

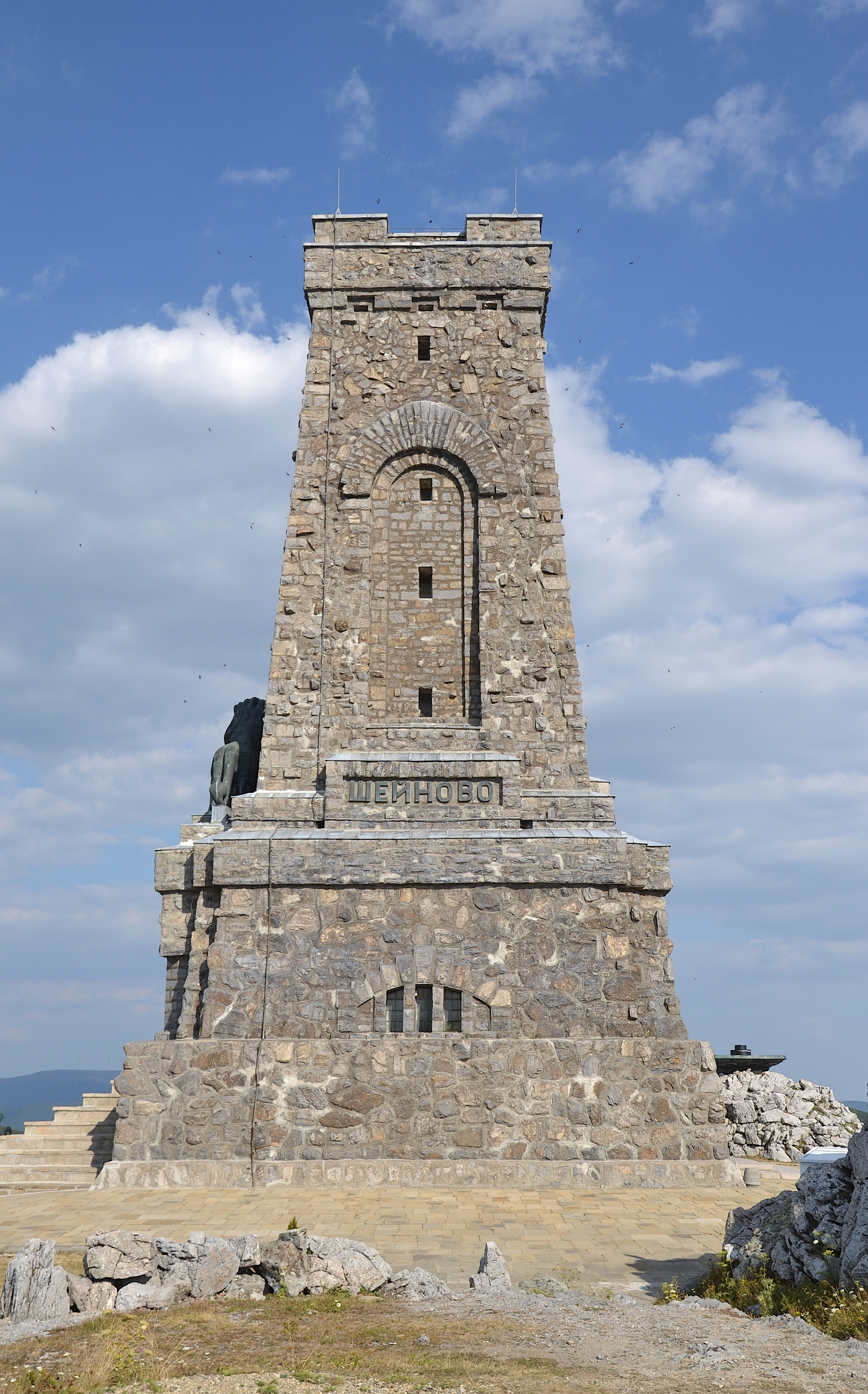
Shipka monument

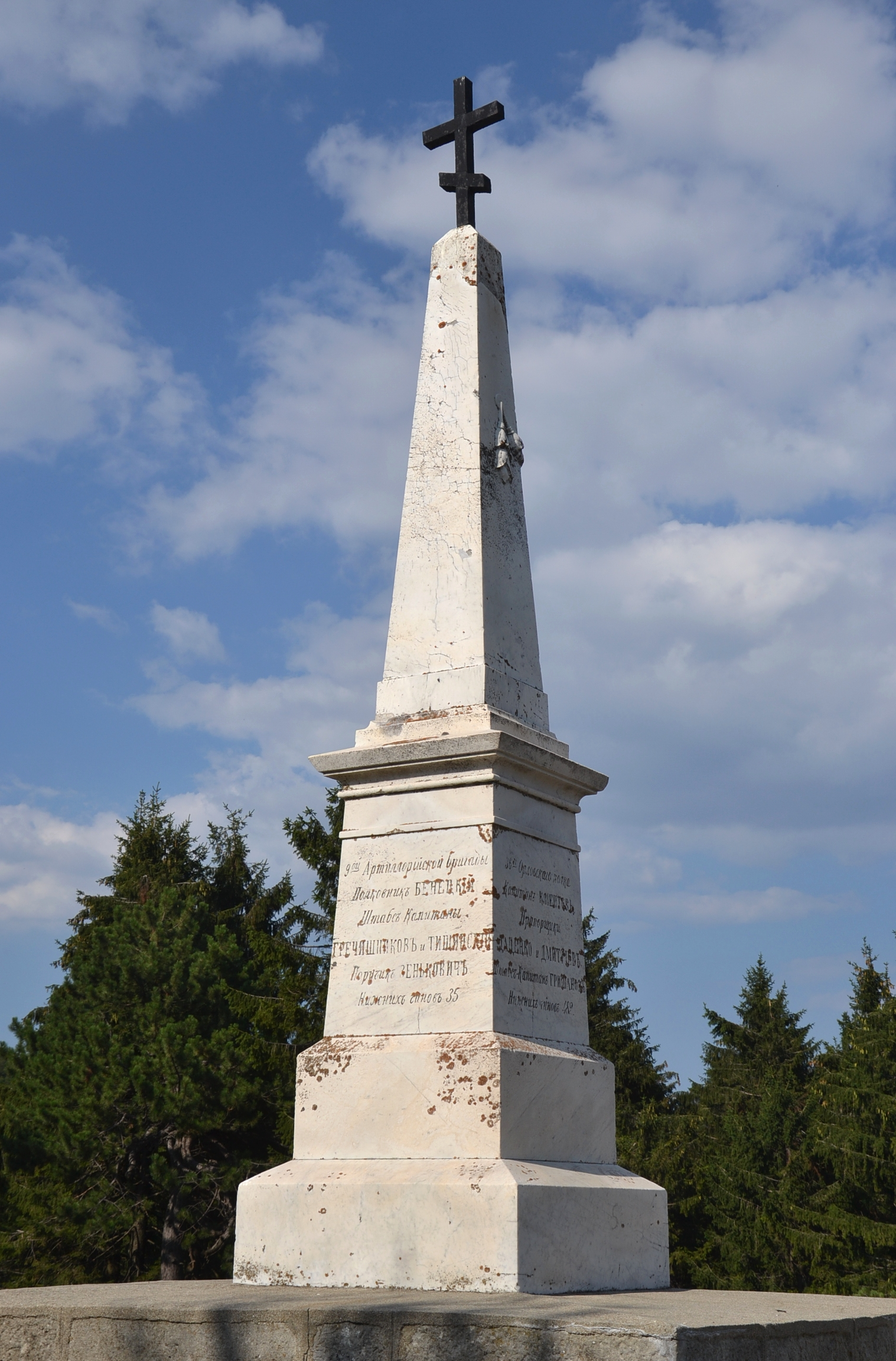

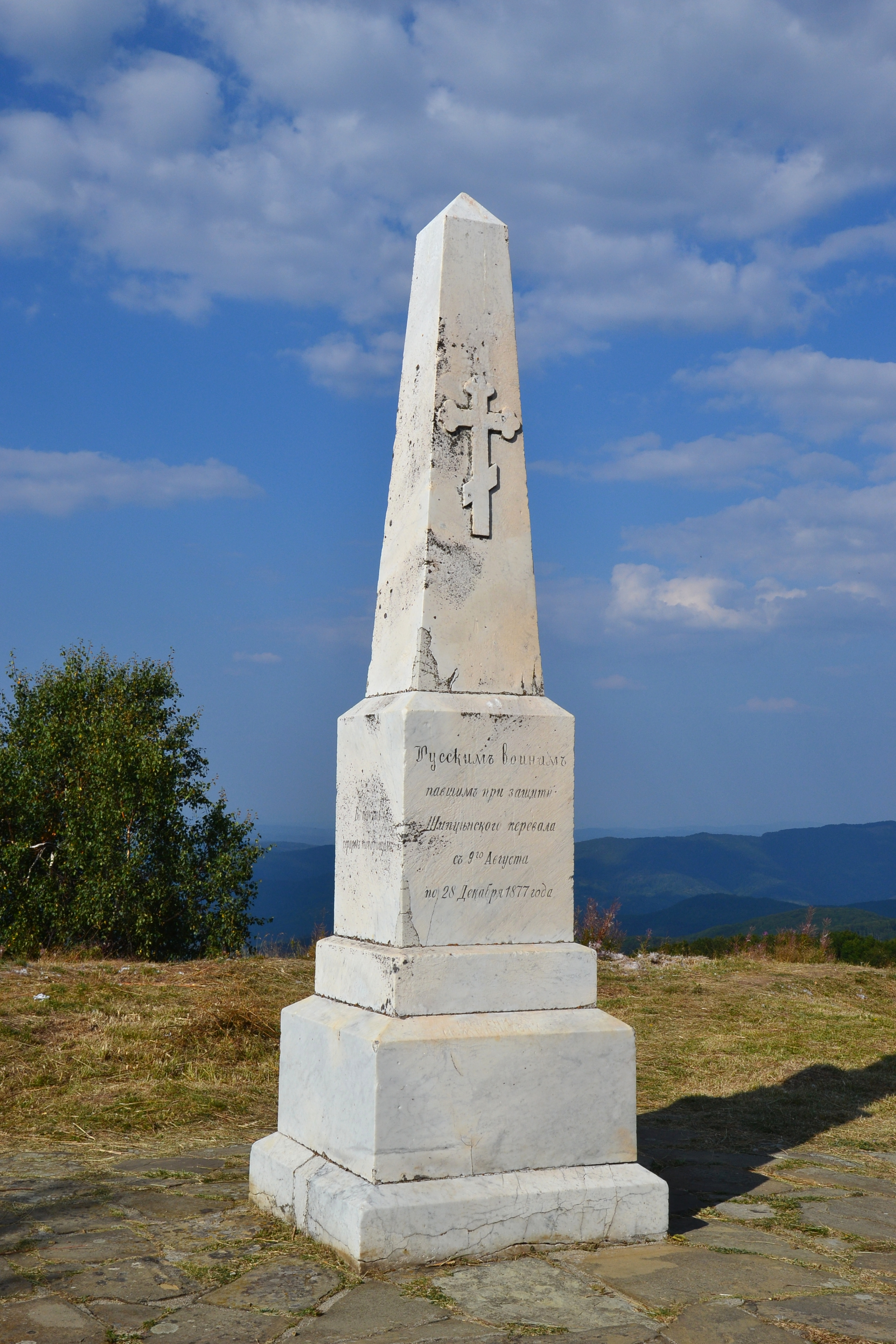

== See also ==
- Battle of Shipka Pass
