= Shipka Pass =

Mountain pass in Bulgaria

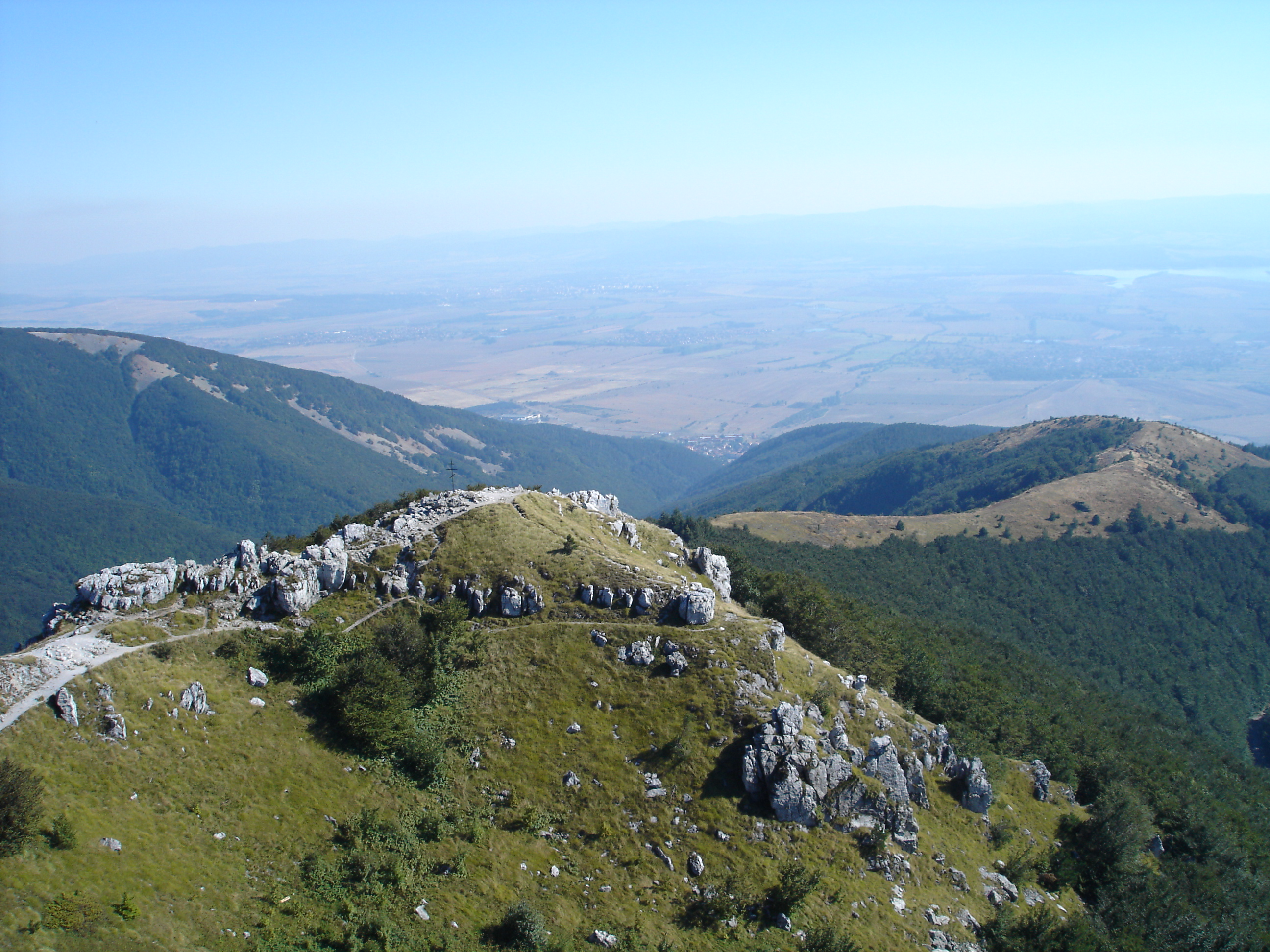
- View from Shipka
- Interactive map of Shipka Pass
- Elevation: 1,190 metres (3,900 ft)
- Traversed by: I-5 / E85

Third Approach
- Location: Bulgaria
- Range: Balkan Mountains
- Coordinates: 42°45′18″N 25°19′8″E

Shipka Pass (Bulgarian: Шипченски проход, Shipchenski prohod) (el. 1150 m./3820 ft.) is a scenic mountain pass through the Balkan Mountains in Bulgaria. It marks the border between Stara Zagora province and Gabrovo province. The pass connects the towns of Gabrovo and Kazanlak. The pass is part of the Bulgarka Nature Park.

The pass is 13 km by road north of the small town of Shipka. It is crossed by a national road I-5, which runs between the Danube on the Ruse border crossing with Romania in north and the Makaza border crossing with Greece.

A road also leads from the pass to the summit of Buzludzha, 12 km to the east.

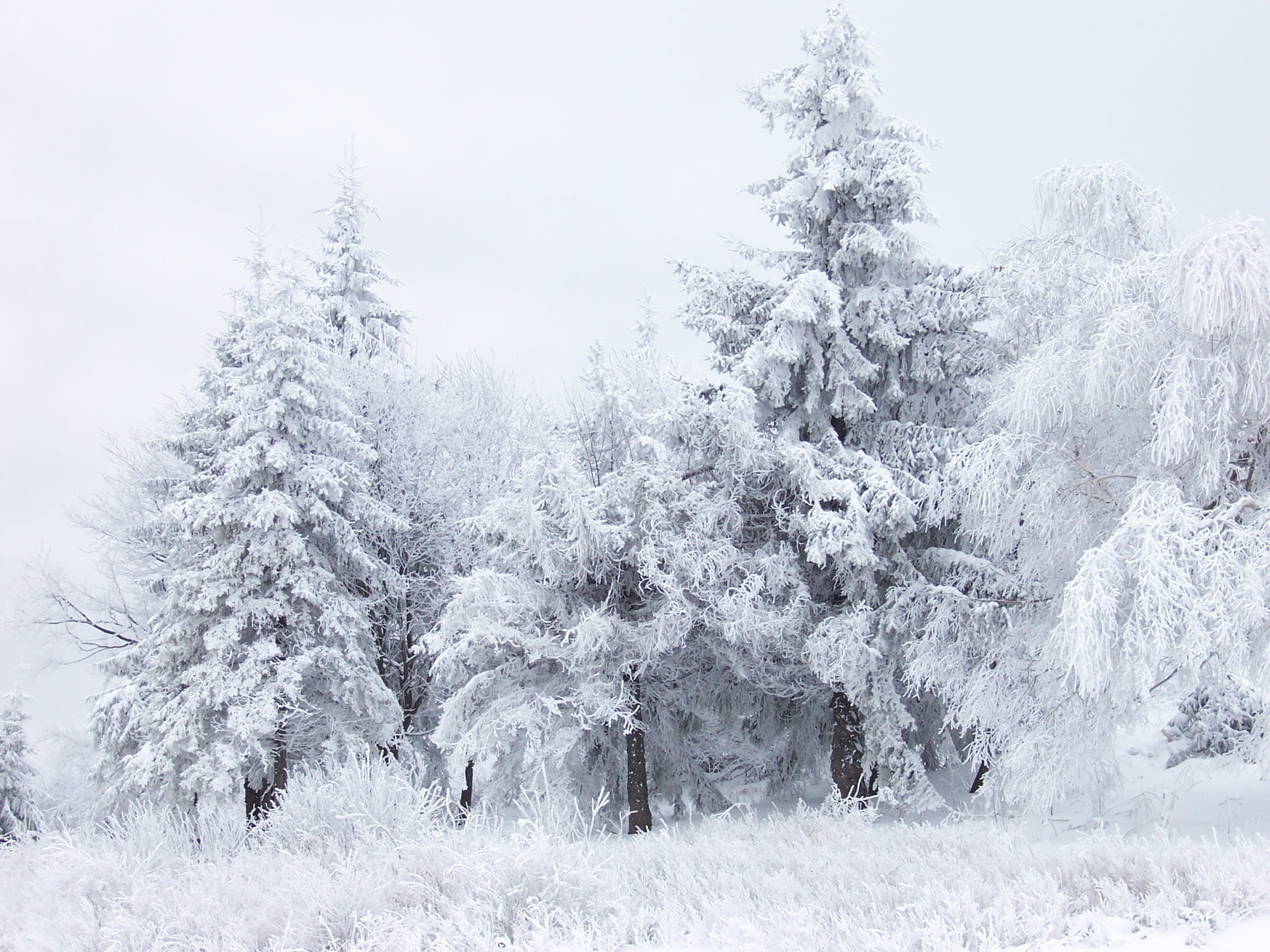
Snow scene at Shipka Pass

== Battle of Shipka Pass ==
During the war in 1877 and 1878, Shipka Pass was the scene of a series of conflicts collectively named the Battle of Shipka Pass, fought between Russian troops together with Bulgarian volunteers against the Ottoman Empire.

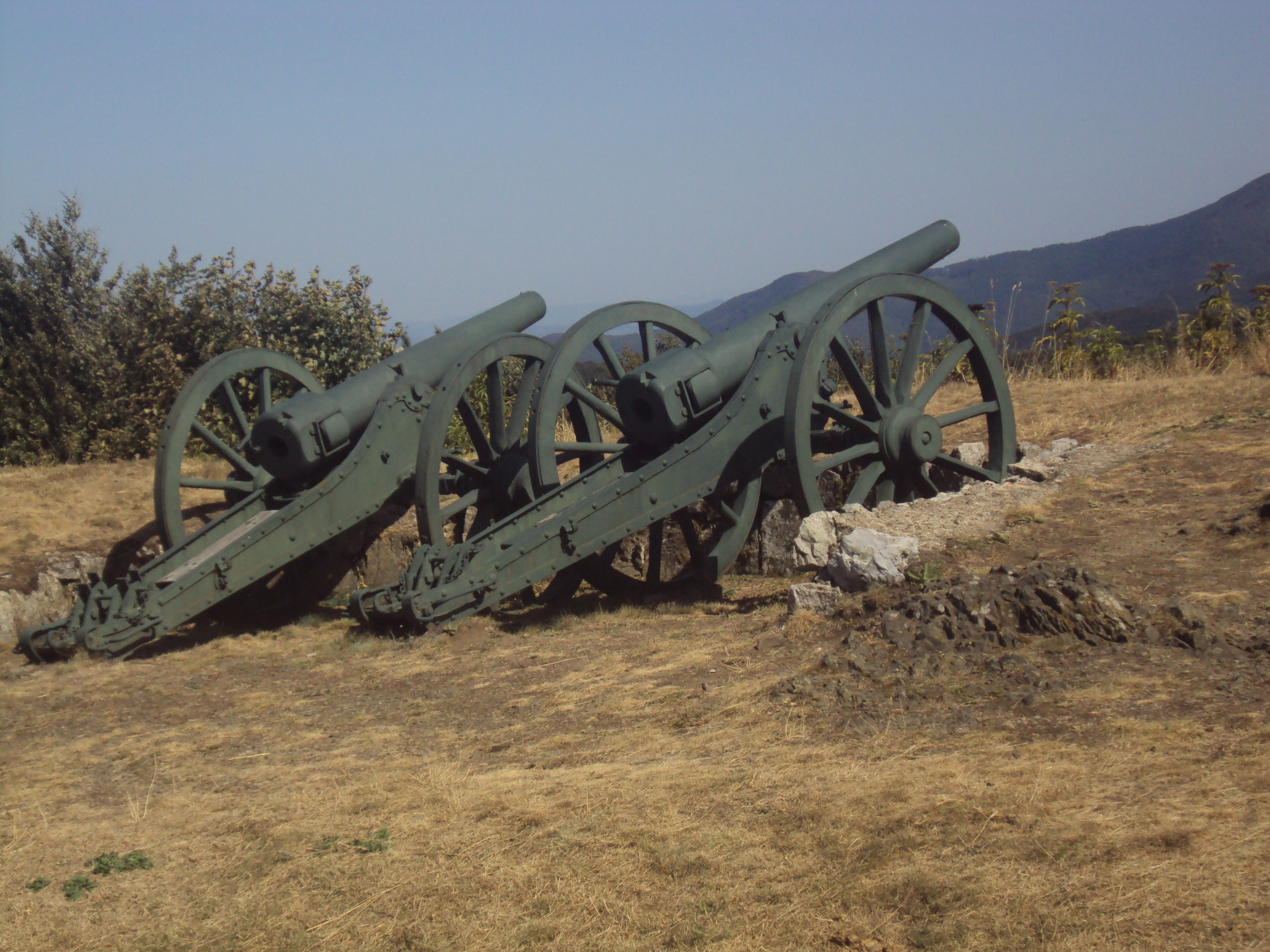
Cannons on Shipka pass

== Shipka Monument ==
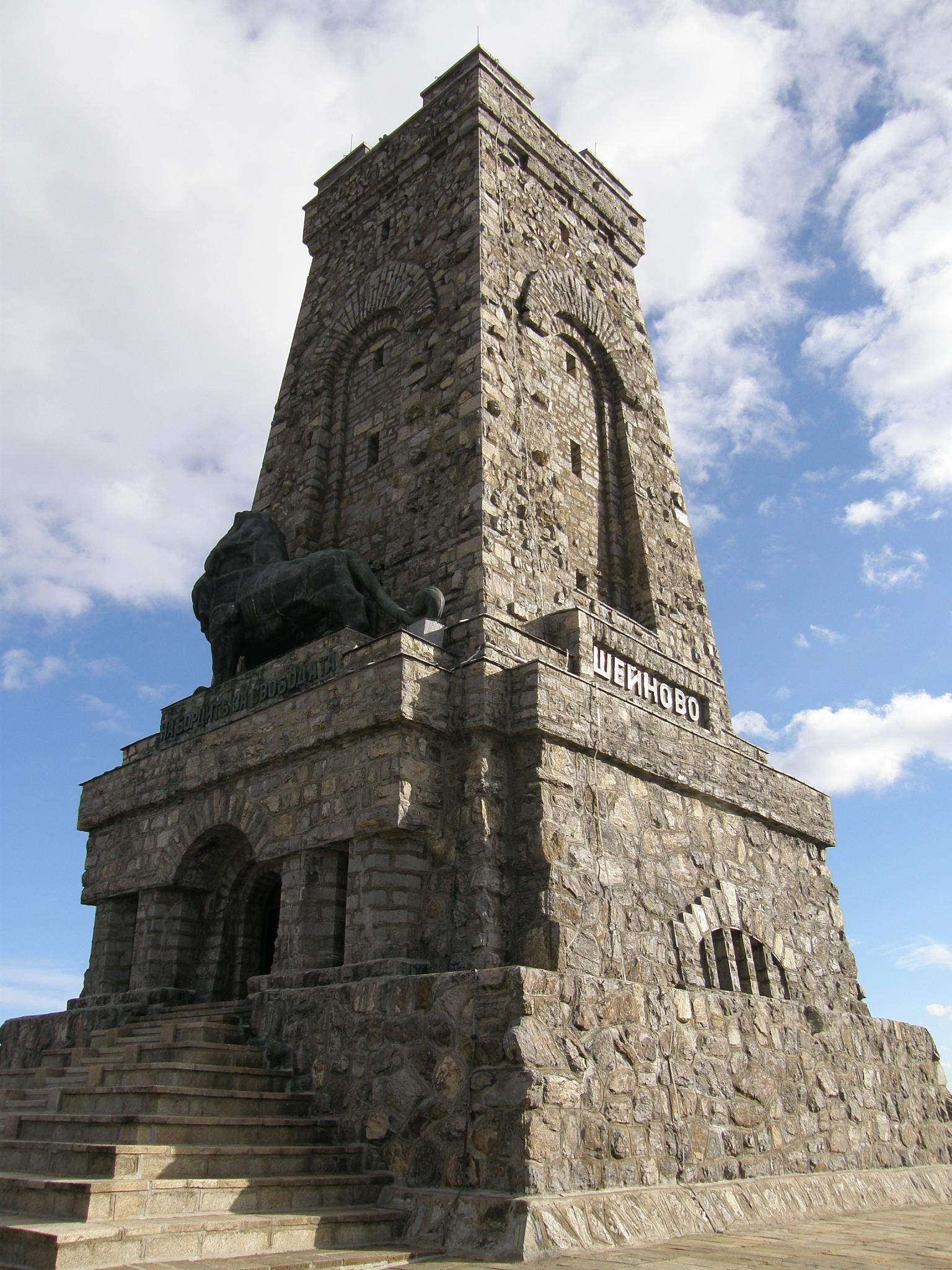
A close view of the Shipka Memorial

It was opened with a ceremony in 1934 and designed by architect Atanas Donkov and sculptor Aleksandar Andreev. An important influence was the Monument to the Battle of the Nations in Germany.

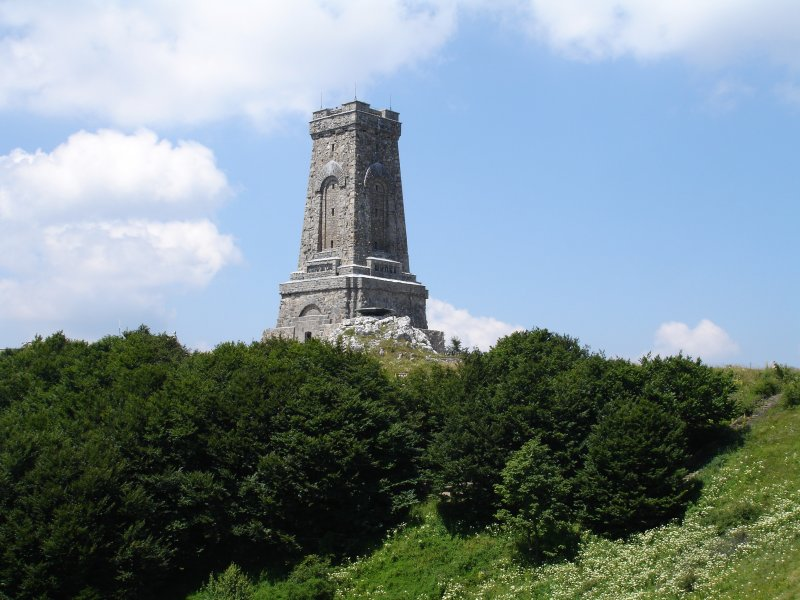
Another view of the memorial

The monument is a 31.5-metre (98-foot) high stone tower in the form of a truncated pyramid. A giant bronze lion, 8 m (26 feet) long and 4 m (13 feet) high, stands above the entrance to the tower, and a figure of a woman represents the victory over the Ottoman forces. A marble sarcophagus housing some of the remains of the Bulgarian casualties is on the first floor. There are four other floors where one can find replicas of Bulgarian and Russian military flags and other relics. The top of the tower reveals a panorama of Shipka Peak and the surrounding area.

== Gallery ==
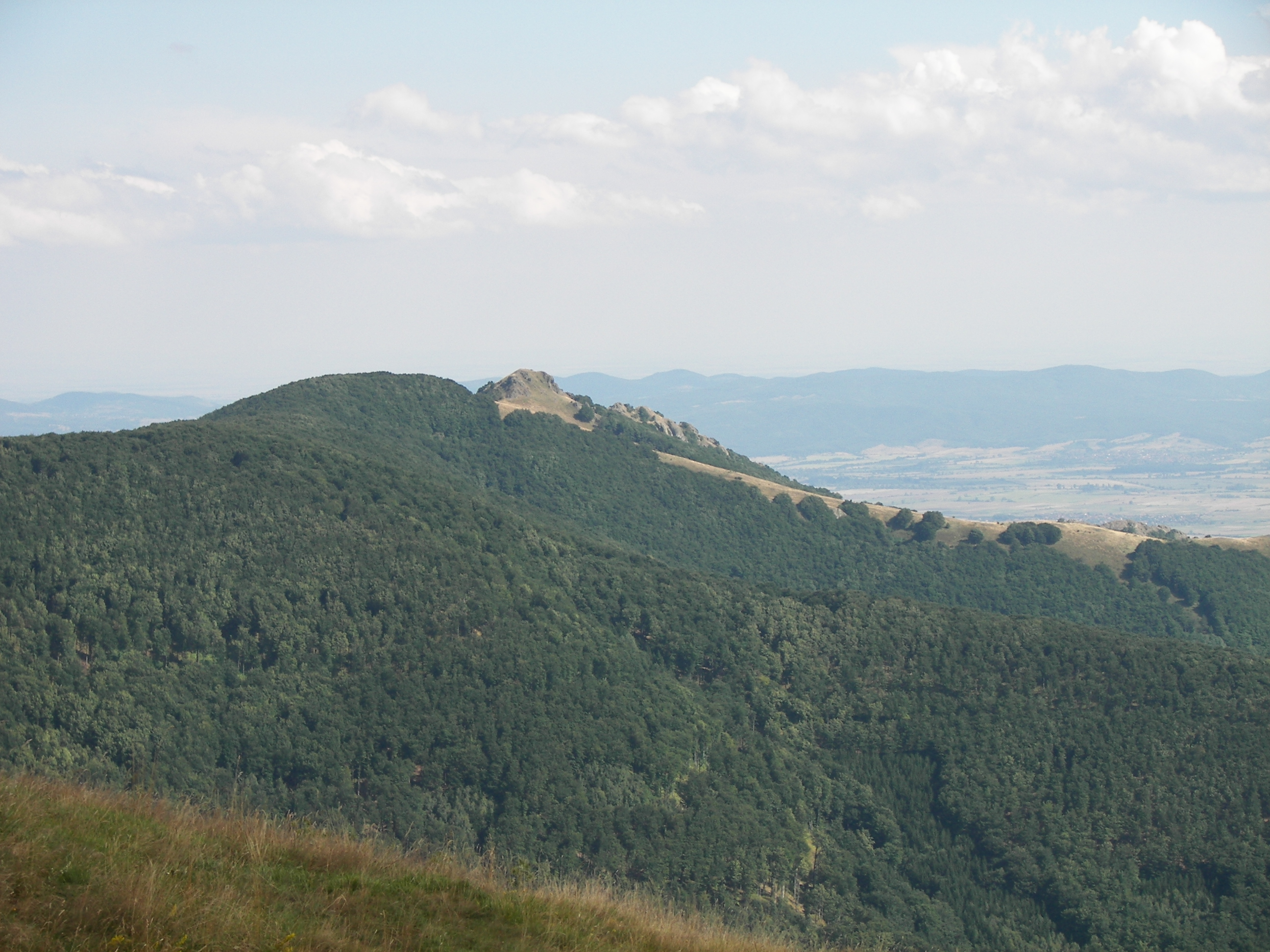

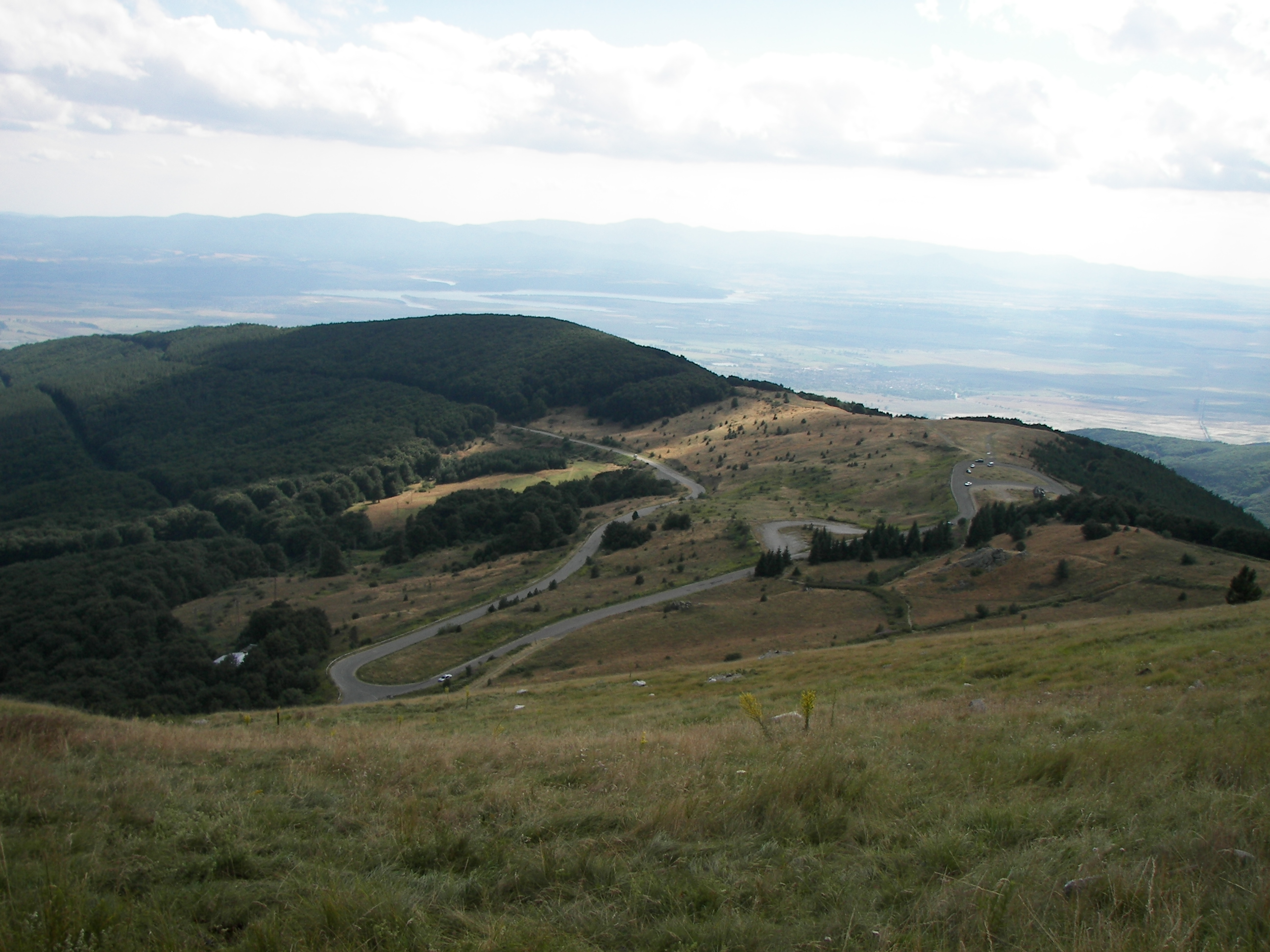

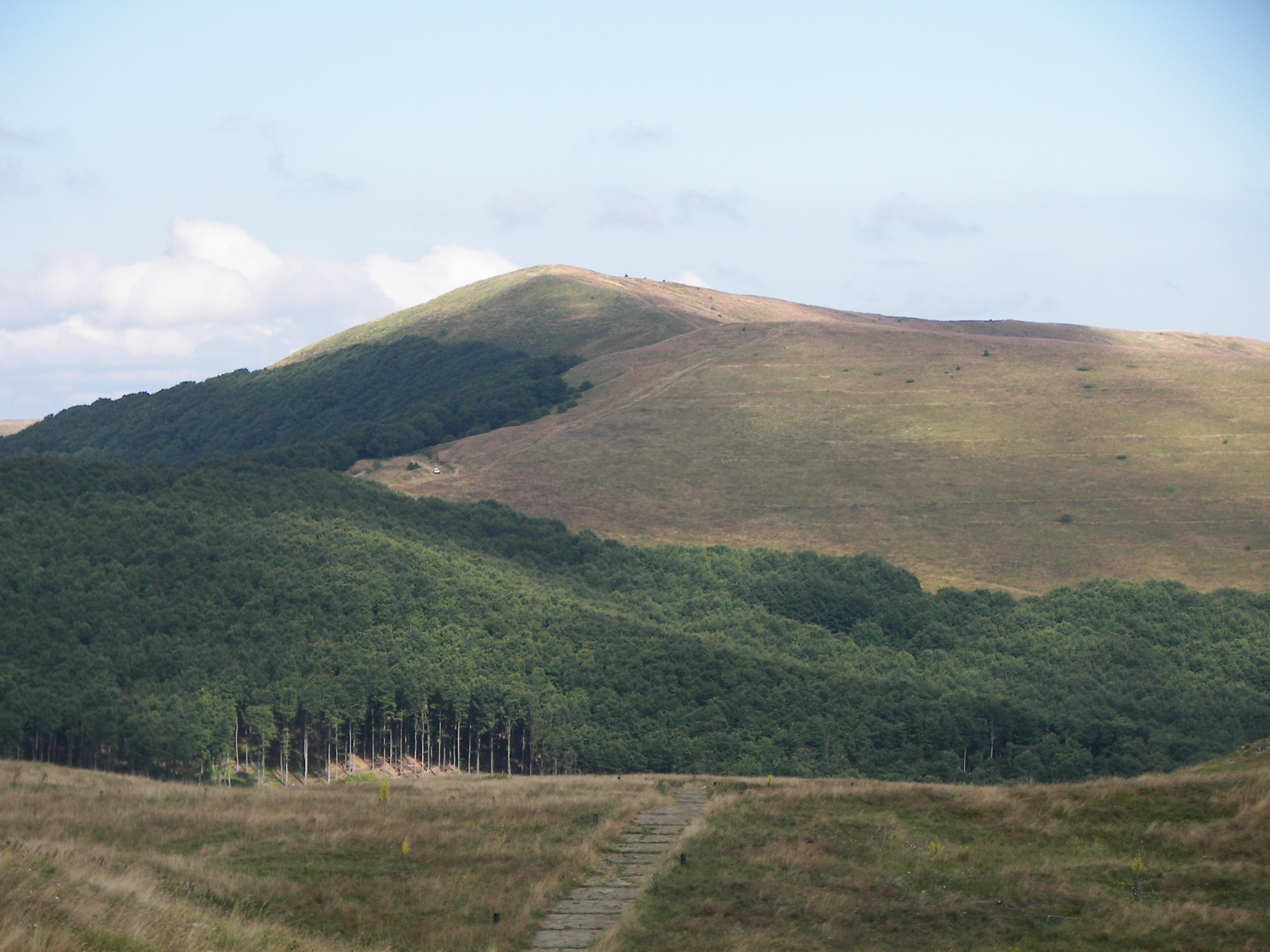

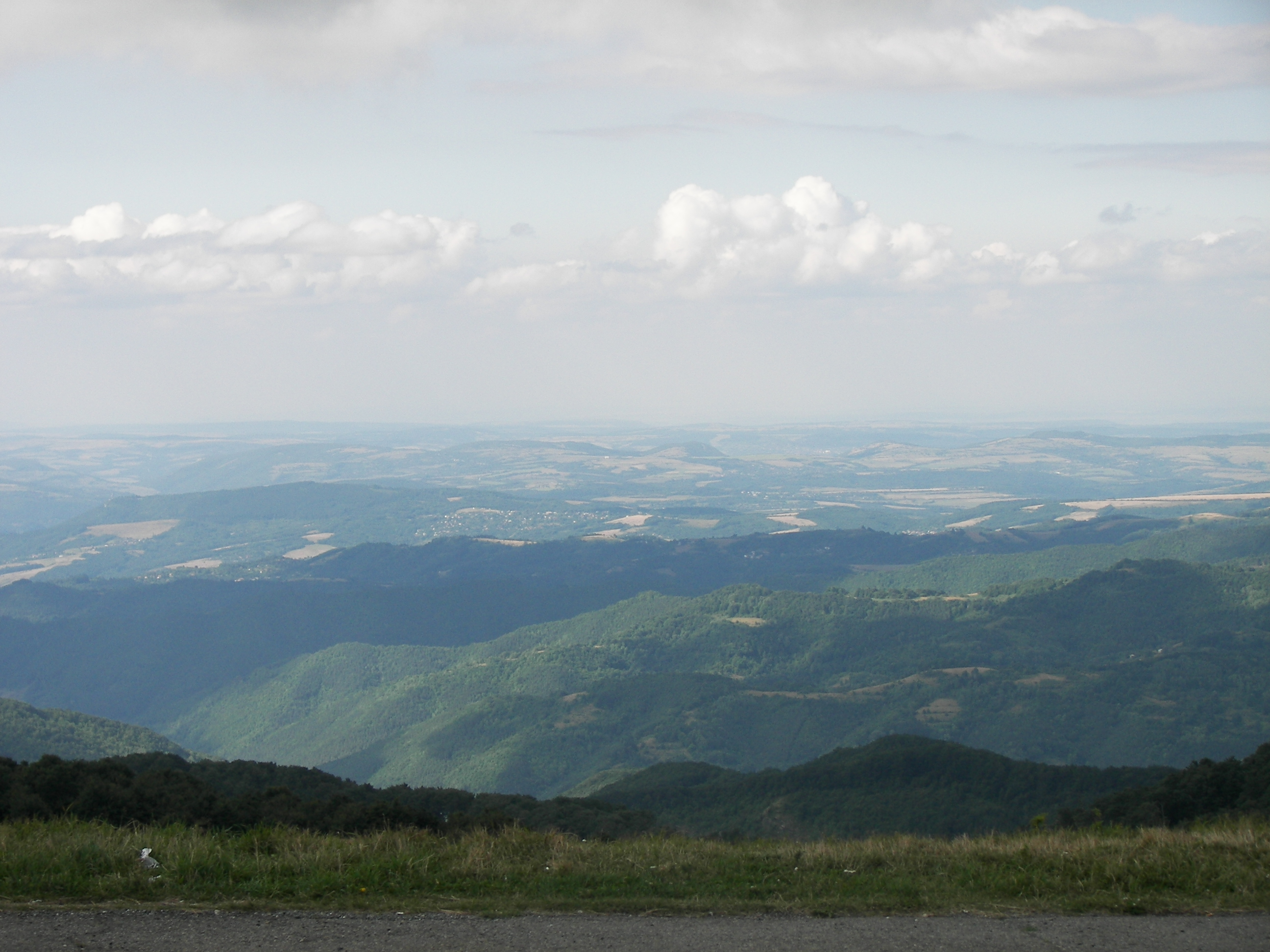

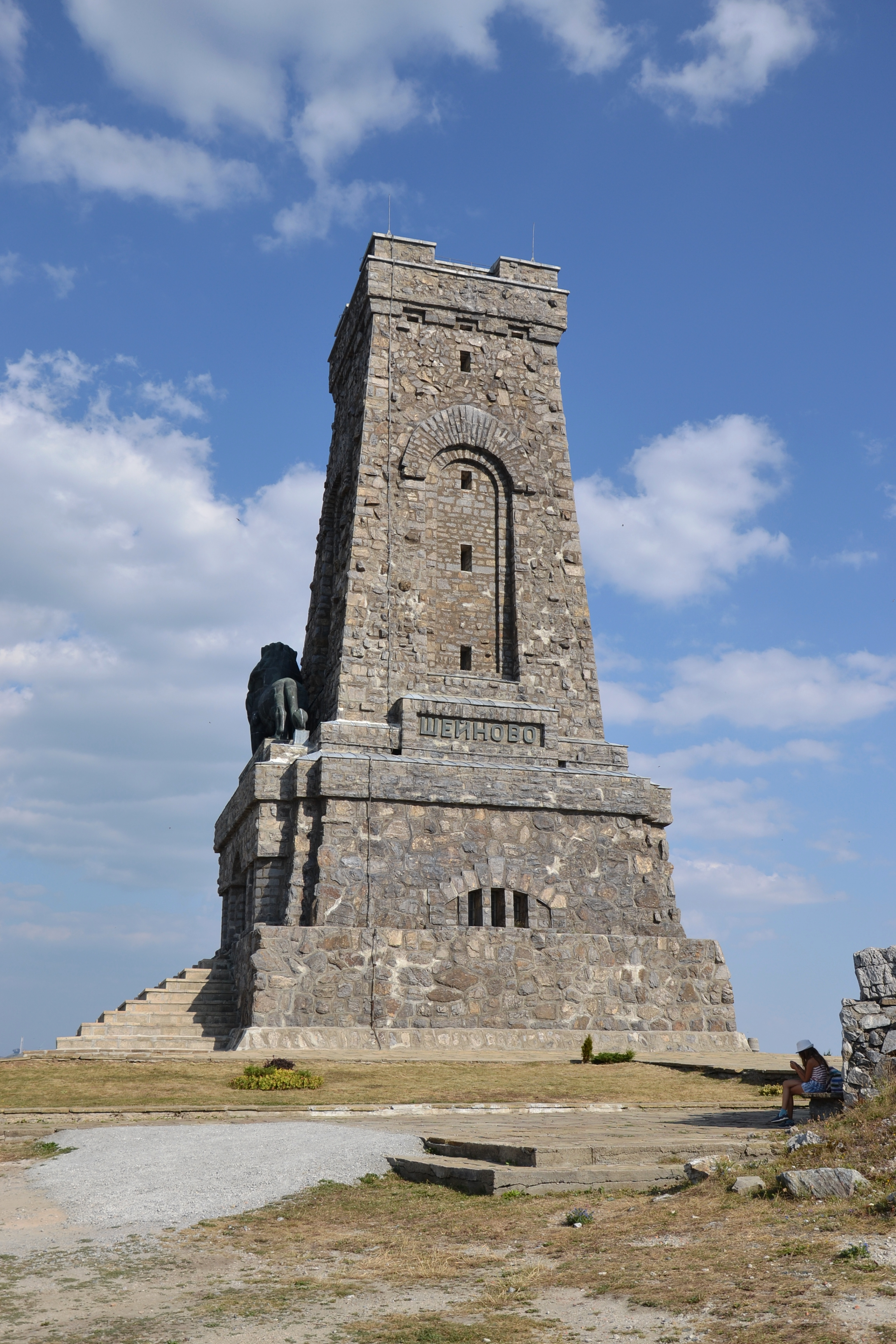

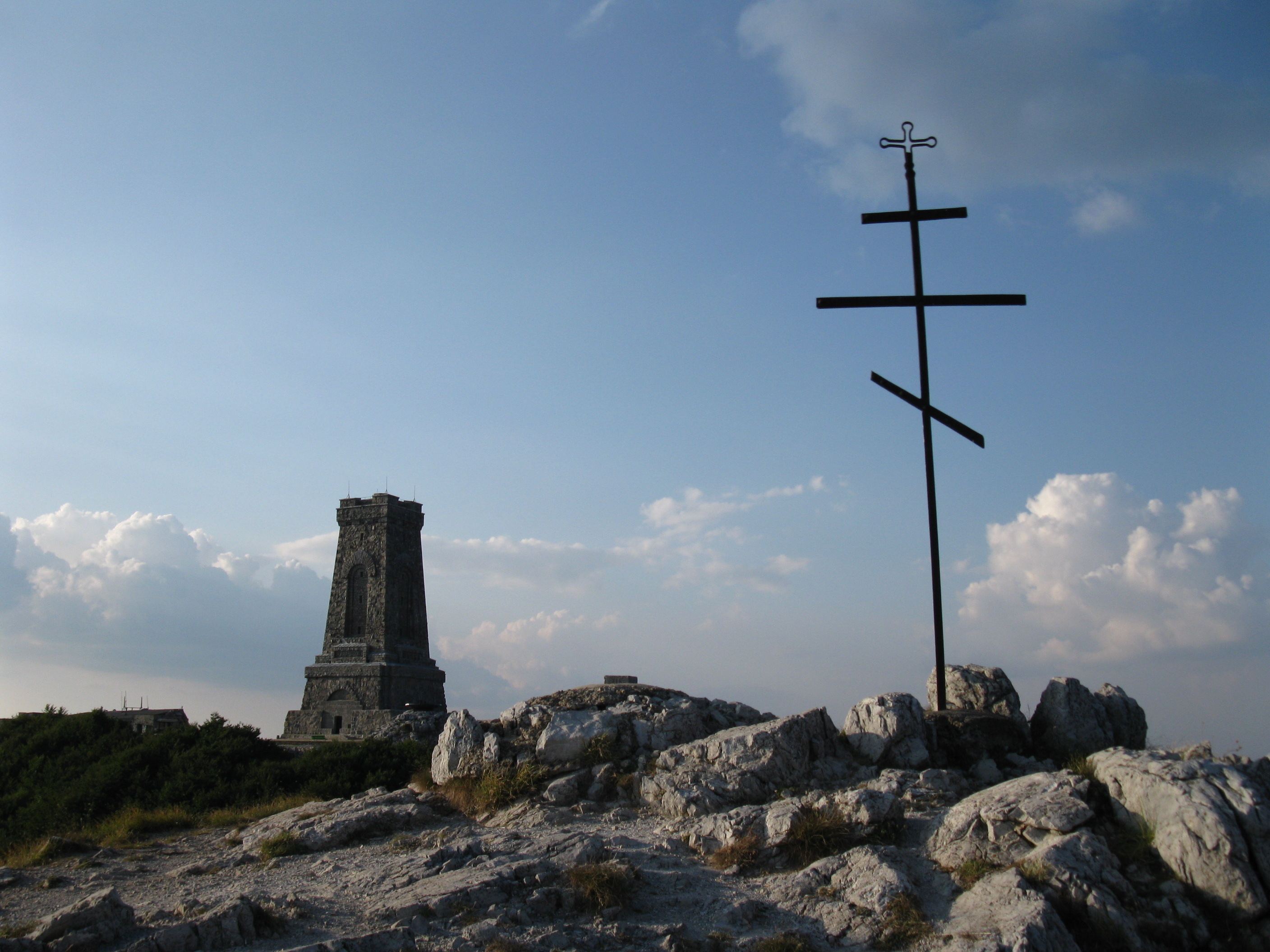

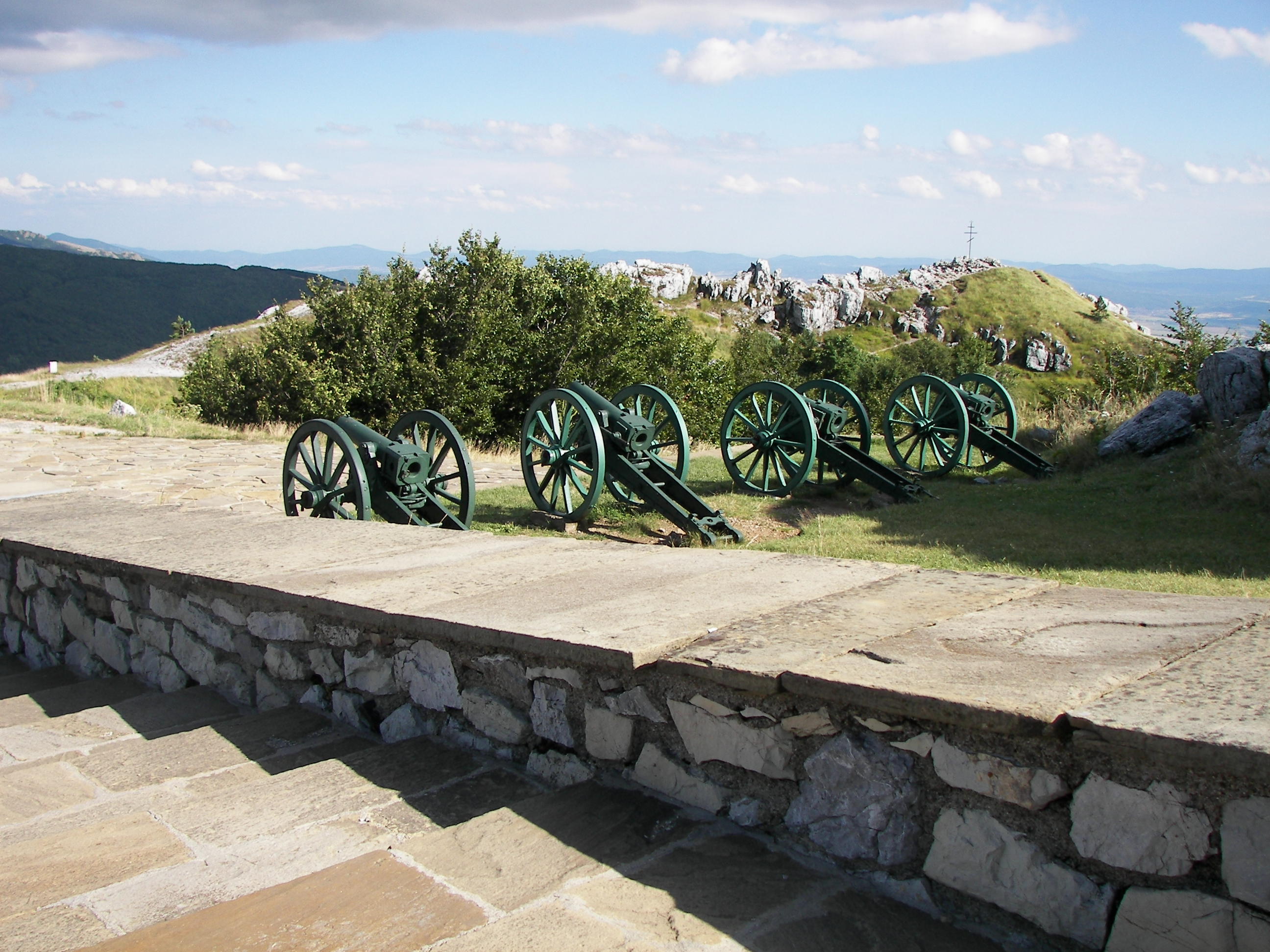

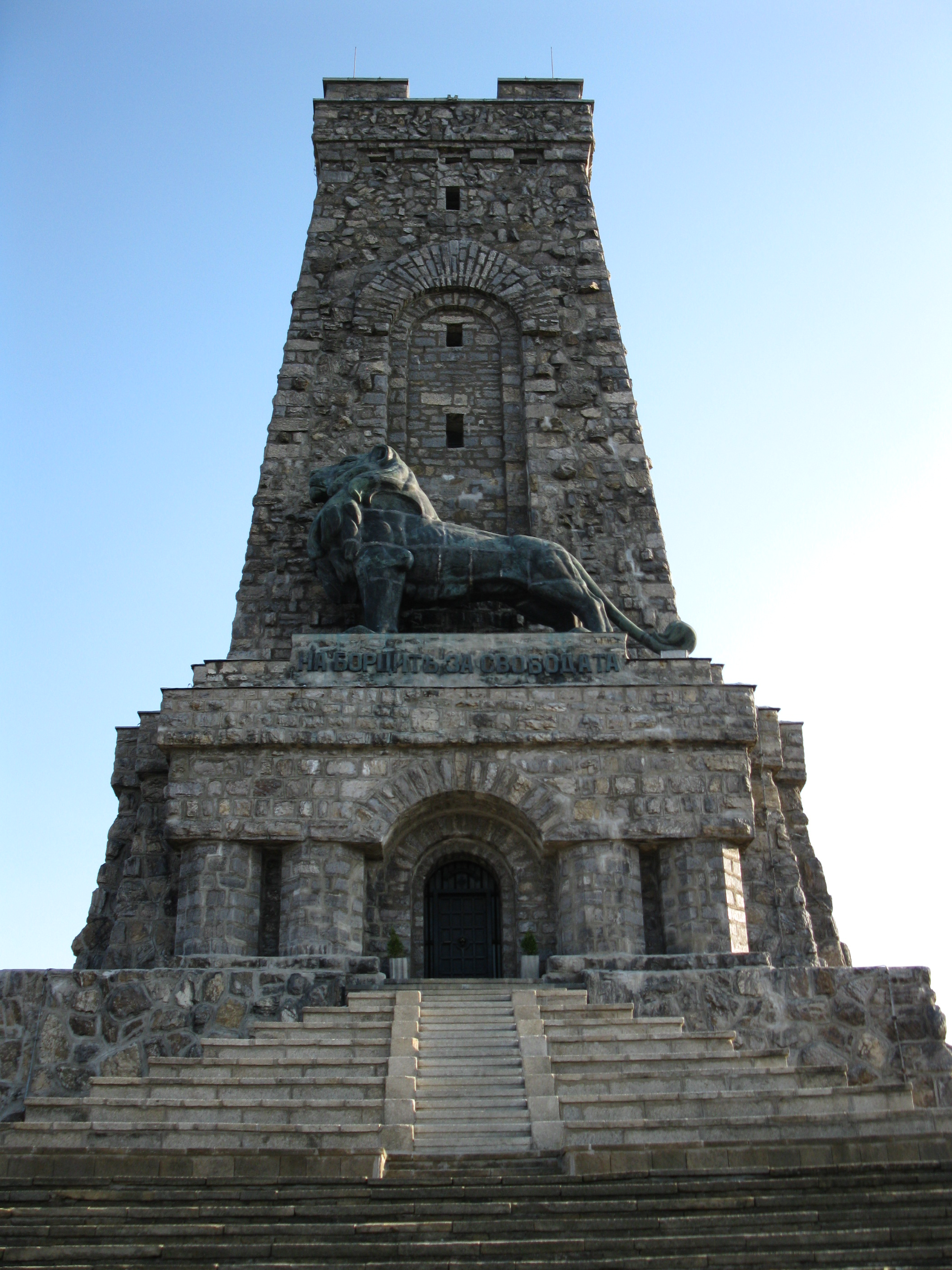

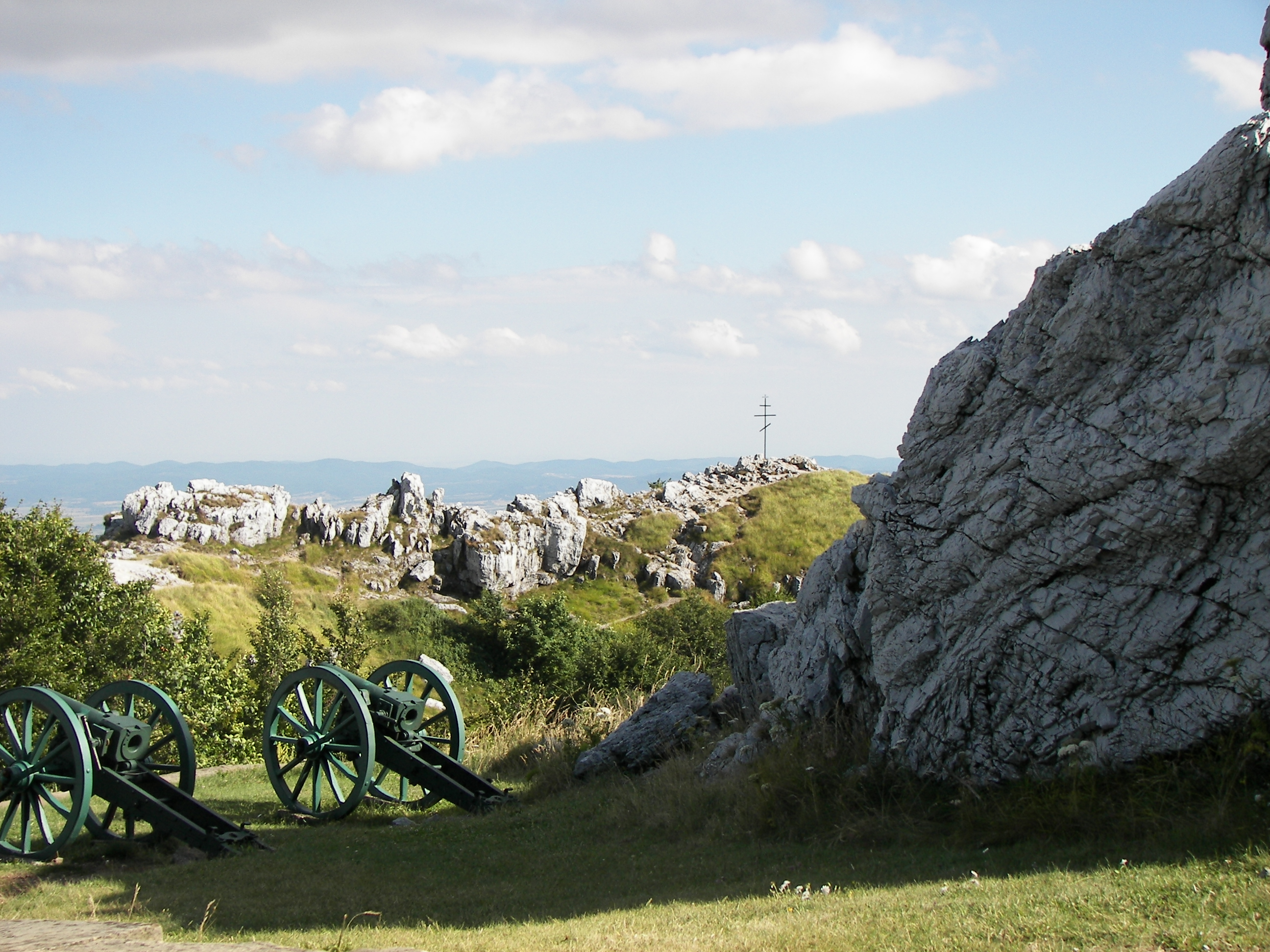

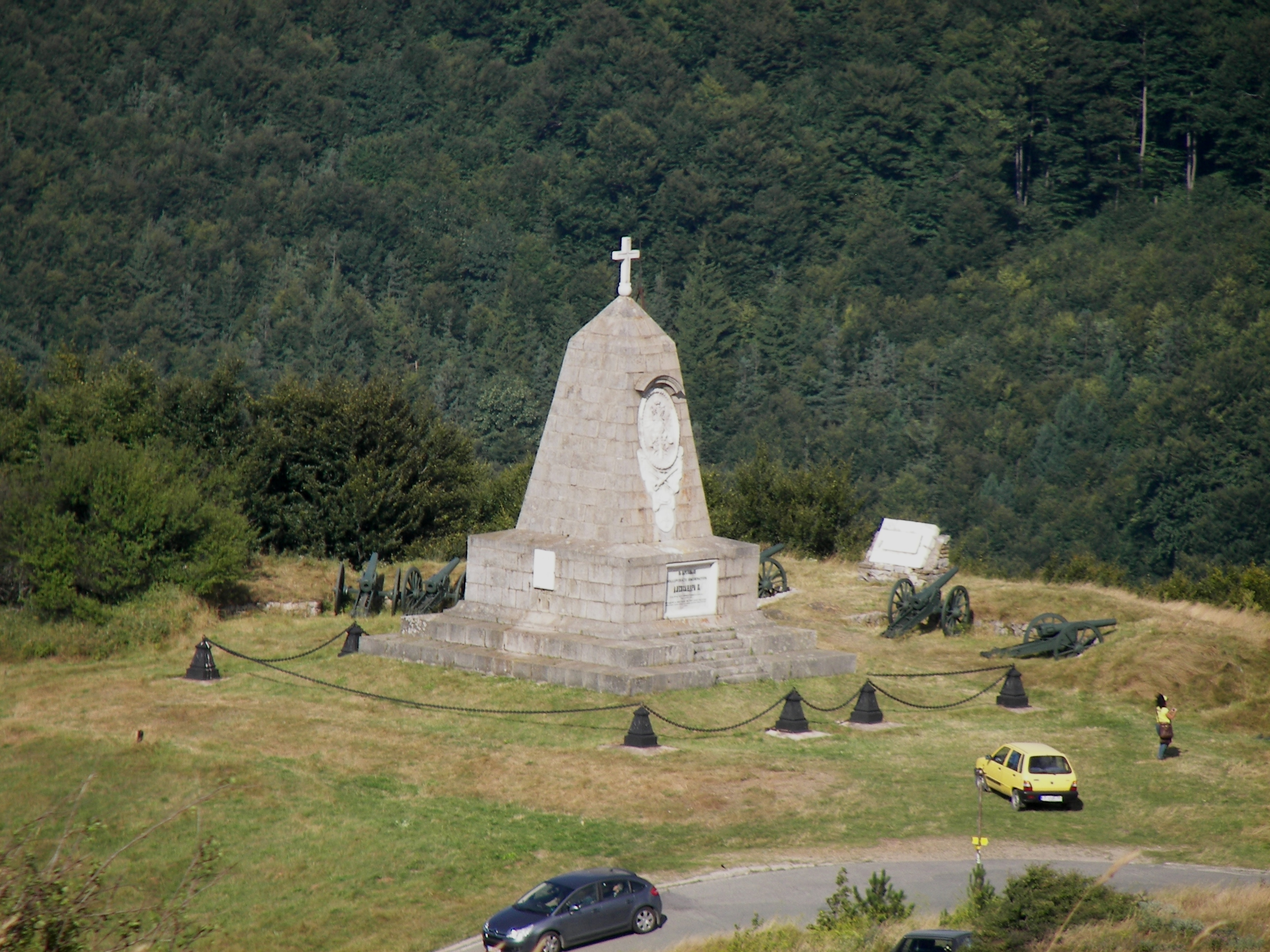

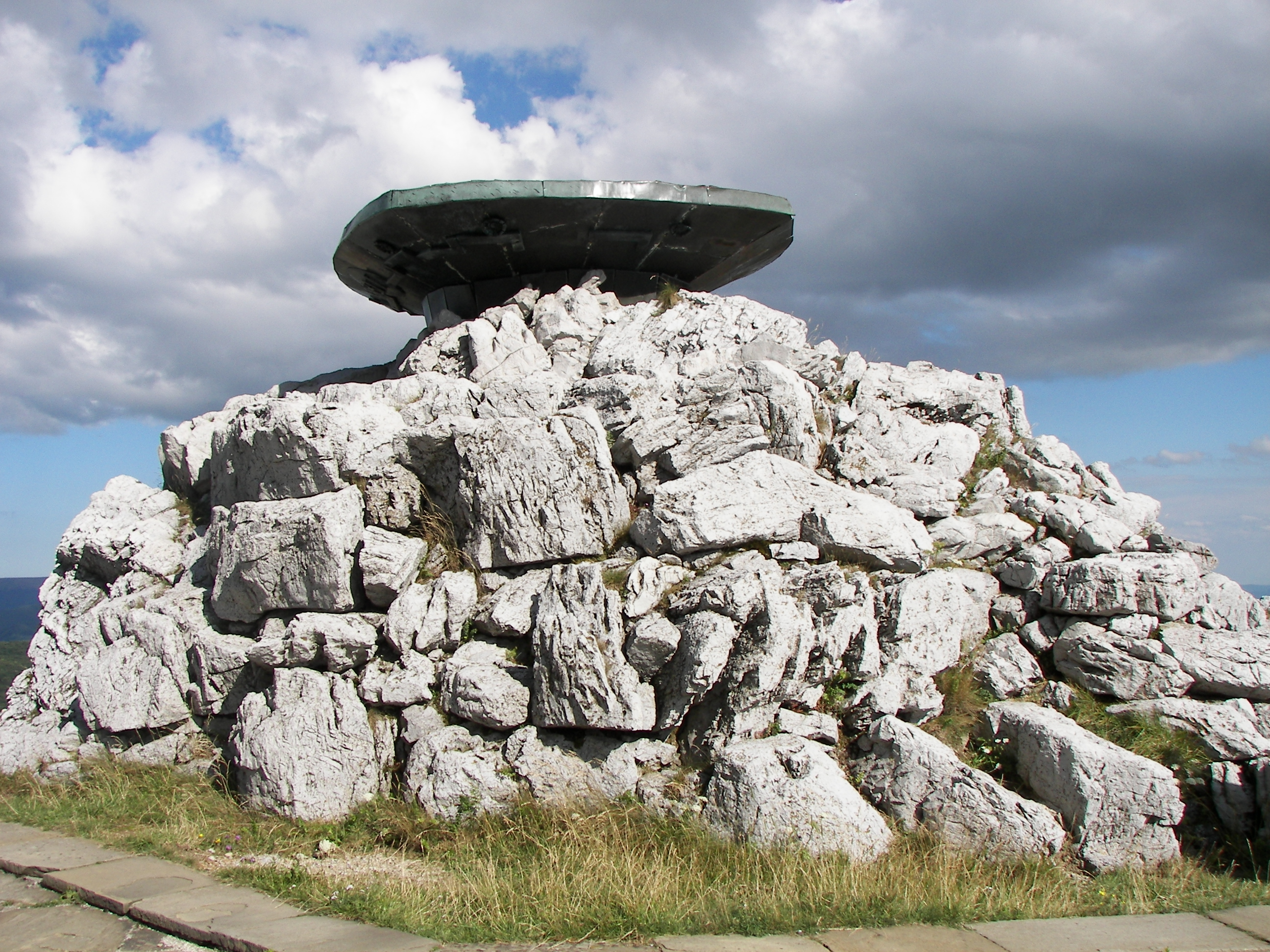

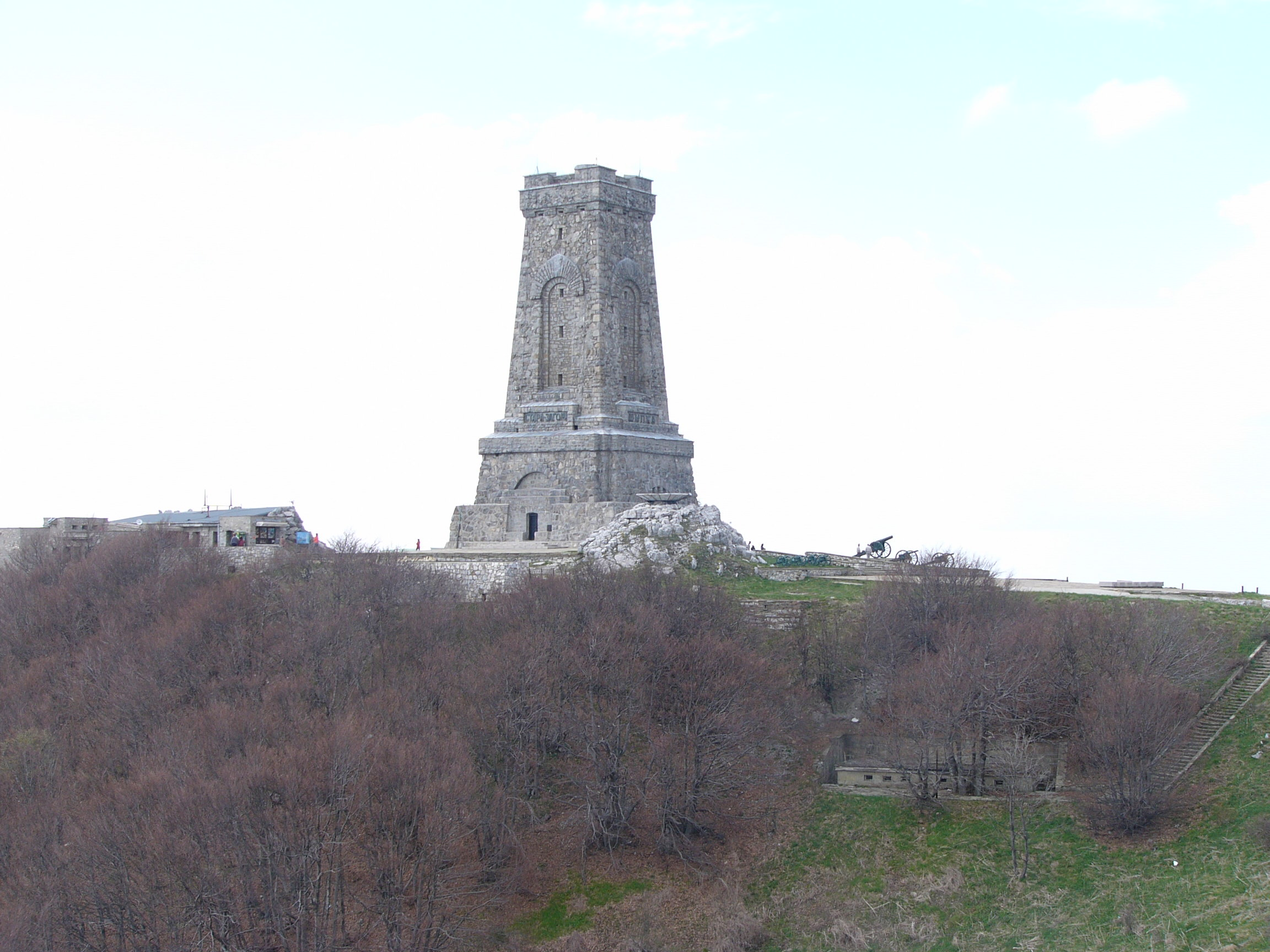

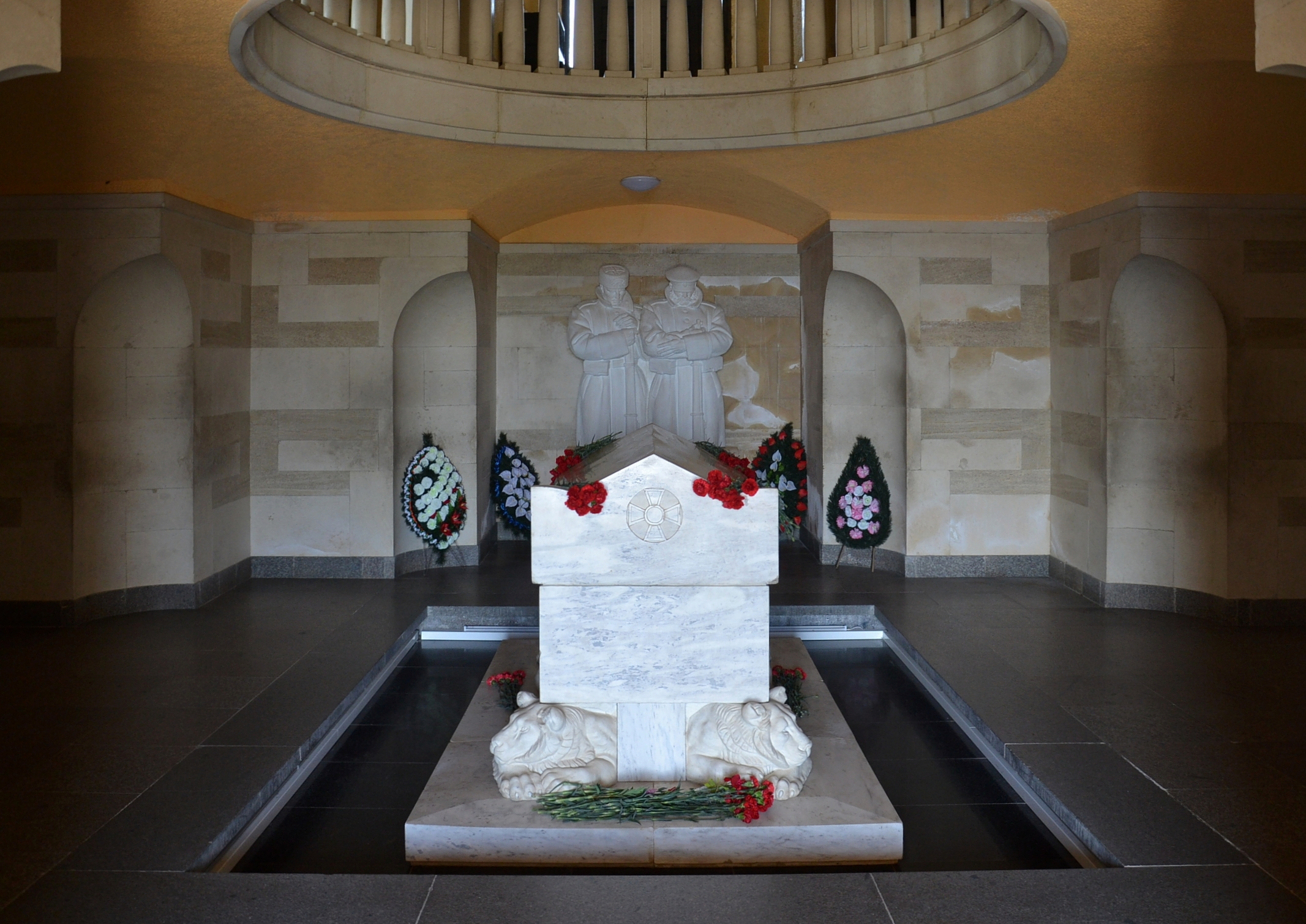
Sarcophagus

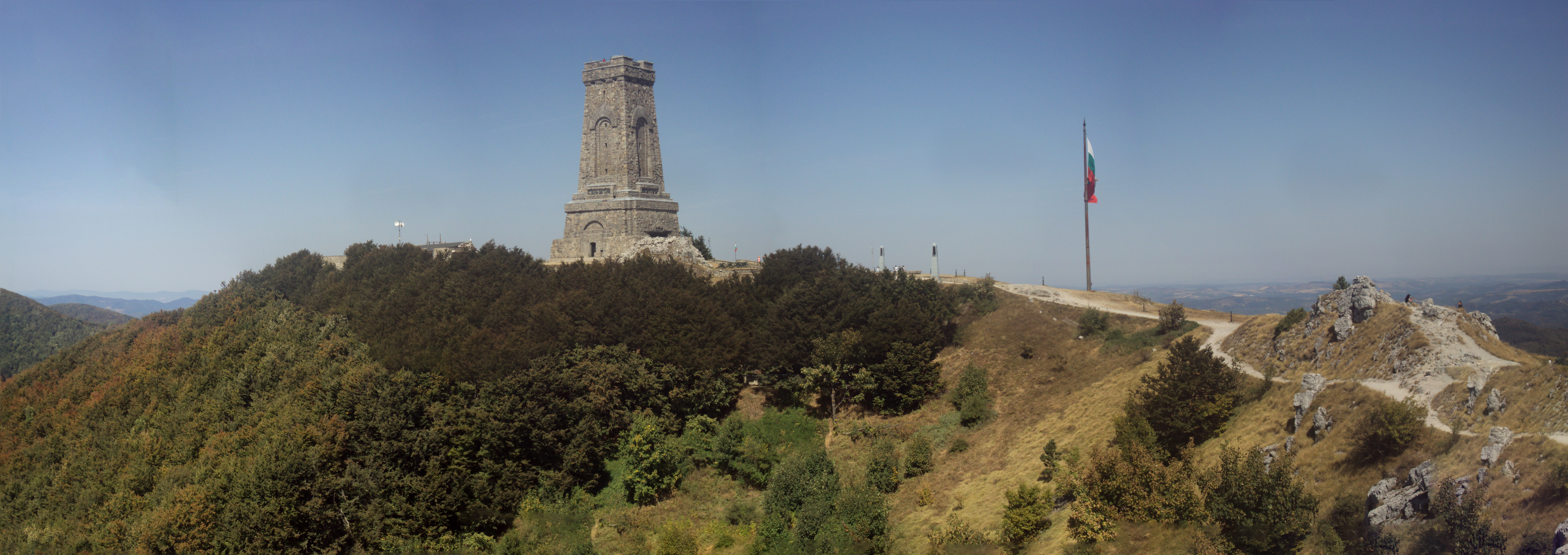

== See also ==
- Bulgarka Nature Park
- Epic of the Forgotten by Ivan Vazov
- Etar Architectural-Ethnographic Complex
- History of Bulgaria
- Gabrovo City
