= Battle of Shipka Pass =

1877–78 battle of the Russo-Turkish War (1877–1878)

- Part of the Russo-Turkish War (1877–1878)
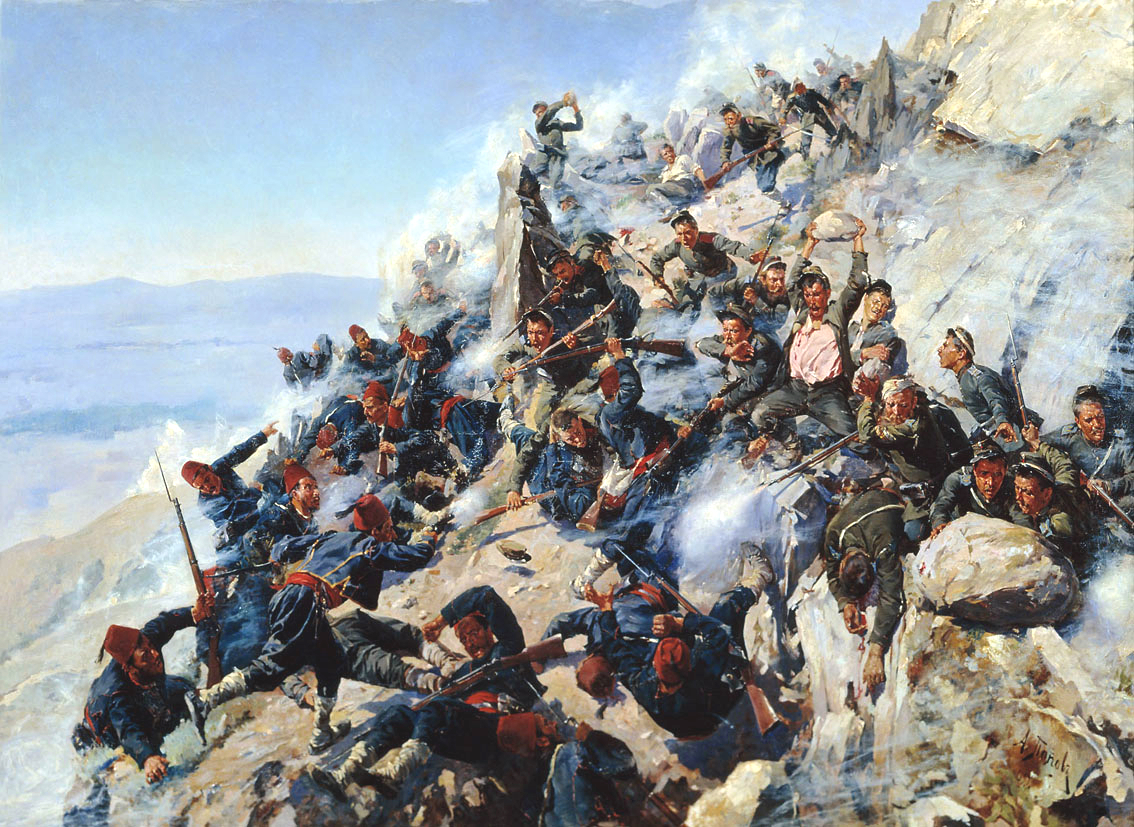
- The Defence of the Eagle's Nest, Alexey Popov, 1893
Date	July 17–19, 1877 (1st stage); August 21–26, 1877 (2nd stage); September 13–17, 1877 (3rd stage); January 5–9, 1878 (4th stage)
Location	Shipka Peak and surrounding areas, Ottoman Bulgaria 42°46′00″N 25°19′00″E
Result	Russo-Bulgarian victory (Note: All the stages)

Belligerents
Russian Empire (Principality of Bulgaria) Bulgarian Legion	Ottoman Empire

Commanders and leaders
(Russian Empire) Nikolay Svyatopolk-Mirsky (Russian Empire) Iosif Gurko (Russian Empire) Fyodor Radetsky: • (Principality of Bulgaria) Nikolay Stoletov (Note: He was a member of the Southern Detachment of Radetsky's troops and led Russo-Bulgarian units.); • (Russian Empire) Mikhail Skobelev (Note: He was also under Radetsky's overall command.) (4th Stage (Note: Svyatopolk-Mirsky, in conjunction with Skobelev, also acted under Radetsky.)); (Russian Empire) Mikhail Dragomirov (WIA) (Note: He approached Stoletov as reinforcements and was wounded the same day (thus out of action).) (2nd Stage)	Rauf Pasha (1st to 3rd Stages); Süleyman Hüsnü (2nd to 3rd Stages); Veysel Pasha (4th Stage)

Strength
I stage: 5,000; II stage: 5,000 initial; ~2,500 reinforcement 1st day; ~4,000 reinforcement 3rd day III stage: 7,500–7,900; IV stage: 66,000 Total: 70,000+	I stage: 4,000; II stage: 30,000; III stage: 20,000 plus reinforcements IV stage: 36,000+ Total: 60,000+

Casualties and losses
I stage: 150 or 211; II stage: 4,000 or 3,600; III stage: unknown IV stage: 5,500 total or 1,122 killed and 4,362 wounded Total: 13,500 killed and wounded	I stage: unknown II stage: 10,000; III stage: 3,000; IV stage: 36,000 captured incl. 6,000 sick and wounded; killed n.a. Total: 60,000
- Location within Bulgaria Battle of Shipka Pass (European Russia)

The Battle of Shipka Pass consisted of four battles that were fought between the Russian Empire, aided by Bulgarian volunteers known as opalchentsi, and the Ottoman Empire for control over the vital Shipka Pass during the Russo-Turkish War (1877–1878). The final battle is known as the battle of Shipka-Sheynovo or simply the battle of Sheynovo (Russian: Шипко-Шейновское сражение; Bulgarian: Шейновска битка).

In July 1877, four Russian corps crossed the Danube River and entered Bulgaria. Preceding the main Russian army, Iosif Gurko led a detachment of 11,000 men to capture the vital Balkan Mountain passes. In just over two weeks, Gurko had captured three important mountain passes but the main army was held up the day after Shipka Pass fell in the Siege of Pleven. Thus the defense of the pass was left to the Russian vanguard as well as Bulgarian volunteers. The Ottoman Army made two major attempts to retake the pass in 1877, but was unsuccessful, as the Russian and Bulgarian defenders were able to hold the pass against this overwhelming force, playing an important role in the war. The deciding moment of the Shipka campaign, and by extent the war, came in August 1877, when a group of 5,000 Bulgarian volunteers and 2,500 Russian troops repulsed an attack against the peak by a 30,000-strong Ottoman army.

The pass itself crosses the main ridge of the Balkan Mountains near the village of Shipka. It is a part of the main road from North to South, leading from Zistovi by Tirnovo and Eski Zagra to Adrianople.

== First battle ==
At the beginning of the war, Shipka Pass was held by an Ottoman garrison of 4,000 soldiers and 12 guns. It was ordered Nikolay Svyatopolk-Mirsky and Iosif Gurko to attack the positions simultaneously. On 17 July, Mirsky and his 2,000 men of the 36th Orlovsky Infantry Regiment plus Cossacks and artillery was ready to act. However, while advancing from South, Gurko's men skirmished with some Ottoman troops so they approached the pass in delay.

Mirsky attacked the same day but Turks repulsed this very first assault. Gurko arrived the next day with two infantry battalions and two companies of Cossacks and also attacked the pass. This second attack also failed. Despite beating back two Russian attacks, the Ottoman commanders at the Shipka Pass realized that they could not withstand the offensive. On the morning of 19 July, while pretending to consider the terms of surrender, the Ottoman garrison slipped away to the west in small groups, leaving behind a large cache of explosives, ammunition, and artillery. The strong position was finally occupied by the Russians.

== Second battle ==
The Second Battle of Shipka Pass took place in August 1877. After taking the pass in July 1877, the Russian forces built up a defensive position there. The Ottoman Tuna Army was effectively cut in half by the Balkan Mountain range. It was thought that if Pleven could be defended, the Russian Army would not move south without taking it.

General Gurko had been resting about the Shipka Pass with 5,000 men, including five battalions of Bulgarians. They were placed on three positions at St. Nicholas (today: Peak Stoletov), Central Hill and the reserves in between these two points.

Süleyman Hüsnü Pasha at Hersek was then ordered to prepare his experienced army and rush to relieve Osman Pasha at Pleven. It was not possible to reach Pleven by land as the terrain was very difficult. Süleyman loaded his 25,000 troops on transport ships at the Montenegrin port of Bar and sailed them through the Adriatic, around Morea, and then through the Aegean Sea and landed them at Dedeağaç, on the coast of Thrace. The troops were then loaded on trains to Filibe from which they marched towards the southern slopes of Shipka. Some 15 battalions under Reouf Pasha joined Süleyman until his army reached about 30,000 Ottomans determined to retake the pass instead of simply bypassing it.

On August 21, the Ottoman forces bombarded Russian positions and then made an attack against St. Nicholas. The attack was repulsed and the Ottoman forces dug in 100 yards (91 m) away. As the desperate fight raged, a regiment arrived from Selvi (now Sevlievo) to increase the defenders to 7,500. The next day the Ottoman forces moved their artillery up the mountainside and bombarded the pass while the infantry moved around the Russian flank.

On August 23, the Ottoman forces attacked all Russian positions, with the main effort again at St. Nicholas where most of the defenders were Bulgarian volunteers. The Ottoman forces thought that the volunteer positions would be easy to capture, but this turned out to be a miscalculation. Instead, the first unit to begin to retreat were the Russians on Central Hill. However, they rallied when the 4th Rifle Brigade, commanded by Fyodor Radetsky, arrived and all Ottoman attacks were repulsed.

On the 26th, an Ottoman attack on St. Nicholas (a position referred to as "the Eagle's Nest") reached the Russian trenches but was repulsed again by a Bulgarian bayonet charge. More Russian reinforcements arrived the same day and an attack was made against the Ottoman position but driven back to Central Hill. This ended the battle for all practical purposes. Suleiman entrenched himself in the position he then occupied, in a semi-circle round the southern end of the Russian position.

In these attacks, the Russians lost close on 4,000 men, while Süleyman losses approached 10,000 killed or wounded. The Bulgarians and Russians had made a gallant stand. Near the end of the fighting, having run out of ammunition, they threw rocks and bodies of fallen comrades to repulse the Ottoman attacks.

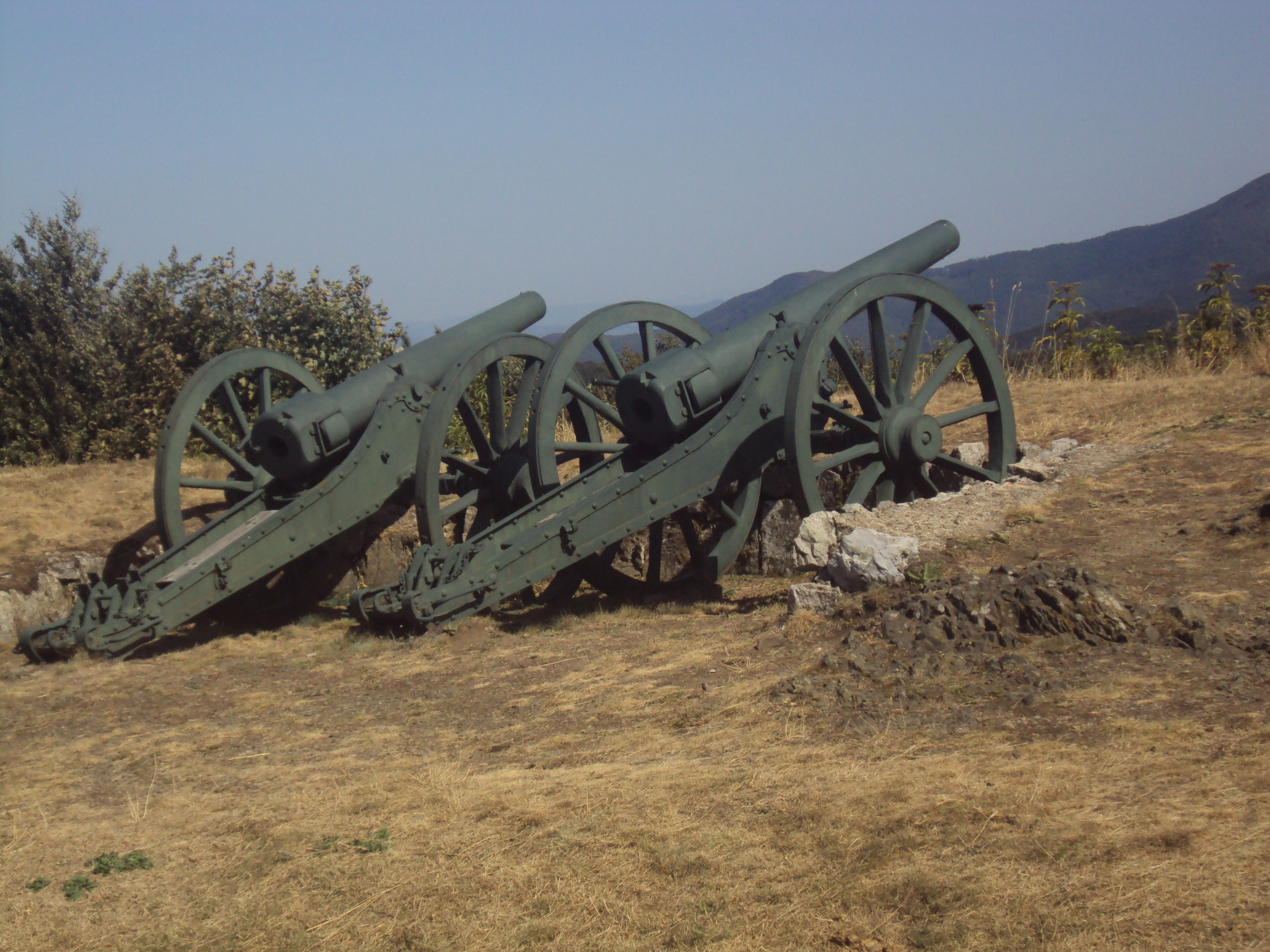
Cannons on Shipka pass

== Third battle ==
In September 1877, Suleiman Pasha made another attempt to retake the Shipka Pass from the Russians after the failed attempt in August. The Russian defenses had continually been improved since August but reinforcements were limited due to the siege of Pleven. On September 13, Suleiman began to shell the Russians. The bombardment continued in earnest until the 17th when Suleiman launched a frontal assault against the St. Nicholas position. Capturing the first line of trenches, the Ottoman forces moved towards the peak. General Fyodor Radetzky, now commanding the defenses, brought in reinforcements and a Russian counterattack drove the Ottoman forces from all captured ground. Secondary Ottoman assaults to the north were repulsed as well.

== Fourth battle ==
The Fourth Battle of Shipka Pass took place January 5–9, 1878. It was the final battle for Shipka Pass and a crushing Ottoman defeat.

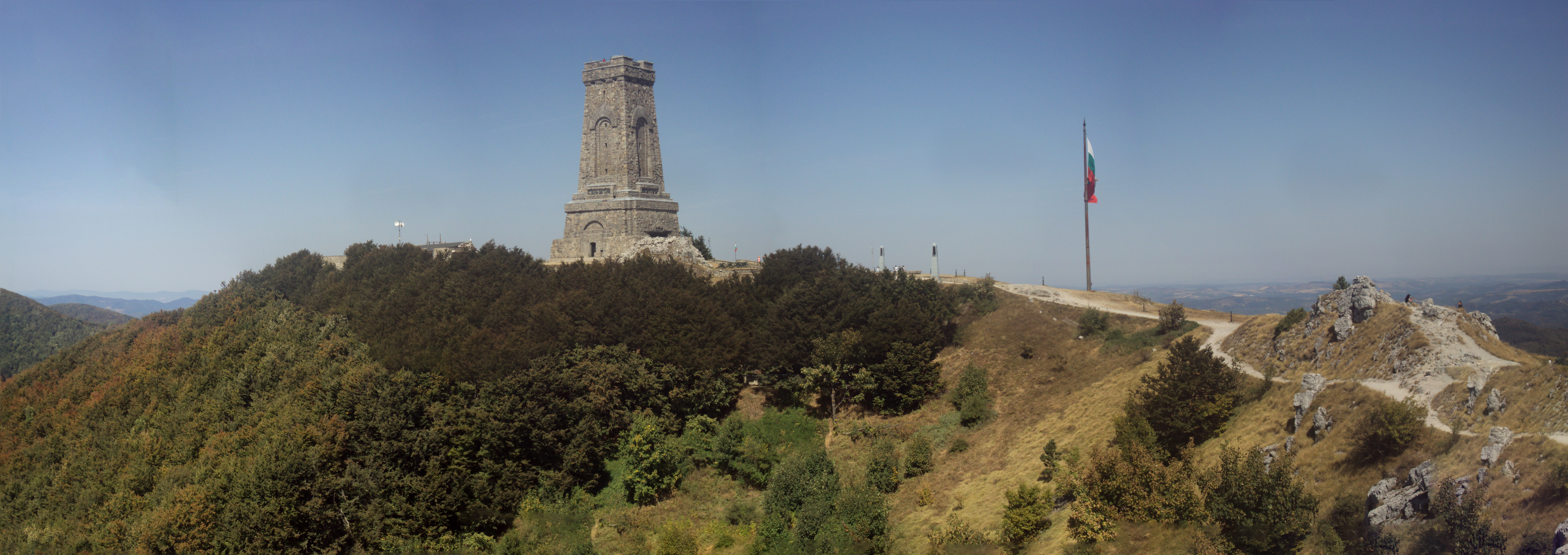
The Shipka Monument

=== Background ===
In December 1877, the fortress of Pleven surrendered to the Russian Army, freeing a significant number of Russian troops. General Gourko now had as many as 65,000 soldiers to contend with the Ottomans. Gourko forced the Araba Konak Pass and took Sofia. From Sofia, he moved south through the Balkan Mountains to cut off Ottoman access to Shipka Pass.

=== The battle ===
General Fyodor Radetzky, commanding the garrison, made preparations to attack from the pass on January 5 while Gourko brought up two columns under Generals Mikhail Skobelev and Nikolai Mirskii to cut off the Ottoman retreat. On January 8, Radezky's attack began but Skobelev was held up by unexpectedly heavy resistance and Mirskii attacked unsupported, making little progress. On January 9, Mirskii faced an Ottoman counter-attack, but Skobelev was able to move forward in support and defeat the Ottoman forces. Completely surrounded, the remaining Ottoman forces under Veissel Pasha surrendered the same day.

== Aftermath ==
The defensive victory at the Shipka Pass had strategic importance for the progress of the war. Had the Ottomans been able to take the pass, they would have been in a position to threaten the supply lines of the Russian and Romanian forces in Northern Bulgaria, and organize an operation to relieve the major fortress at Pleven which was under siege at that time. The war would have then been fought effectively only in northern Bulgaria from that point on, which would have led to a stalemate, which would have created a major advantage for the Ottoman Empire in peace negotiations.

The Bulgarian volunteers played a decisive role in defending the Shipka Pass, thus denying the Ottomans a major breakthrough and a chance to turn the tide of the war. This strategic defensive victory illustrated their important role in the war and was dramatized by the Bulgarian poet and writer Ivan Vazov in his ode The Volunteers at Shipka.

The victory at Shipka Pass ensured the fall of the Pleven fortress on December 10, 1877, and set the stage for the invasion of Thrace. It allowed Russian forces under Gourko to crush Suleiman Pasha's army at the Battle of Philippopolis several days later and threaten Constantinople.

With this victory and the conquest of Pleven at the end of 1877, the path towards Sofia was opened, and with it the path to victory in the war and a chance for Russia to gain an upper hand in the "Great Game" by establishing a sphere of influence in the Eastern Balkans.

Suleiman Pasha was later court-martialed due to the colossal failure at Shipka, even though the pass was already lost when he had arrived. His failure to seek alternatives, wasting of men and material that would have been essential later in the campaign, and his failure to secure his remaining troops were too blatant to forgive. He was initially sentenced to death but then commuted by Sultan Abdulhamid II and sent to exile in Baghdad.

Today the Shipka Pass is in the Bulgarka Nature Park and is home to a monument commemorating the warriors who died in the battle.

== See also ==
- Battles of the Russo-Turkish War (1877–1878)
- Epic of the Forgotten by Ivan Vazov
- Shipka Memorial
