= Süleyman Nesib =

Turkish politician

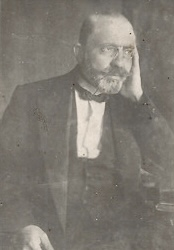

Personal details
- Born: 1866 Constantinople, Ottoman Empire
- Died: 1917 (aged 50–51)
- Parent: Süleyman Hüsnü Pasha (father)

Süleymanpaşazade Mehmed Sami, also known as Süleyman Nesib (1866–1917) was an Ottoman writer and educator during the Second Constitutional Era. He wrote for the Servet-i Fünun, a weekly newspaper in the Ottoman Empire.
