= Bulgarian Volunteer Corps =

Bulgarian volunteer army units

- Българско опълчение
- The standard of the Bulgarian Opaltchentsi
- Leader: Collective leadership
- Dates active: 1877–1878
- Headquarters: Sofia
- Active regions: Bulgaria
- Ideology: Bulgarian nationalism
- Size: 40,300
- Wars: the Serbian-Turkish Wars (1876-1878) and the Russo-Turkish War of 1877–1878

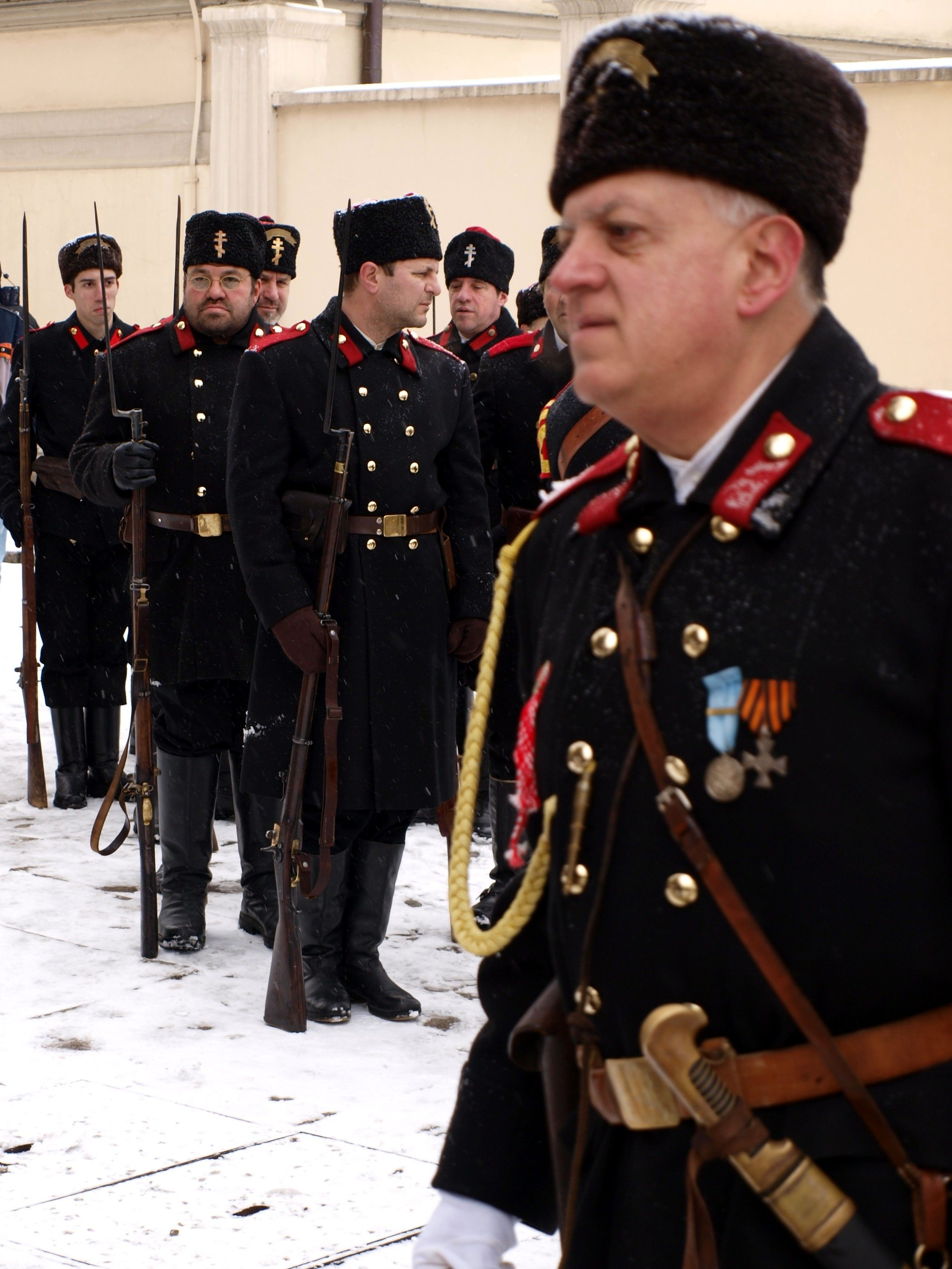
Reenactors dressed as Opalchentsi at the official commemoration of the 133 anniversary of the Liberation of Bulgaria

The Bulgarian Volunteer Corps (Bulgarian: Българско опълчение, romanized: Bŭlgarsko opŭlchenie, lit. 'Bulgarian militia', Russian: Болгарское ополчение, romanized: Bolgarskoye opolcheniye), which the members known as the Opalchentsi (Bulgarian: опълченци), were Bulgarian voluntary army units, who took part in the Russo-Turkish War of 1877–1878. The people in these units were called opalchenets-pobornik (опълченец-поборник) roughly meaning "folk-" or "regiment-combatant".

The Bulgarian voluntary army units for the Russo-Turkish War were gathered after the manifesto of Alexander II of Russia, announcing the War. The meeting point of the Bulgarian volunteers in Russia was the city of Samara. The Bulgarian Opalchentsi were given the Samara flag bearing the images of the Holy Mother and Saints Cyril and Methodius (the flag is kept in the National Museum of Military History in Sofia). The Opalchentsi took an active part in the Second and Fourth Battle of Shipka Pass and after the end of the war went on to form Bulgarian Army.

== Structure ==
Major General Nikolai Stoletov was appointed Chief of the Bulgarian militia, with his chief of staff being Colonel Efim Rinkiewicz. Other staff officers were also appointed - Colonel Engelhart, Lieutenant Colonel Fyodor De Preradovic and others. The command staff consisted of 136 officers, among which were Bulgarian officers and non-commissioned officers in the Russian Army:

- Lieutenant-Colonel Konstantin Kesyakov,
- Captain Raicho Nikolov,
- Lieutenants Peter Alexiev, Delev, Petko Stoyanov, Konstantin Shivarov, Atanas Uzunov, Dimitar Filov, Danail Nikolaev, Stefan Lyubomski,
- Sub-lieutenants Stefan Kissov, Avram Gudzhev, Olympiy Panov and Costa Panitsa.

Friendly doctors were appointed, including the Bulgarians Konstantin Bonev, Sava Mirkov, Konstantin Vesenkov, Andrei Bogdanov, Ivan Panov, Yakov Petkovich.

The militias were trained by Russian officers. They were armed with the Chassepot rifle, which was bought by the Ministry of Defense and the Moscow Slavic Committee. In terms of numbers and structure, the militia was comparable to a reinforced wartime infantry division. It consisted of 3 militia brigades, each consisting of 2 militia "druzhina" (the equivalent of a battalion) of 5 companies each. Later on, 6 more independent detachments formed later are included.

The Bulgarian militia units were commanded by:

- 1st Militia Brigade, commanded by Colonel Korsakov,
- 2nd Militia Brigade, commanded by Colonel Leonid Vyazemski,
- 3rd Militia Brigade, commanded by Colonel Mikhail Tolstoy.

Other independent detachments were:

- 7th Militia druzhina, commanded by Lieutenant-colonel Tizenkhausen,
- 8th Militia druzhina, commanded by Staff-captain Merchanski,
- 9th Militia druzhina, commanded by Lieutenant-colonel Lvov,
- 10th Militia druzhina, commanded by Major Dorshlung,
- 11th Militia druzhina, commanded by Lieutenant-colonel Gasparevski,
- 12th Militia druzhina, commanded by Major Kornilovech.

== Honours ==
One of the poems in Ivan Vazov's Epic of the Forgotten, namely "Opalchentsite na Shipka", is dedicated to them. Opalchenie Peak in Vinson Massif, Antarctica, is named after the Bulgarian Volunteer Force in the 1877–1878 Russo-Turkish War and the Macedonian-Adrianopolitan Volunteer Corps in the 1912–1913 Balkan Wars.

== See also ==
- Samara flag
- Romanian War of Independence
