= The Volunteers at Shipka =

Poem by Ivan Vazov

The Volunteers at Shipka (Bulgarian: Опълченците на Шипка, romanized: Opalchentsite na Shipka, also known as "Oh, Shipka!") is an ode by the classic Bulgarian writer Ivan Vazov, a part of the cycle Epic of the Forgotten.

The ode is dedicated to the fight of the Bulgarian Volunteer Corps (the opalchentsi) that lead to the liberation of Bulgaria from Ottoman rule. The subtitle of the work is "11 August 1877". This adds historicity and the documentary nature of the subject.

Historical figures and events mentioned in the poem are:

- Battle of Kleidion (1014, mentioned as "old Belasitsa")
- Batak massacre (1876, during the April Uprising)
- Battle of Thermopylae (480 BC)
- Suleiman Pasha
- Xerxes

"The Volunteers at Shipka" is one of the most popular Bulgarian poems. For decades it has been studied in detail in primary and secondary school by Bulgarian children, who learn parts or the whole text by heart.
