= Nikolai Stoletov =

Russian general (1831–1912)

Nikolai Grigorevich Stoletov
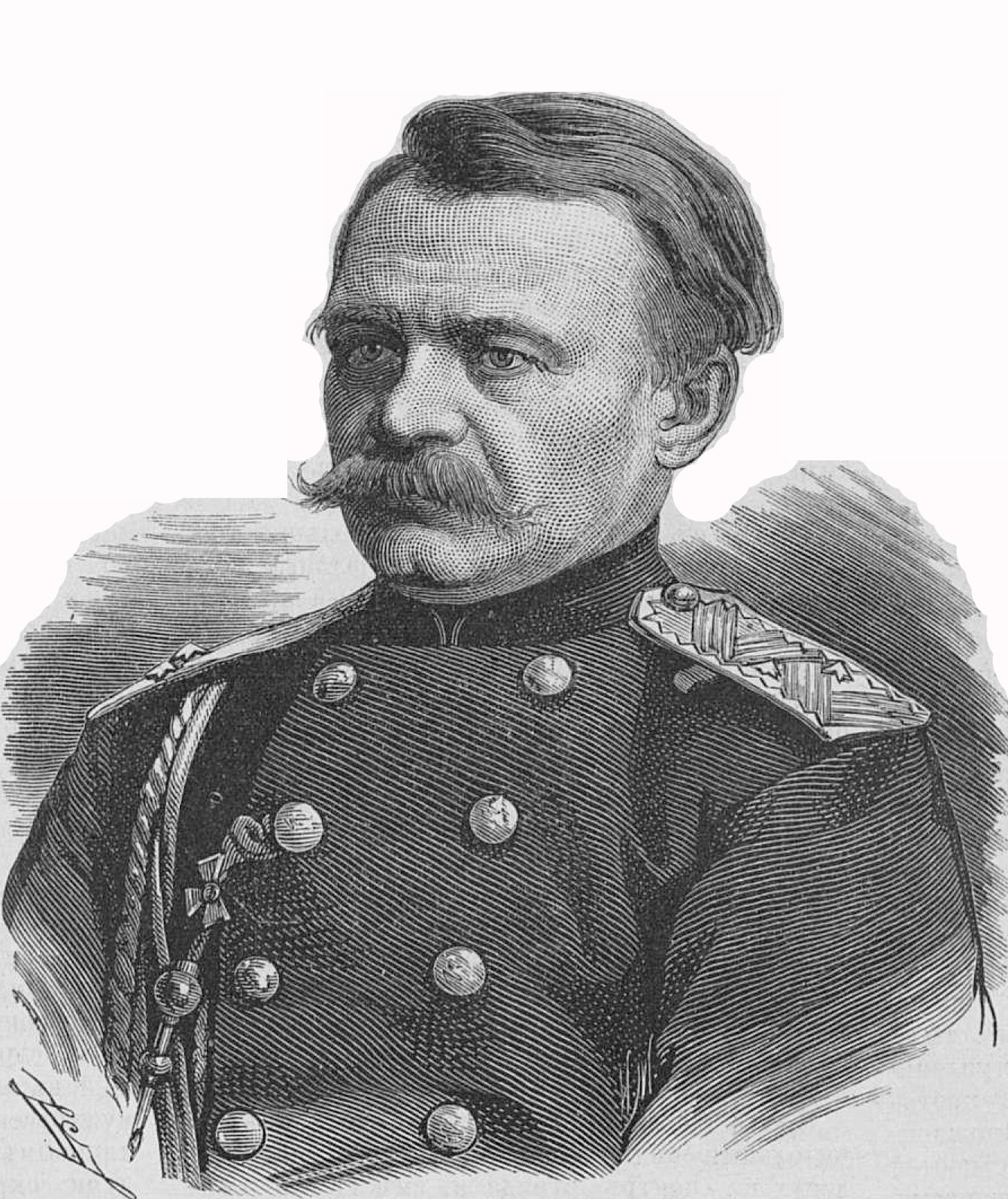
- Major General Stoletov in 1877
- Born: 14 November 1834; Vladimir, Vladimir Governorate, Russian Empire
- Died: 10 July 1912 (aged 77); Tsarskoye Selo, Saint Petersburg, Russian Empire
- Military career
- Allegiance: Russian Empire (1854–77, 1878–98); Tsardom of Bulgaria (1877–78)
- Branch: (Russian Empire) Imperial Russian Army; Bulgarian Army
- Service years: 1854–1898
- Rank: General of the Infantry
- Conflicts: Caucasian War; Crimean War; Russo-Turkish War
- Awards: Order of St. George; Order of St. Vladimir; Order of Saint Anna

Nikolai Grigorevich Stoletov (Russian: Столетов, Николай Григорьевич; 14 November [O.S. 2 November] 1834 – 10 July [O.S. 27 June] 1912) was a general in the Imperial Russian and Bulgarian armies. He was the brother of physicist Aleksandr Stoletov.

Stoletov was born in Vladimir and attended the Vladimir Gymnasium (grammar school) and the Physics faculty of the Moscow State University graduating in 1854. He joined the Russian army in 1854 and fought in the Crimean War, participating in the Battle of Inkermann and the Siege of Sevastopol.

Stoletov graduated from the General Staff Academy in 1859. In the 1860s Stoletov took part in the Russian conquest of Turkestan and was a major participant in the Russo-Turkish War of 1877-78. During this conflict he commanded the Russian and Bulgarian forces at the 2nd battle of the Shipka Pass.

After the end of the Russo Turkish War Stoletov was made Lieutenant General and appointed commander of the Turkestan Military District and participated in a diplomatic mission to Afghanistan. This mission indirectly led to a confrontation between Afghanistan and the British Empire, as the British demanded that the Afghans also accept a British mission, and when the Amir Sher Ali Khan refused, the British invaded, beginning the Second Anglo-Afghan War.

He retired in 1898 and died at Tsarskoye Selo.

== Sources ==
- This article is sourced from Russian Wikipedia
- бастионах Севастополя и Шилкинском перевале//Ляшук Павел. «Таврические ведомости», 25 марта 1994, No. 11 (121), с. 5
- Page in Russian Language
