= Süleyman Hüsnü Pasha =

Ottoman Turkish military commander (1838–1892)

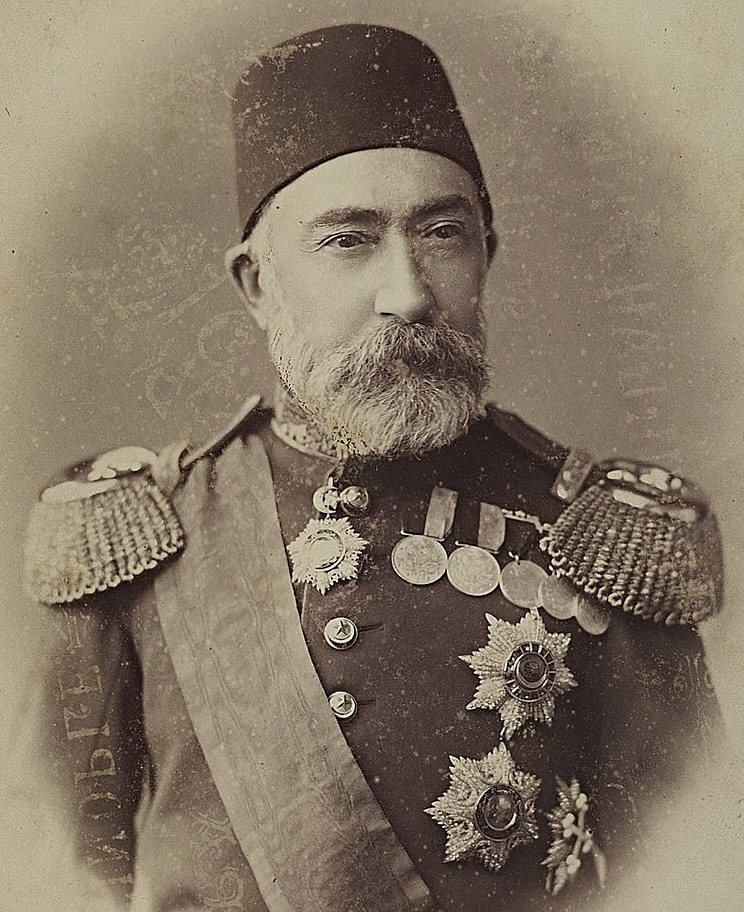
- Photograph c. 1870s

Personal details
- Born: 1838 Constantinople, Ottoman Empire
- Died: 8 August 1892 (aged 53–54) Baghdad, Ottoman Empire
- Children: Süleyman Nesib
- Education: Ottoman Military College

Military service
- Allegiance: Ottoman Empire
- Branch/service: Ottoman Army
- Years of service: 1863–1892
- Rank: Field marshal
- Battles/wars: Russo-Turkish War (1877–78); Battle of Elena; Battle of Eski Zagra (1878); Battle of Shipka Pass; Battle of Plovdiv (1878)

Süleyman Hüsnü Pasha (Turkish: Süleyman Hüsnü Paşa; 1838–1892) was an Ottoman Turkish field marshal who participated in the Russo-Turkish War of 1877–78.

== Biography ==
He was born in Istanbul; his father was a candy merchant. He was graduated from the military school in 1859. He served as an officer in Yeni Pazar, Herzegovina and Shkodër. He became a major in 1867 then served in Crete. Due to his success during the Crete Rebellion he was promoted two times in succession in 1872 and 1873 to become a mirliva. He then served as the commander of the military schools. He played an important role in displacement of Sultan Abdulaziz and Murad V's accession to the throne. On May 30, 1876, and was made general of division by Murad V.

He was the chief commander of Ottoman military operations in the Balkan Peninsula during the Russo-Turkish War (1877–78). He was considered as the reason of provocation against the Ottoman government. After that war he was sent into military tribunal and then to exile to Baghdad by the Ottoman authorities.
