= Epic of the Forgotten =

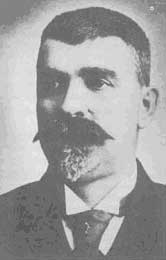
Ivan Vazov (1850–1921)

Epic of the Forgotten (Bulgarian: Епопея на забравените; Epopeya na zabravenite) is a cycle of 12 odes composed by Bulgarian writer Ivan Vazov between 1881 and 1884. The poems deal with people and events connected with Bulgaria's struggle for national liberation against the Ottoman Empire.

== Background ==
Vazov wrote the cycle to commemorate the Bulgarian fight for freedom against the Ottoman Empire and to criticize the moral decline of the Bulgarian nation after the Liberation, in comparison to the heroic figures and events of the then recent past. It could be said that the "Epic" formed the Bulgarian national consciousness and created many of the Bulgarian historical legends and myths. It served as an interpretation of the struggle against the Ottoman Empire and mostly the April Uprising, not in its real values (the limited number of participants and the military failure of the uprising) but in its morals. The Bulgarian fight for freedom was interpreted as a sacred act of heroes exactly because it did not have any perceivable chance of success. Despite the lack of demographic, military and other such possibilities of success against the Ottoman Empire which was still militarily resilient, the Bulgarians toiled under dire circumstances against it. The failure itself turned into a moral success and granted the Bulgarians the right to be free.

== Contents ==
In published collections, the poems are arranged by their time of composition, rather than by the chronological order of the depicted events.

- "Levski"
- "Benkovski"
- "Kocho (The Defense of Perushtitsa)"
- "Zhekov Brothers"
- "Kableshkov"
- "Paisii"
- "Miladinov Brothers"
- "Rakovski"
- "The Karadja"
- "1876"
- "Volov"
- "The Volunteers at Shipka"

== Sources ==
- Ivan Vazov. Epic of the Forgotten, Bulgarian-English Dual Language Text
- Epic of the Forgotten (partly translated)
