= Slavcho =

Slavcho (cyrillic: Славчо) is a given name. Notable people with the given name include:

- Slavcho Atanasov (born 1968), Bulgarian politician
- Slavcho Batinkov, Bulgarian cross-country skier
- Slavcho Binev (1965–2026), Bulgarian politician and former taekwondo
- Slavcho Chervenkov (born 1955), Bulgarian heavyweight freestyle wrestler
- Slavcho Krumov (1975–2026), Bulgarian politician
- Slavcho Pavlov (born 1968), Bulgarian footballer and manager
- Slavcho Shokolarov (born 1989), Bulgarian footballer
- Slavcho Slavov (born 1937), Bulgarian volleyball player
- Slavcho Toshev (born 1980), Bulgarian footballer
- Slavcho Vasev (1906–1990), Bulgarian writer and politician

== See also ==
- Slavčo, related given name
