= Krumov =

Krumov (Cyrillic: Крумов) is a Bulgarian surname. is a surname. Notable people with the name include:

- Vasil Krumov Bozhkov (born 1956), Bulgarian politician and businessman
- Kircho Krumov (born 1983), Bulgarian footballer
- Leonard Krumov (born 1996), Italian rugby union player
- Petar Krumov (composer) (1934–2021), Bulgarian composer, arranger and conductor
- Petar Krumov (wrestler) (born 1941), Bulgarian wrestler
- Plamen Krumov (footballer, born 1975), Bulgarian footballer
- Plamen Krumov (footballer, born 1985), Bulgarian footballer and manager
- Slavcho Krumov (1975–2026), Bulgarian politician

== See also ==
- Krumov Kamak, a small nunatak on Livingston Island, one of the South Shetland Islands in Western Antarctica
