= Slavčo =

Slavčo is a given name. Notable people with the given name include:

- Slavčo Georgievski (born 1980), Macedonian footballer
- Slavčo Temelkovski (born 2000), Macedonian basketball player

== See also ==
- Slavcho, related given name
