= Temelkovski =

Temelkovski is a surname. Notable people with the surname include:

- Borko Temelkovski (1919–2001), Macedonian politician
- Ilija Temelkovski, Macedonian handball coach
- Lui Temelkovski (born 1954), Canadian politician
- Slavčo Temelkovski (born 2000), Macedonian basketballer
