= Petya Dubarova =

Bulgarian poet (1962–1979)

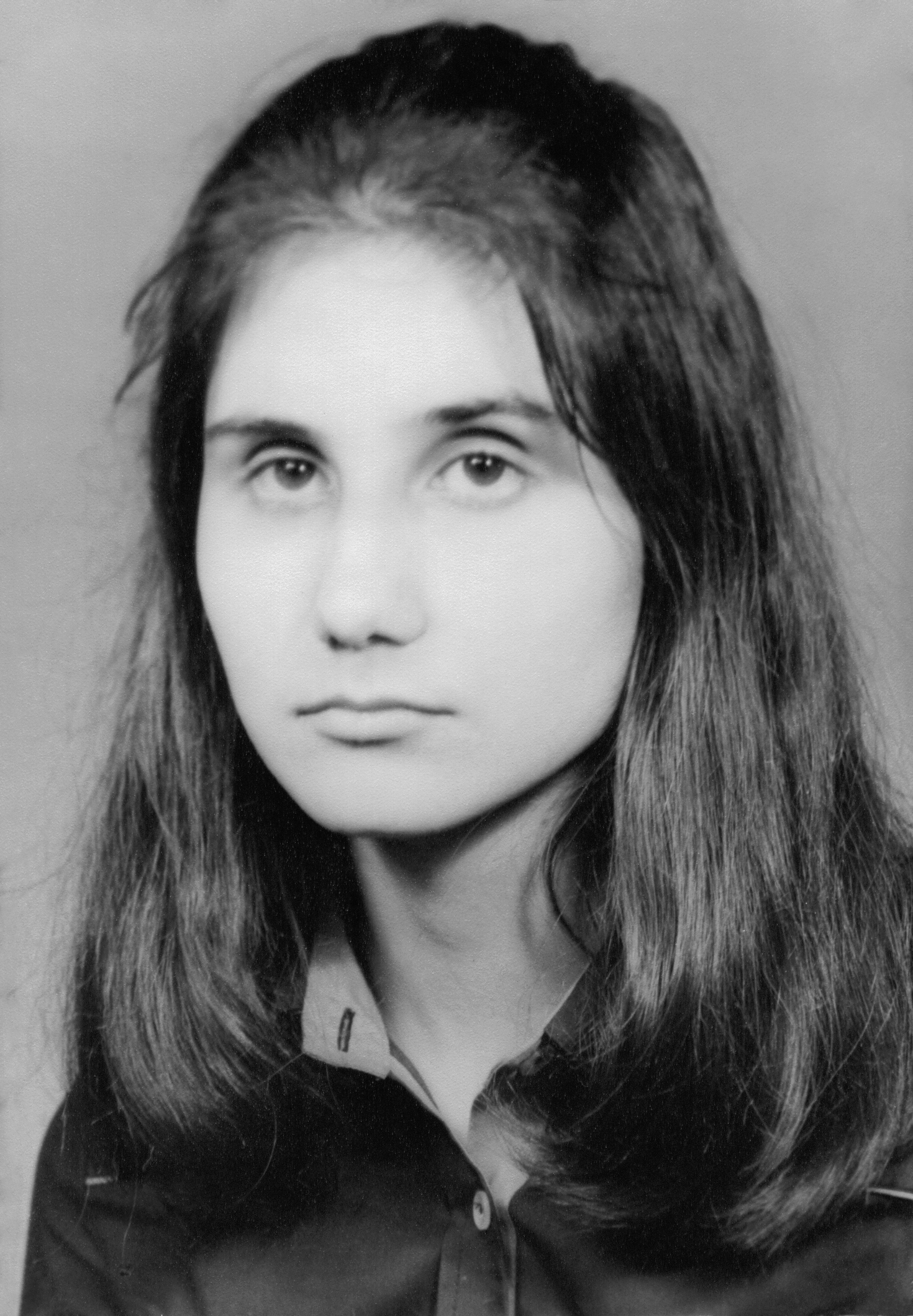
- Aged 16
- Native name: Петя Стойкова Дубарова
- Born: 25 April 1962 Burgas, Bulgaria
- Died: 4 December 1979 (aged 17) Burgas, Bulgaria
- Occupation: Poet

Website
- www.museumdubarova.com

Petya Stoykova Dubarova (Bulgarian: Петя Стойкова Дубарова) (April 25, 1962 – December 4, 1979) was a Bulgarian poet.

== Life ==
Dubarova was born and lived in the seaside town of Burgas, Bulgaria.

Dubarova studied at an English high school in Burgas (named after poet Geo Milev). There, she read her work to her classmates multiple times. Although she earned fame at a very young age, which defines her as "the youngest of the big Bulgarian artists", she did not have friends. She was described as a studious student, talkative, and smiled a lot.

Dubarova published poems in youth newspapers and magazines such as: Septemvriyche, Rodna Rech (Mother Tongue), and Mladezh (Youth). By when she was aged 12, her writing had been accepted for publication in literary journals for adult readership. Her mentors in writing were Hristo Fotev and Grigor Lenkov.

Some of Dubarova's poems became songs, which became popular in Bulgaria in the 1980s: Зимна ваканция (Winter holidays), Пролет (Spring), Доброта (Kindness), Лунапарк (Fun-fair), Нощ над града (Night over the city).

In 1978, Dubarova participated in the film Trampa (The Swap) by Georgi Djulgerov. During the shooting of the film in Samokov, at night, in the disco in the resort Borovets, Petya met a Swedish man named Per, whom she fell in love with. He remained her first and only love. In her diary, she describes him as „далечния, светлия, чаровния, нежния“ (the distant one, the bright one, the charming one and the gentle one). They corresponded through letters for a period, but he would abruptly stop writing to her, which had deeply upset Dubarova. It is evidenced from her diary entries during her last year of life that Dubarova's thoughts were consumed by despair and a sense of disappointment in humanity.

== Diary entries ==
Dubarova kept a diary, which she frequently wrote in. After her death it was published in incompletion.

"The human is a negligible thing! Negligible! It wanders all its life, fights, creates something, but in the frames of its own human existence - it can't go over it. Look, if every human was a sun, a planet..." (9 October 1978)

The last but one writing is from the 7th of September 1979. Then, Petya writes a confession:

"The most paradoxical in me is that suffering makes me happy. There is something great in suffering, something raising... How I imagine suffering - neon light, two unusually beautiful eyes, sadly calm, not staring anywhere, some kindness, prayer, dedication in them, from the neon they look black, but maybe they are brown, blue - no! A sad agreement, not reconciliation, but a sad agreement with everything they've lived through! And two hands, naked to their elbows, tightly hold a tall glass of beer. This is suffering. I have seen suffering. It was so close to me - on the table next to me. And how I had wished for it!"

"I don't know why, but I'd always been immensely happy. I despise those who need a certain cause to be happy - or to fall in love, or to achieve something. Sometimes my happiness was so painful, I've barely fought with it, to survive, not to get exhausted of its maddening power."

"I don't want to live blindly...Everything is so cursed, somewhere on the inside, from the depths of life, it smells rotten. But I want to believe there are worthy people, people pure and irreplaceable. If there really are, they must be unhappy..."

== Death ==
Dubarova died by suicide after taking sleeping pills on 3 December 1979. She died the following day, 4 December 1979, at the age of 17.

After Dubarova's death, many rumours were spread. The most popular one is that the Young Communist League organized regularly "voluntary" work in a beer factory. Petya was accused that she purposefully had broken a machine's counter which counted the beer bottles. She could not prove her innocence, and could not bear the injustice.

Dubarova left a note that says:

"Измамена (Deceived)

Младост (Youth)

Прошка (Forgiveness)

Сън (Sleep)

Спомен (Memory)

Зад стените на голямата къща (Behind the walls of the big house)

ТАЙНА (SECRET)"

According to Dubarova's English teacher, the day after her funeral, Petya's school woke up to walls covered in graffiti such as "Mamka vi!" (F*ck you/Motherf*ckers!) and "Teachers murderers!" (near the teachers' room). The local poet Veselin Andreev accused the teachers as well, by quoting Dubarova's mother's words at the funeral: "They killed my child!".

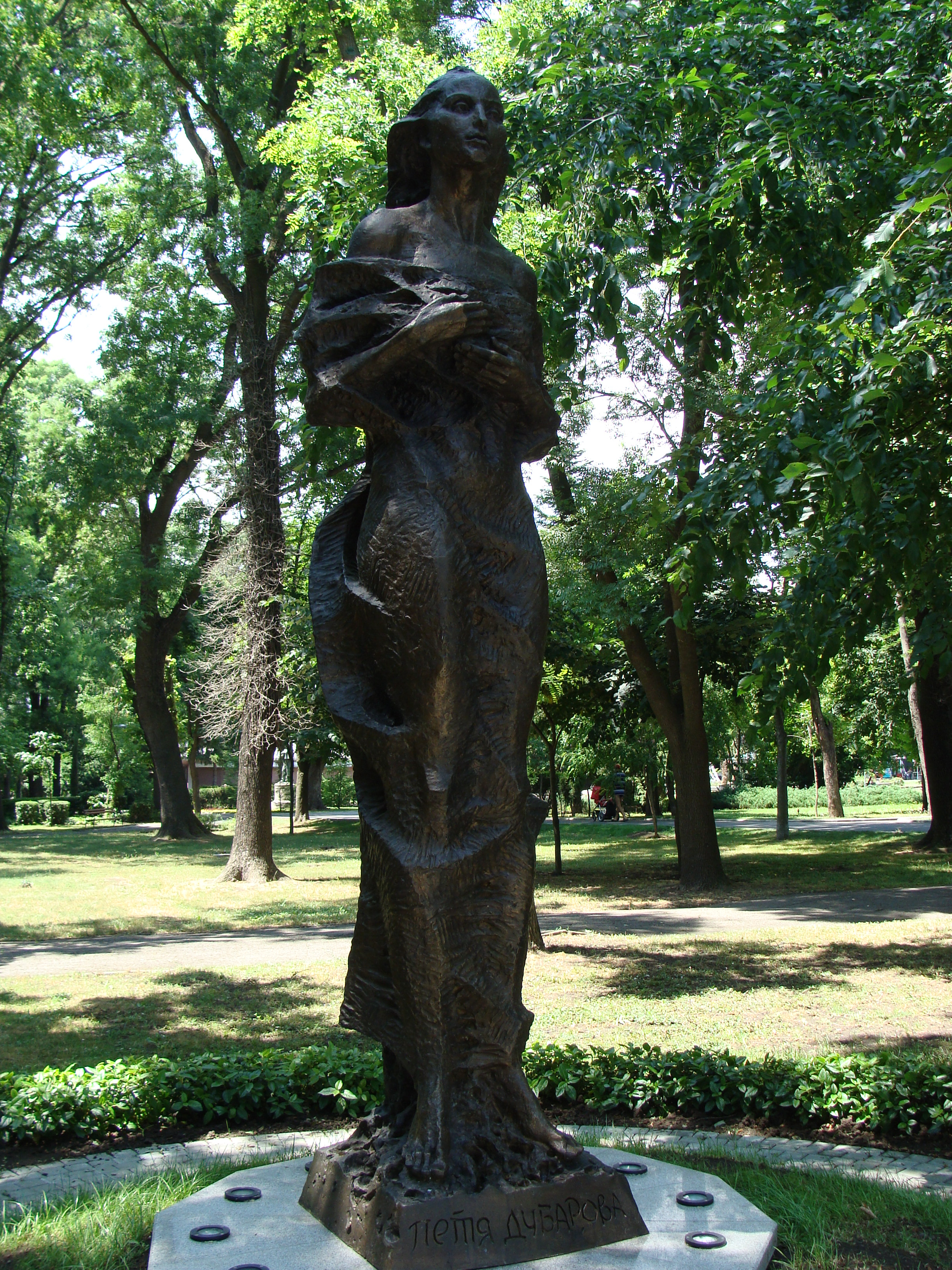
Dubarova's statue in Burgas

== Commemoration ==
- A statue of Dubarova by sculptor Radostin Damaskov was unveiled in the Sea Garden in Burgas in 2010.
- A street in a residential complex in the Bulgarian capital Sofia is named after Dubarova.
- South African poet and writer Abigail George published the book Letter to Petya Dubarova.

== Selected works ==
=== Poems ===
- "Az i Moreto" (The Sea and Me) (1980)
- "Lyastovitsa. Stihove i Razkazi" (Swallow. Poems and short stories) (1987)

=== Translations ===
- Dubarova's poetry has been posthumously translated into English by Don D. Wilson in Here I Am, in Perfect Leaf Today (1992).
