= Dryanovo Monastery =

- Дряновски манастир
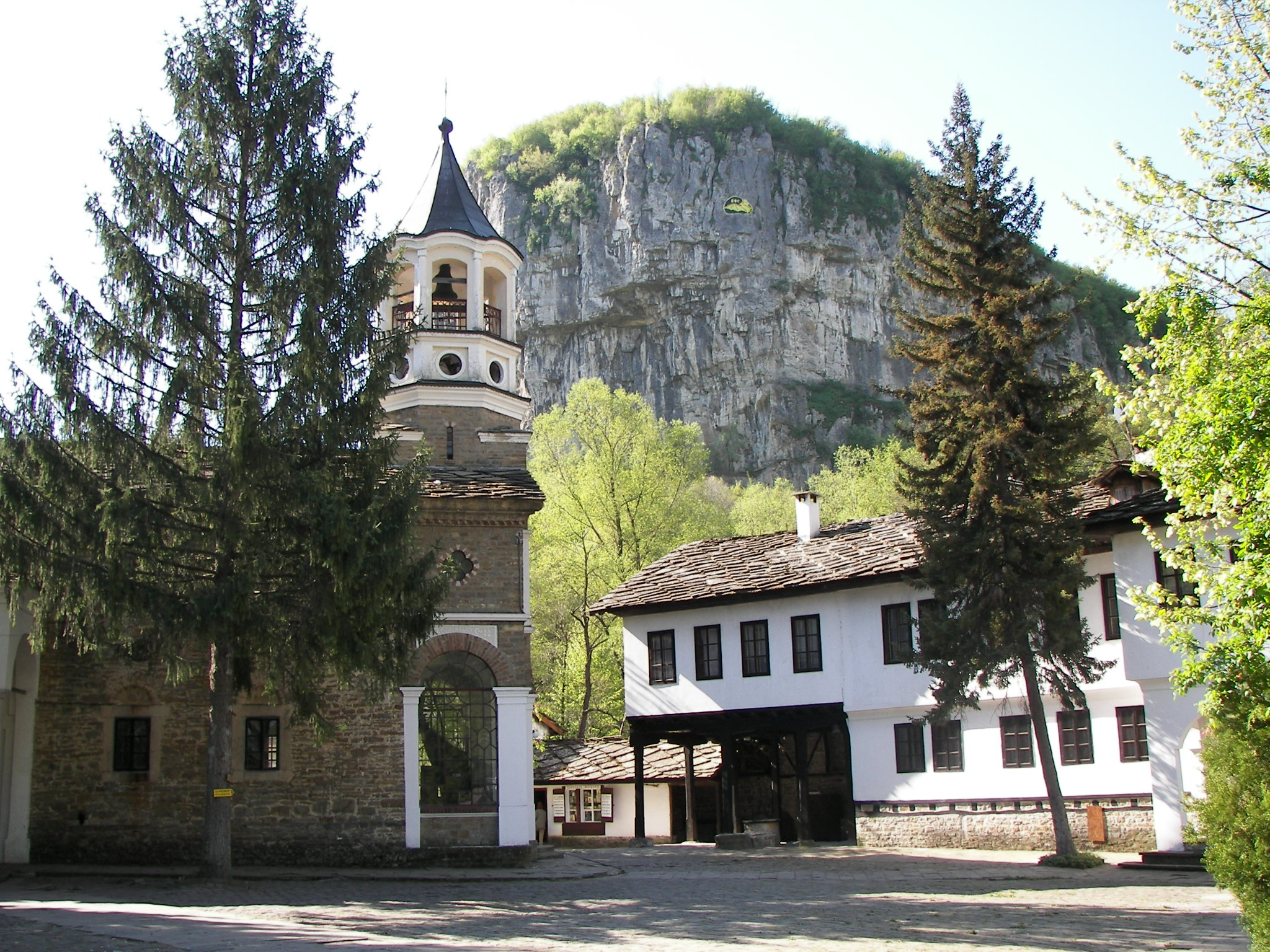

- Location within Bulgaria
- Interactive map of Dryanovo Monastery

Monastery information
- Order: Bulgarian Orthodox
- Established: 12th century
- Dedication: Archangel Michael

Site
- Location: Andaka River Valley, Bulgarka Nature Park, Bulgaria
- Coordinates: 42°57′3″N 25°25′55″E

The Dryanovo Monastery (Bulgarian: Дряновски манастир, Dryanovski manastir, [ˈdrʲanofski mɐnɐsˈtir]) is a functioning Bulgarian Orthodox monastery situated in the Andaka River Valley, in Bulgarka Nature Park in the central part of Bulgaria five kilometers away from the town of Dryanovo. It was founded in the 12th century, during the Second Bulgarian Empire, and is dedicated to Archangel Michael. Twice burnt down and pillaged during the Ottoman rule of Bulgaria, the monastery was restored at it present place in 1845. It was the site of several battles during the April Uprising of 1876.

== Gallery ==
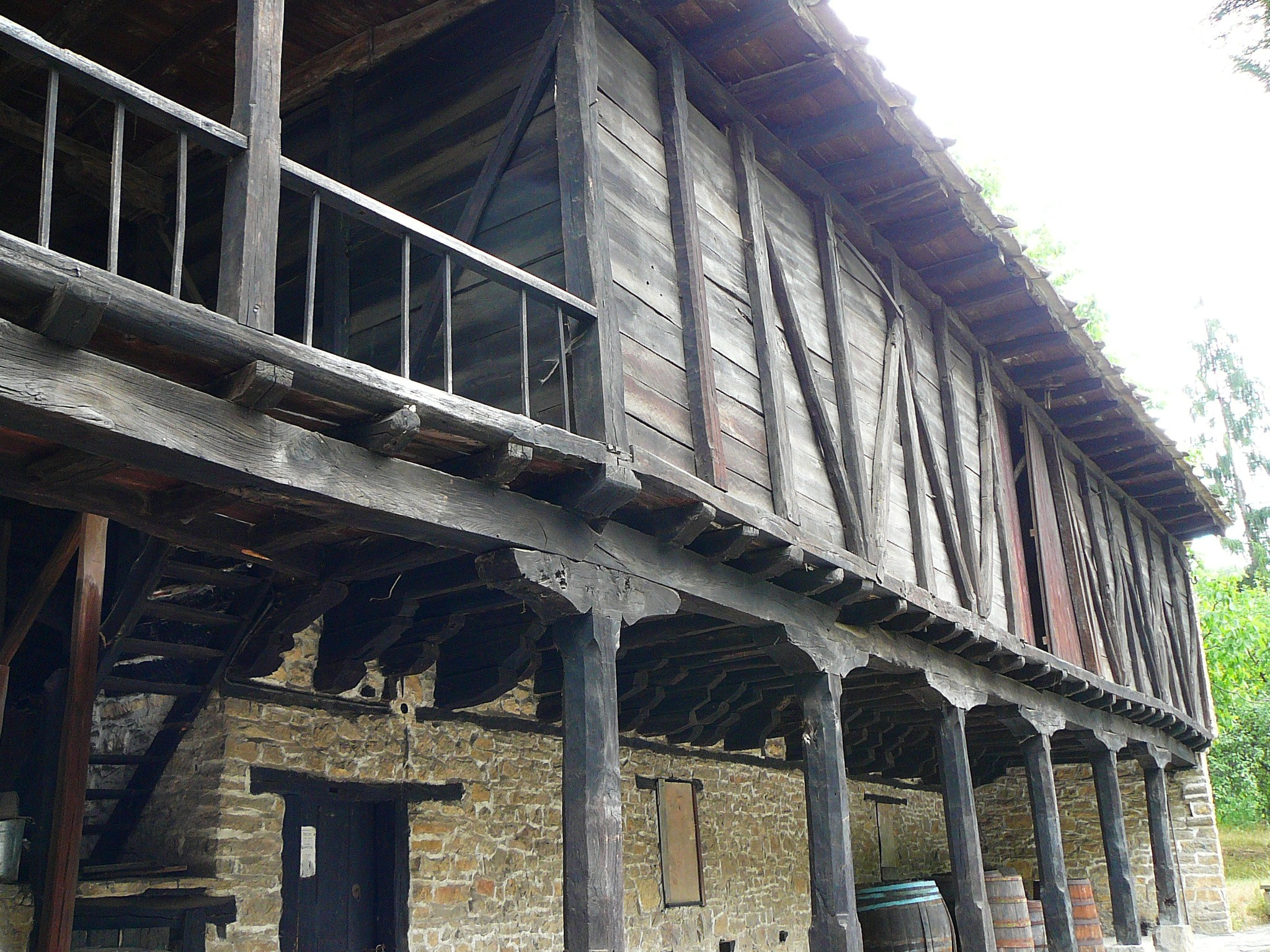
Residential building

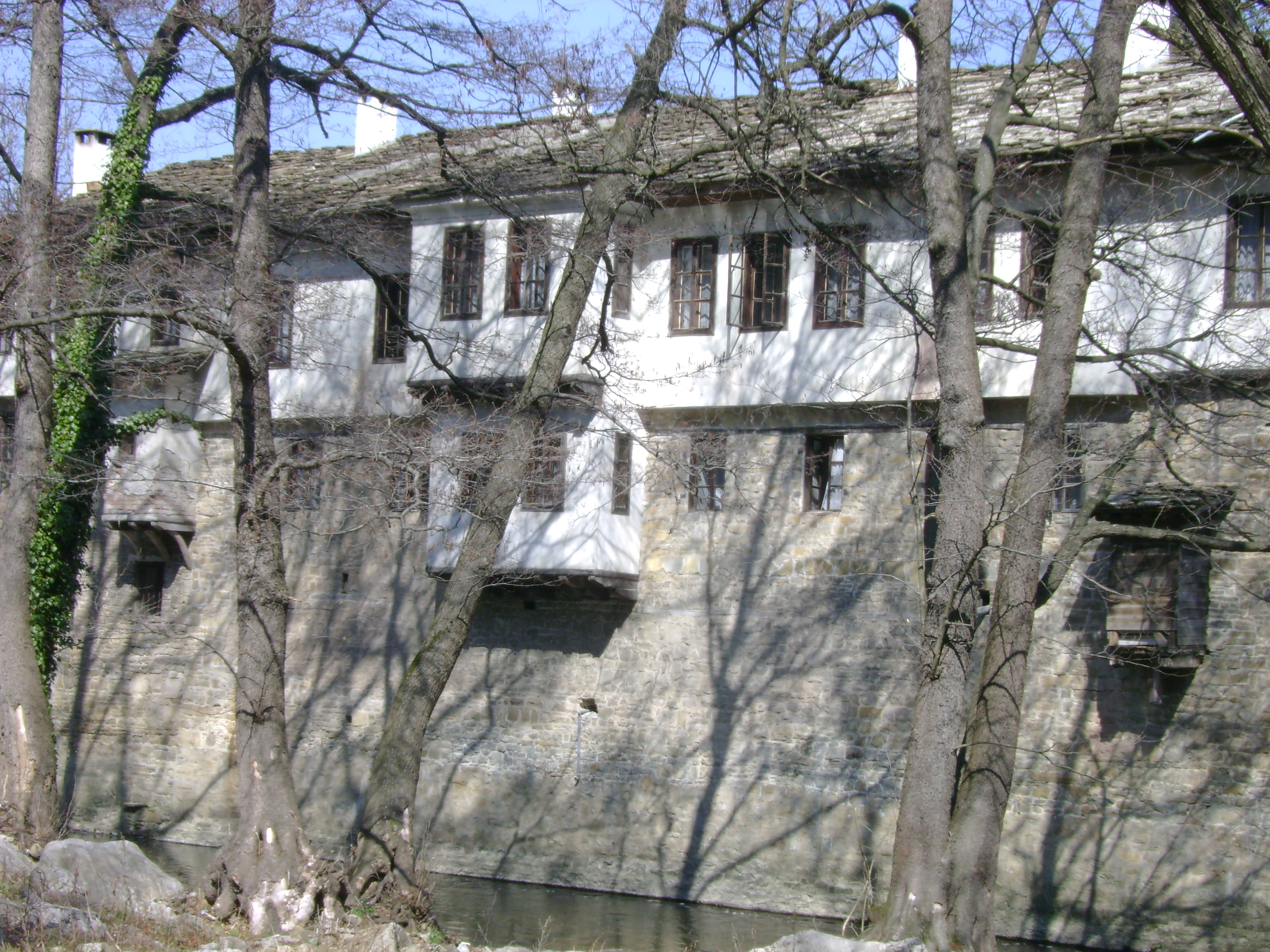
Residential building

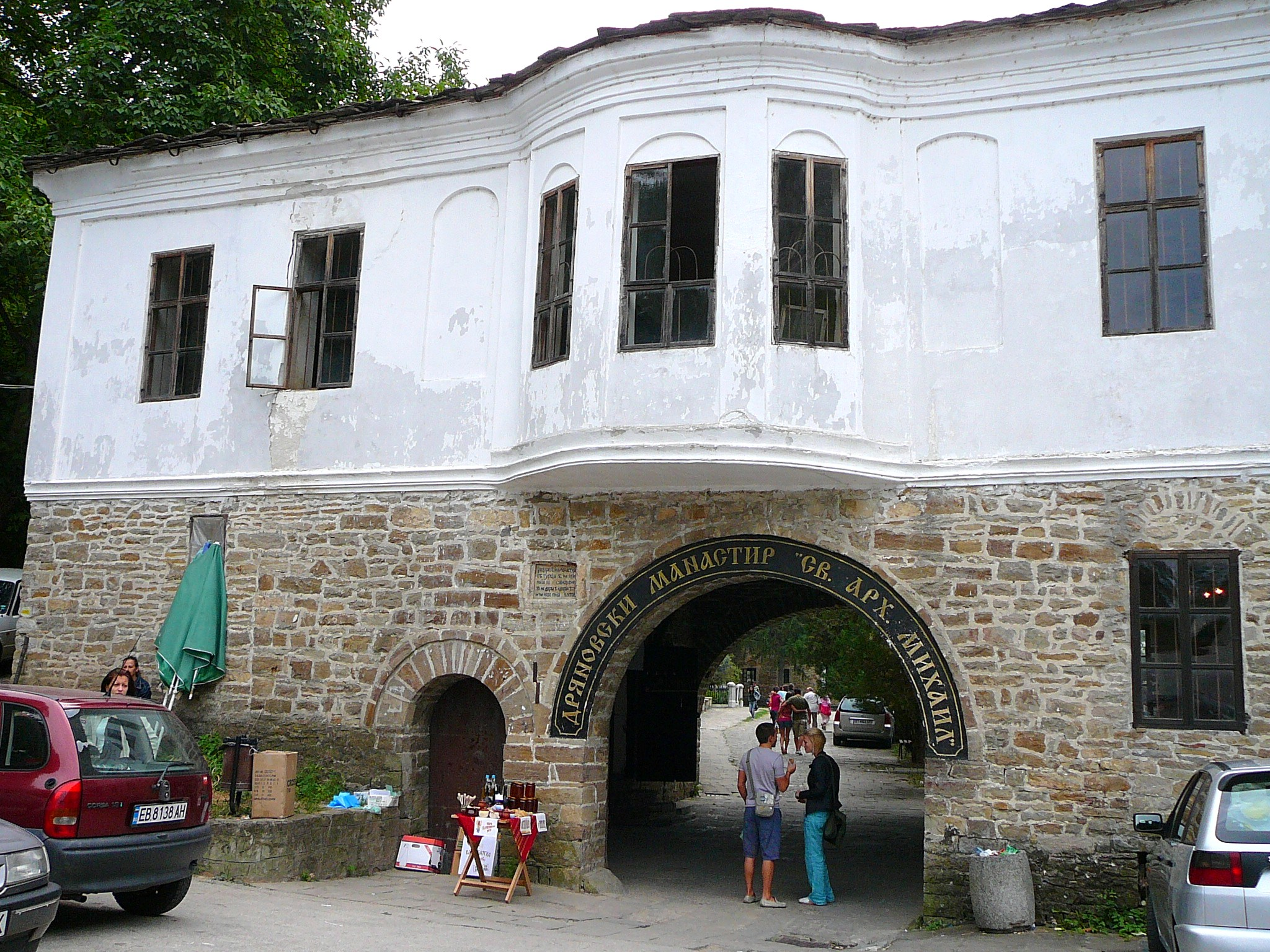
Entrance

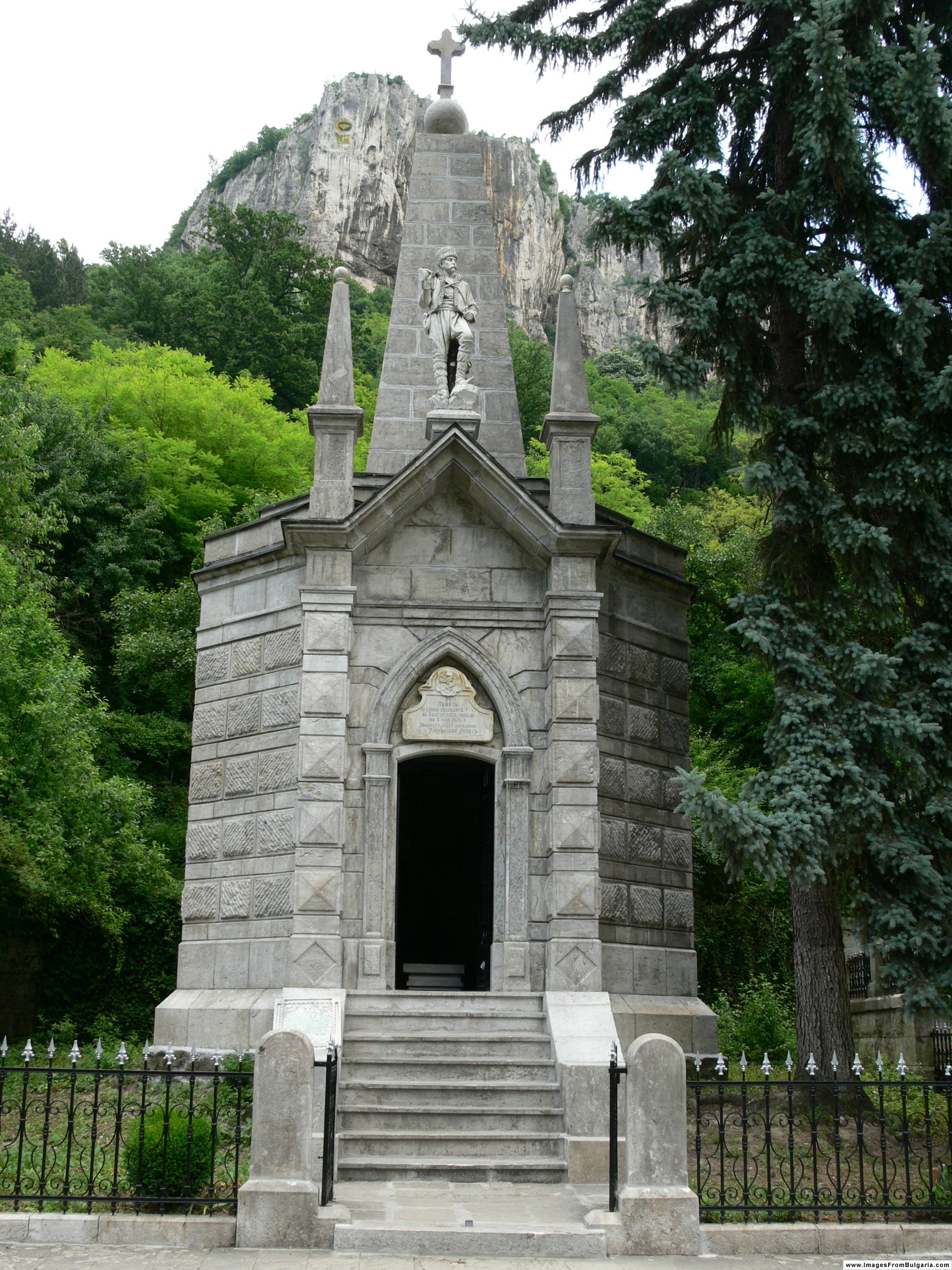
Monument to the April Uprising by Arnoldo Zocchi

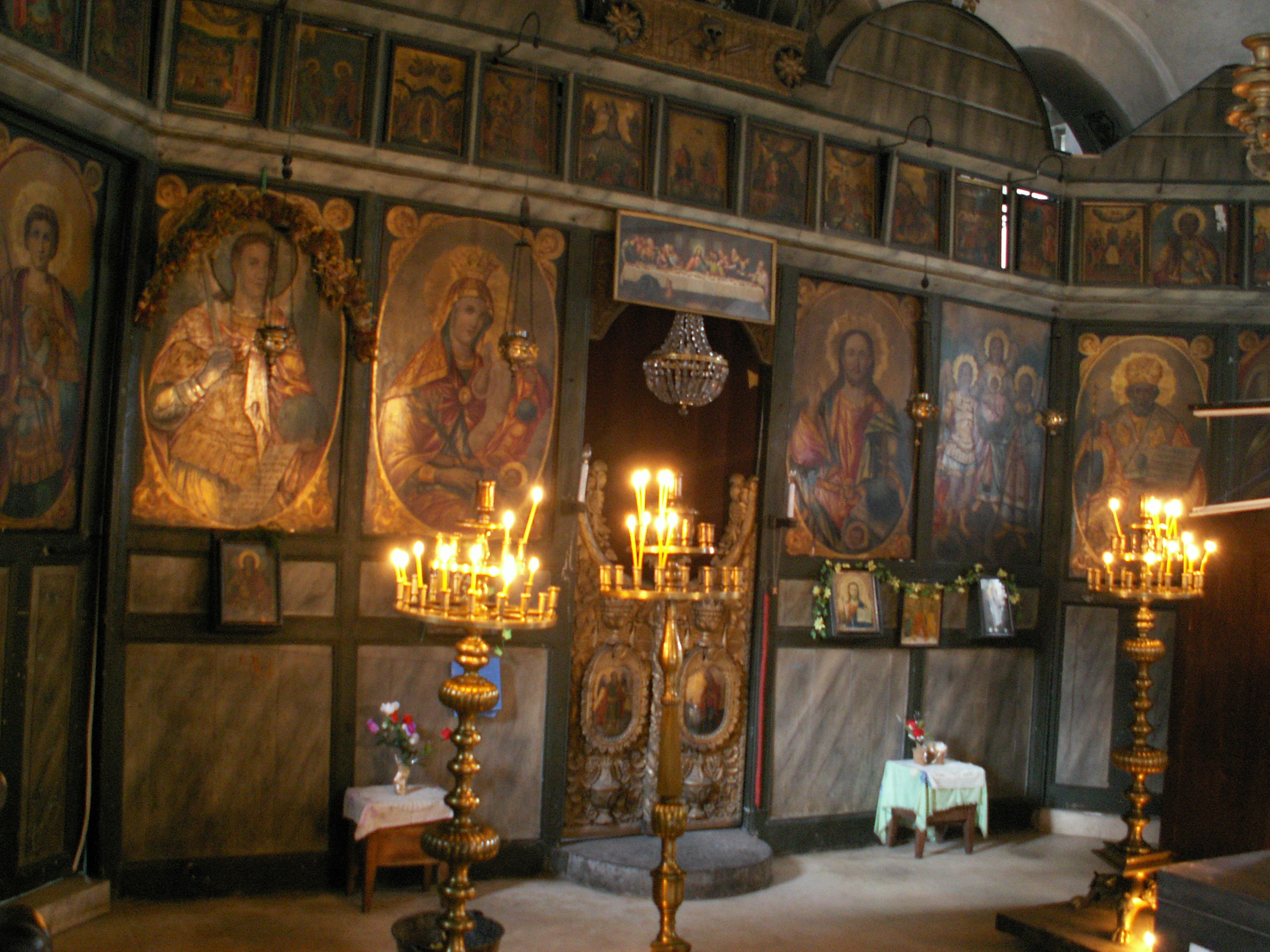
Church interior

== See also ==
- Bacho Kiro cave
- Battle of Shipka Pass
- Bulgarian Orthodox Church
- Bulgarka Nature Park
- Etar Architectural-Ethnographic Complex
- Gabrovo
- Shipka Pass
- Sokolski Monastery
- Tryavna
- Uzana
