= Marko Ganchev =

Bulgarian writer and politician

Marko Ganchev Marinov
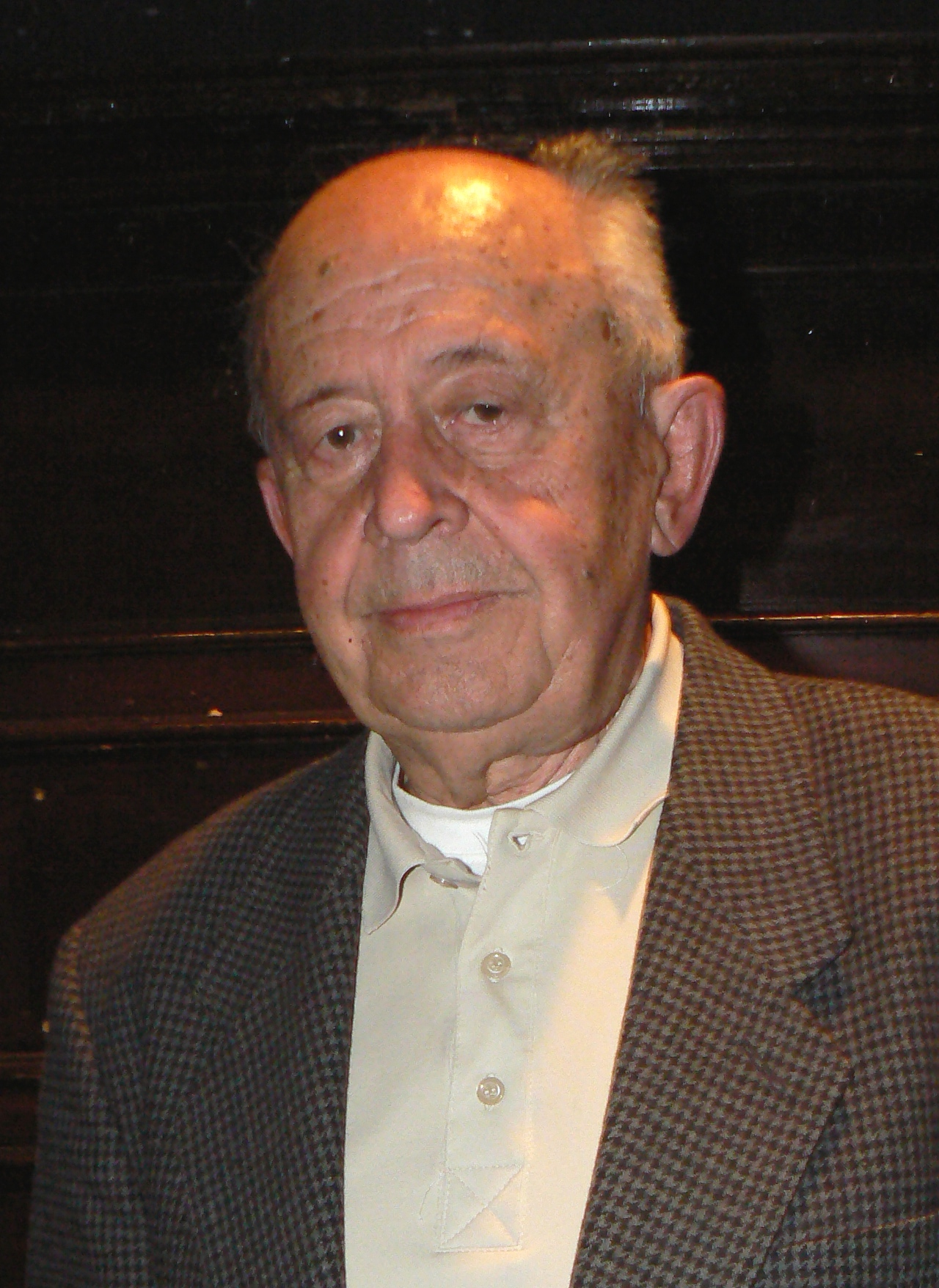
- Born: February 13, 1932 (age 94); Dryanovo, Bulgaria
- Occupation: Writer

Marko Ganchev Marinov is a Bulgarian writer, satirist, essayist, author of children's literature and public figure.

== Biography ==
Marko Ganchev was born in 1932 in the village of Marcha, which today is a neighborhood in the town of Dryanovo.

His first poem was published in 1942 in the capital's children's newspaper "Drugarche" by KP Domuschiev. In 1946 he began to collaborate regularly with poems in the high school newspapers "Srednoshkolsko Edinstvo" and "EMOS", both published in Sofia. In 1950 he graduated from high school in Dryanovo and was accepted as a student of Bulgarian philology at Sofia University. As a student in 1950-1955 he published poetry in the newspapers "Narodna Mladezh", "Literary Front", "Starling" and in literary magazines and anthologies. After graduating in Bulgarian philology he was sent by the Union of Bulgarian Writers to Tirana, Albania, to prepare for a translation of poetry from Albanian.

Marko Ganchev's first collection of poems, "The Seeds Ripen", was published in 1957.

From 1961 to 1968 he headed the cultural department and was a member of the editorial board of the Starling newspaper. From 1968 he was the head of the Poetry editorial board at the Narodna Kultura publishing house, until 1971, when he was expelled from the Bulgarian Communist Party for refusing to vote on a resolution against Alexander Solzhenitsyn. He continued to work in the department as a regular editor, and from 1979 to 1984 he was an editor in the magazine "Contemporary".

From 1984 to 1989 he was the editor-in-chief of the almanac for humor and satire "Apropo", published by the House of Humor and Satire in Gabrovo. In 1989, he began running a column twice a week on Radio Free Europe, in which he read political essays under the general title "Farewell to the Totalitarian System." From December 1989 to 1993 he was the editor-in-chief of the Literary Front newspaper, which in the meantime was renamed the Literary Forum.

Ganchev was a member of the Union of Democratic Forces in the 7th Grand National Assembly, he signed the new constitution and was then expelled from the UDF. From 1993 to 1999 he was the Ambassador of the Republic of Bulgaria to the Republic of Belarus, after which he became a freelance writer.

== Awards ==
- 2001: National Literary Award "P. R. Slaveykov", awarded to him by the Ministry of Education and Science for his overall work for children and adolescents.
- 2002: Order "Stara Planina" 1st degree for outstanding contribution to Bulgarian culture.
- 2003: National Literary Award for Humor and Satire "Rayko Alexiev", awarded by the Municipality of Pazardzhik for overall literary creativity and contribution to the field of humor and satire.
- 2008: National Award "Konstantin Konstantinov" for overall contribution to children's book publishing.
- 2021: April Prize for Comprehensive Creativity.

== Bibliography ==
=== Lyrics ===
- The seeds ripen, 1957
- All Roads and One, 1965
- The Right to Be Awake, 1966
- Running Tree, 1969
- Sunday Happiness, 1971
- Silent Sirens, 1977
- Great family, 1987

=== Satire ===
- Martian Enthusiasm, 1960
- Second Coming, 1964
- Your own man, bibl. Hornet No. 100, 1965
- Fixing the World, 1967
- Rearview Mirror, 1975 and 1978
- Scratches, 1979 and 1984
- Epigrams, 1979
- Profession Disagreement, 1982
- Veterans of Nothing, 1985
- Nothing Funny, 1988
- Short circuits, 1989
- Barking on the Caravan, 2006
- King and Cattleman, 2010
- In Search of the Lost Tribe, 2012;

=== For children ===
- The Terrible Gloom, poems, 1971
- What to Do, Poems and Tales, 1973
- Farewell to the Goblins, Tales, 1974
- The Crocodile's Younger Brother, Tales, 1976
- Pouch with popcorn, poems, 1977
- Book with binoculars, poems, 1978
- Spherical Lightning, Tales, 1980
- Big and small, poems, 1980
- Punch songs, poems, 1983
- Do You Have a Tickle, Tales, 1984;
- The Lost Tower, poems, 1984
- Bag for Tomorrow, poems, 1987
- The Ghost Heide Holan, poems, 1990
- Donkey works, poems, 2004
- The white dove, poems

=== Essays ===
- Forgiveness and the Curse of Deception, 1990
- The Triumphal Arches to Literature, 1998
- Laluger of the two systems, 1998

=== Selected ===
- Lyrics, 1979
- Selected Satires, 1982
- Funny Sadness, 2002
