= Aleksandar Hadzhihristov =

Alexander Ivanov Hadzhihristov (1913-1975) (Bulgarian: Александър Иванов Хаджихристов) was a Bulgarian playwright, writer and theatrical figure.

== Biography ==
Hadzhihristov was born in 1913 in Sofia. For 40 years he worked as a journalist at the Den newspaper with editor-in-chief Slavcho Vasev. After the death of playwright Nikolay Liliev in 1960, he became chief playwright at the Ivan Vazov National Theatre. In the following years wrote numerous children's plays such as Zhorko — Commander, A Tale of Tales, and Mermaid. He also wrote a scenario for the crime movie Night of 13th featuring Apostol Karamitev.

Hadzhihristov is the author of the play Page From the Past (Chronicle of Samuel), in which Andrey Chaprazov featured as Samuel in 50 performances on stage at the National Theatre before handing the role to Lyubomir Kiselichki. Hadzhihristov was also a long-time director of the Varna, Gabrovo and Tarnovo theatres. He has also written essays and poems, such as those of the battle march of the Bulgarian First Army.

He died in Stara Zagora in 1975.
