= Toshev =

Toshev (Bulgarian: Тошев), female form Tosheva (Bulgarian: Тошева), is a Bulgarian surname.

Notable people with this surname include:

- Andrey Toshev (1867–1944), Bulgarian prime minister
- Angela Tosheva (born 1961), Bulgarian musician
- Martin Toshev (born 1990), Bulgarian footballer
- Ognyan Toshev (born 1940), Bulgarian cyclist
- Pere Toshev (1865–1912), Bulgarian revolutionary
- Slavcho Toshev (born 1980), Bulgarian footballer
- Stefan Toshev (1859–1924), Bulgarian general
- Yury Toshev (1907–1974), Bulgarian chess master

== See also ==
- General Toshevo, Bulgarian town named after Stefan Toshev
