= Georgi Dimitrov-Goshkin =

Bulgarian Writer, Publicist and Politician

Georgi Dimitrov
- Born: 21 September 1912
- Died: 3 January 2007 (aged 94); Sofia, Bulgaria
- Other name: Goshkin
- Occupations: Publicist, Writer, Politician.

Georgi Dimitrov, under the pseudonym Goshkin, was a Bulgarian publicist, writer and politician who was a member of the Bulgarian Communist Party.

== Biography ==
He was born on 21 September 1912. Between 1964 and 1966 he was editor-in-chief of the Literary Front newspaper. From 1966 to 1971 he was a candidate member of the Central Committee of the Bulgarian Communist Party, and from 1971 to 1990 he was again a member of the Central Committee. He was chairman of the Committee for Friendship and Cultural Relations Abroad. He died on 3 January 2007 in Sofia.

The writer Georgi Markov wrote of him: "Goshkin was the man whose dogmatism had become a household word. Despite his bold demeanor, his beliefs, and especially their form, made him the ideal cultist. He reduced everything to some clear philosophical formulations, and there seemed to be nothing in the world that could surprise him .... But as editor-in-chief, Goshkin had one great advantage - he never hid behind higher authorities, never he did not flirt, he did not blur, but he was honest even in the most unpleasant situations. At the same time, he was vain and loved gestures."

== Bibliography ==
- Unity and Discussions, ed. "Bulgarian Writer", 1958
- Problems of artistic specificity, ed. "Bulgarian Writer", 1961
- Questions of Philosophy, Aesthetics, Criticism, ed. "Bulgarian Writer", 1962
- Logic is needed, ed. Science and Art, 1973
- Peace does not come for free, ed. of OF, 1978
