= Dryanovo =

Dryanovo Дряново
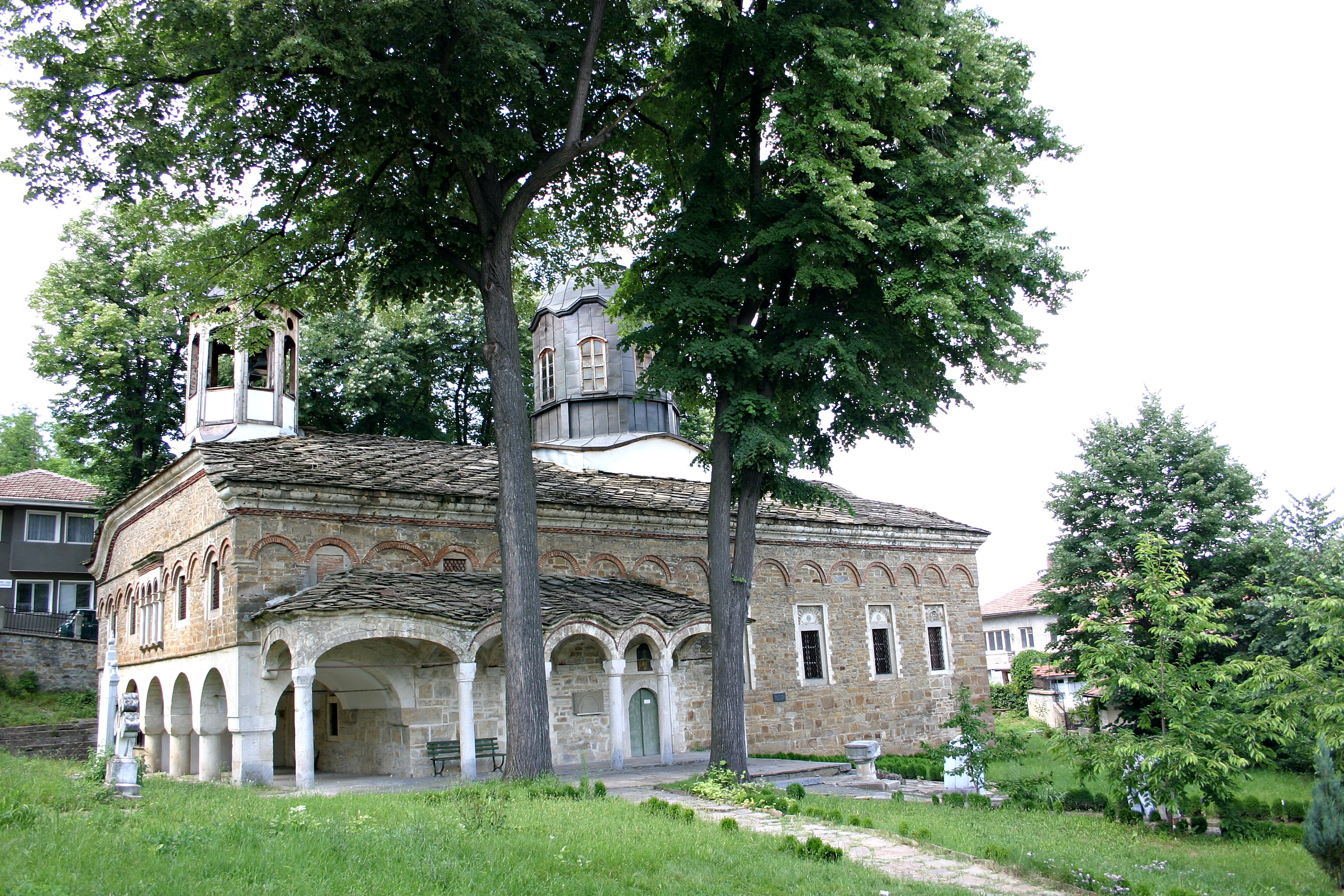
- The 19th century church in Dryanovo designed by Kolyu Ficheto

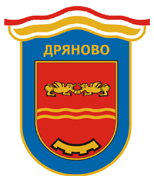
- Coat of arms

- Location of Dryanovo in Bulgaria
- Coordinates: 42°59′00″N 25°29′31″E
- Country: Bulgaria
- Province (Oblast): Gabrovo

Government
  - Mayor: Trifon Panchev (Трифон Панчев) (BSP)
- Elevation: 230 m (750 ft)

Population (15-3-2015)
  - Total: 7,968
- Time zone: UTC+2 (EET)
  - Summer (DST): UTC+3 (EEST)
- Postal Code: 5370
- Area code: (+359) 0676
- Website: Official website

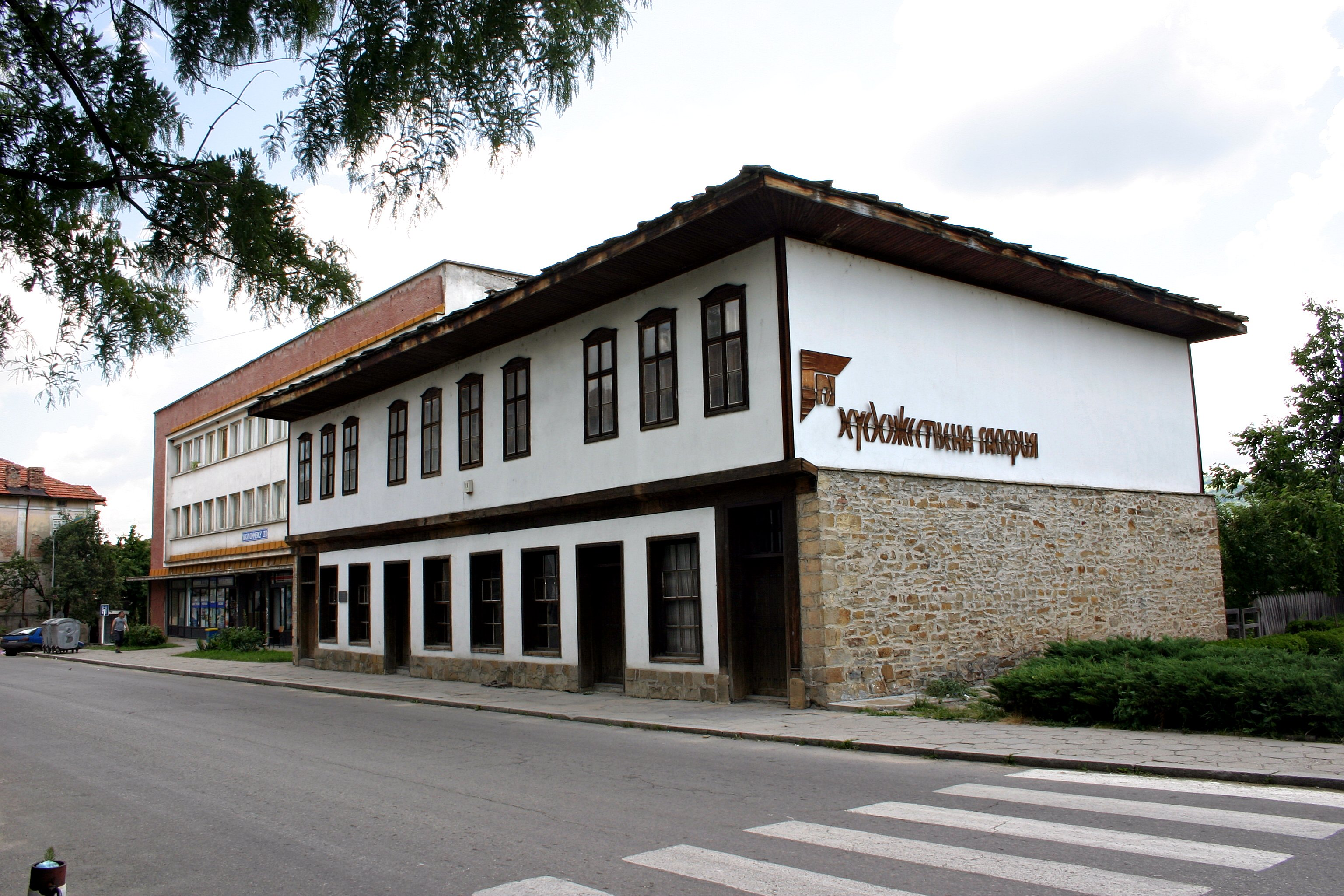
The Dryanovo art gallery building, another work of Kolyu Ficheto

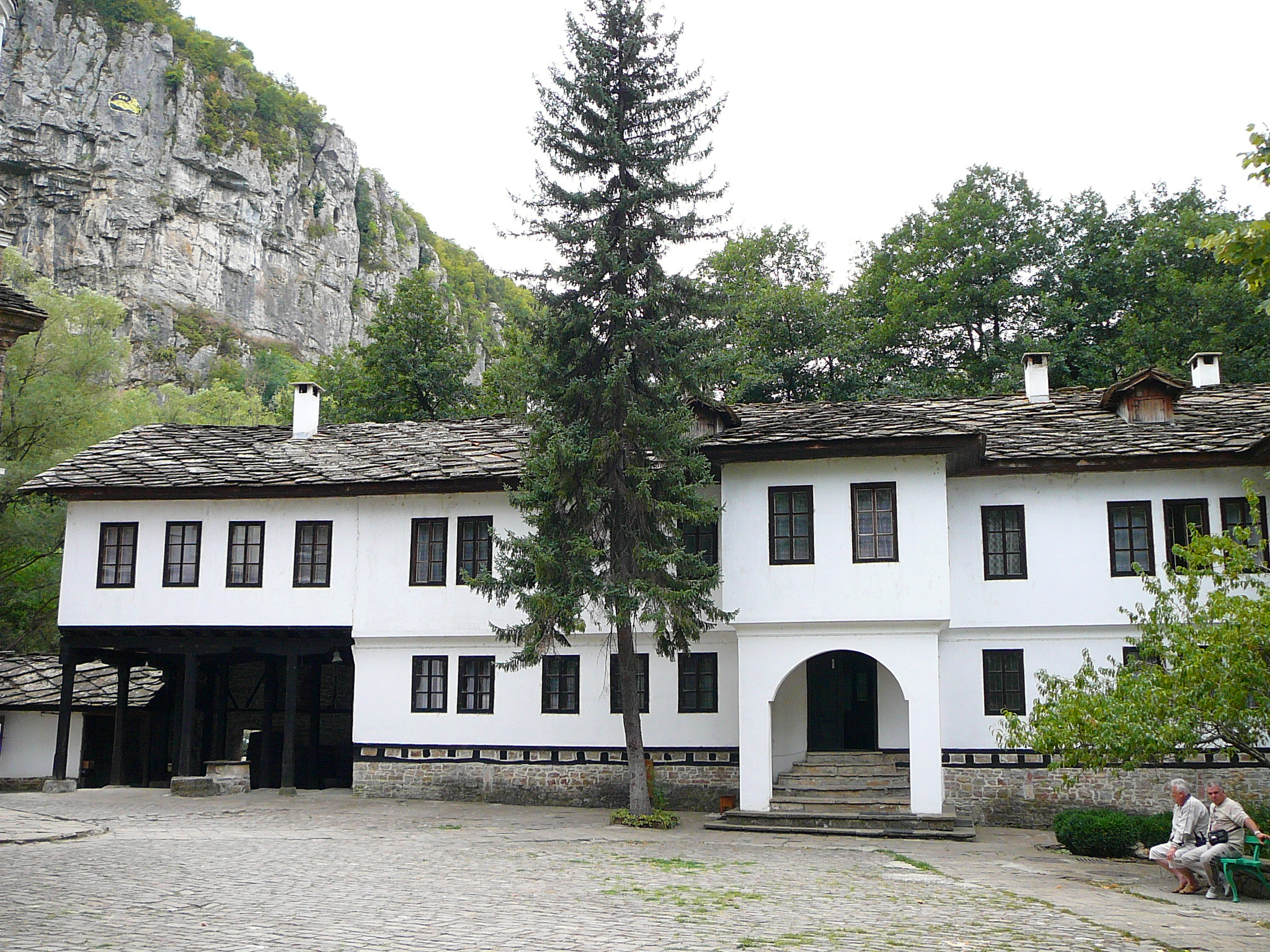
Dryanovo Monastery

Dryanovo (Bulgarian: Дряново, [ˈdrʲanovo]) is a Bulgarian town situated at the northern foot of the Balkan Mountains in Gabrovo Province; amphitheatrically along the two banks of Dryanovo River, a tributary to the Yantra River. The town is a centre of the homonymous Dryanovo Municipality, which is composed of 62 villages, hamlets and huts picturesquely spread out of the mountain folds. As of 2015, it had a population of 7,968. In 2009, it was 8,043.

== Geography ==
Dryanovo has a favourable geographical position, being situated 20 km away from Gabrovo, 24 km from Veliko Tarnovo, 17 km from Tryavna and about 30 km away from Sevlievo. The town lies on the Rousse-Veliko Tarnovo-Gabrovo-Shipka-Kazanlak-Stara Zagora highway and it is a station of the main railway thoroughfare, which links the north and the south part of Bulgaria.

== History ==
Like all Balkan mountain settlements, Dryanovo reached its bloom at the time of the Bulgarian National Revival. In 1883 it was proclaimed a town. Masons and woodcarvers spread the fame of the town throughout Bulgaria and far away in the Ottoman Empire.

The oldest traces of life on Balkan Peninsula were discovered in the area, proofs of human presence from the Paleolithic were discovered in Bacho Kiro cave near Dryanovo monastery, situated in the Andaka river valley. Numerous relics of ancient villages, fortresses, pillars with inscriptions and ornaments from Thracian and Roman times (Boruna and Diskoduratera fortresses) were discovered there.

Dryanovo is sometimes referred to as "a town of centenarians" for the healthy climatic conditions prolonging people's life. The town is also known as the birthplace of the renowned architect Kolyu Ficheto.

== Honours ==
Dryanovo Heights on Greenwich Island in the South Shetland Islands, Antarctica is named after Dryanovo.

== International relations ==
=== Twin towns — Sister cities ===
Dryanovo is twinned with:

- Bykhaw, Belarus
- Itamos, Greece
- Kavarna, Bulgaria
- Borgia, Italy
- Rocca Imperiale, Italy
- Bocholt, Belgium
- Radoviš, North Macedonia
- Ma'ale Adumim, Israeli settlement in the West Bank

== See also ==
- Dryanovo monastery
- Sokolsky monastery
- City of Gabrovo
- Gabrovo jokes
- Etar Architectural-Ethnographic Complex
- Village of Bozhentsi
- Winter Resort Uzana
- FC Lokomotiv Dryanovo
