= Literary Front =

Bulgarian weekly newspaper

The Literary Front
- Type: Weekly newspaper
- Owner: Union of Bulgarian Writers
- Publisher: Union of Bulgarian Writers
- Founded: 1945
- Ceased publication: 1993
- Headquarters: Angel Kanchev Street № 5
- Country: Bulgaria

The Literary Front was a Bulgarian weekly newspaper for literature, literary criticism and art. It was published by the Union of Bulgarian Writers from 1945 to 1993, when it was renamed the Literary Forum.

== Editors ==
The editors-in-chief of the Literary Front were:

- Nikola Furnadzhiev (1945–1949)
- Veselin Andreev (1949–1955)
- Slavcho Vasev (1955–1964)
- Georgi Dimitrov-Goshkin (1964–1966)
- Bogomil Raynov (1966–1970)
- Lubomir Levchev (1970–1973)
- Efrem Karanfilov (1973–1980)
- Nikola Indjov (1980–1983)
- Rusi Bozhanov (1983–1984)
- Evtim Evtimov (1984–1988)
- Lilyana Stefanova (1988–1989)
- Marko Ganchev (1989–1993)
