= Veselin Andreev =

Bulgarian poet, publicist and functionary of the Bulgarian Communist Party

Vesselin Andreev
- Веселин Андреев
- Born: Georgi Georgiev Andreev; February 16, 1918; Pirdop, Kingdom of Bulgaria
- Died: February 11, 1991 (aged 72); Sofia, Bulgaria
- Other name: Andro
- Education: Sofia University
- Occupations: Poet, Journalist, Soldier, Writer, Politician.
- Known for: "Ballad of the Communist"
- Awards: Hero of Socialist Labour (Bulgaria), Order of Georgi Dimitrov

Vesselin Andreev (born Georgi Georgiev Andreev) was a participant in the communist guerrilla movement during World War II, a Bulgarian poet, publicist and functionary of the Bulgarian Communist Party (BCP) since 1940. After the September 9 coup he was a member of the Sixth Supreme Soviet. The People's Court (1944-1945), an Honored Worker of Culture (1965) and People's Artist of Art and Culture.

== Biography ==
He was born on February 16, 1918, in the town of Pirdop in the family of a government official. In 1937 he graduated from high school in Sofia and in 1941 he majored in law at Sofia University. At that time he joined the Workers' Youth Union (1934) and the BRP(k) (1940).

Participant in the communist movement during World War II. He had been declared a criminal in 1941, and since 1943 he had been a partisan of the Chavdar Partisan Brigade and a political commissar of the brigade. Around this time he adopted the partisan name 'Andro'.

After the September 9 coup of 1944, Andreev became a judge in the Sixth Supreme Chamber of the so-called People's Court. This was the first and most massive trial against intellectuals, which showed that the Bolshevik government would not allow freedom of thought, speech and press.

At that time he had the rank of major, and held many senior positions in the pro-government press, such as editor-in-chief of the People's Army (1944-1949). He worked for the Literary Front newspaper (1949-1955). He was a member of the Central Committee of the Fighters against Fascism and Capitalism and of the Plenum of the District Committee of the Bulgarian Communist Party in Sofia. From 1986 to 1990 he was a member of the Central Committee of the Bulgarian Communist Party.

In 1947 he published the collection of poems "Partisan Songs", written in the early 40s of the twentieth century. In 1950 - 1954 he was secretary of the Union of Bulgarian Writers. From 1966 until the fall of the communist regime, he was a Member of Parliament.

His last novel, "Zhivkov - Dead in Life" was never finished, but the manuscript was published by his son after his death at the Annals Library of Sofia in 1991.

Vesselin Andreev wrote a farewell letter announcing his departure from the Bulgarian Communist Party and committed suicide on February 11, 1991.

== Selected works ==
- "Partisan Songs" - a collection of poems (1947)
- "In the Lopyanska Forest" - memoirs (1947)
- "There is Moscow in the world" - essay (1951)
- "Guerrilla Stories" (1963)
- "Moments in Egypt" - Travelogue (1963)
- "Vihra - Partisan Stories for Children" (1964)
- "I can't do without you" - essays and memoirs about our writers (1974)
- "The Sonata for Petya Dubarova" (1980)
- "Zhivkov Dead in Life" (1991, posthumously)
