= Etar Architectural-Ethnographic Complex =

Open-air museum in northern Bulgaria

Coordinates: 42°48′34″N 25°20′54″E

The Etar Architectural-Ethnographic Complex (Bulgarian: Етнографски музей на открито „Етър“, usually referred to as Етъра, Etara) is an open-air museum near Gabrovo in northern Bulgaria. It is on the northern edge of the Bulgarka Nature Park, between the park and the city of Gabrovo.

It presents Bulgarian customs, culture and craftsmanship. It spans over an area of 7 ha and contains a total of 50 objects, including water installations and houses with craftsmen's workshops attached. As a whole, the complex's goal is to illustrate the architecture, way of life and economy of Gabrovo and the region during the Bulgarian National Revival.

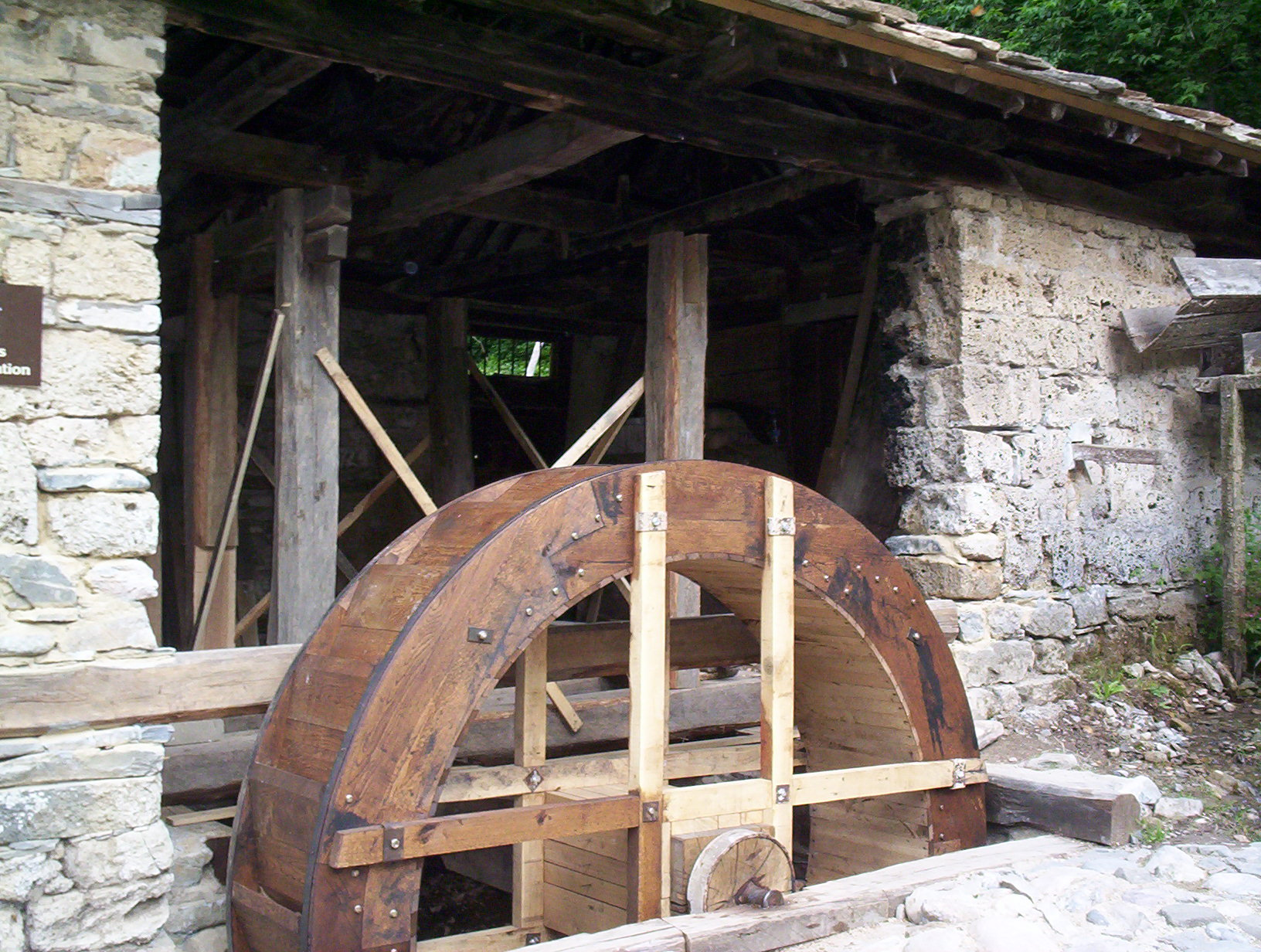
Water mill

The museum's construction started in 1963 under the direction of Lazar Donkov. The pre-existing Karadzheyka water mill, built around 1780, was thoroughly reconstructed, with the other objects being constructed later. The complex was opened on 7 September 1964 and proclaimed a national park in 1967, as well as a monument of culture in 1971.

The park features typical Bulgarian revival houses with two floors, bay windows, a clock tower, and a beautifully decorated house by Saakov featuring 21 windows. Using original instruments and following the old traditions, locals represent around 20 characteristics of the regional crafts such as wood carving, pottery, coppersmith crafts, furriery, cutlery making, needlework, and more. There are shops for souvenirs. There are numerous restaurants in the park that serve local Bulgarian cuisine.

Sokolski Monastery is situated several kilometers away from the museum.

== Gallery ==
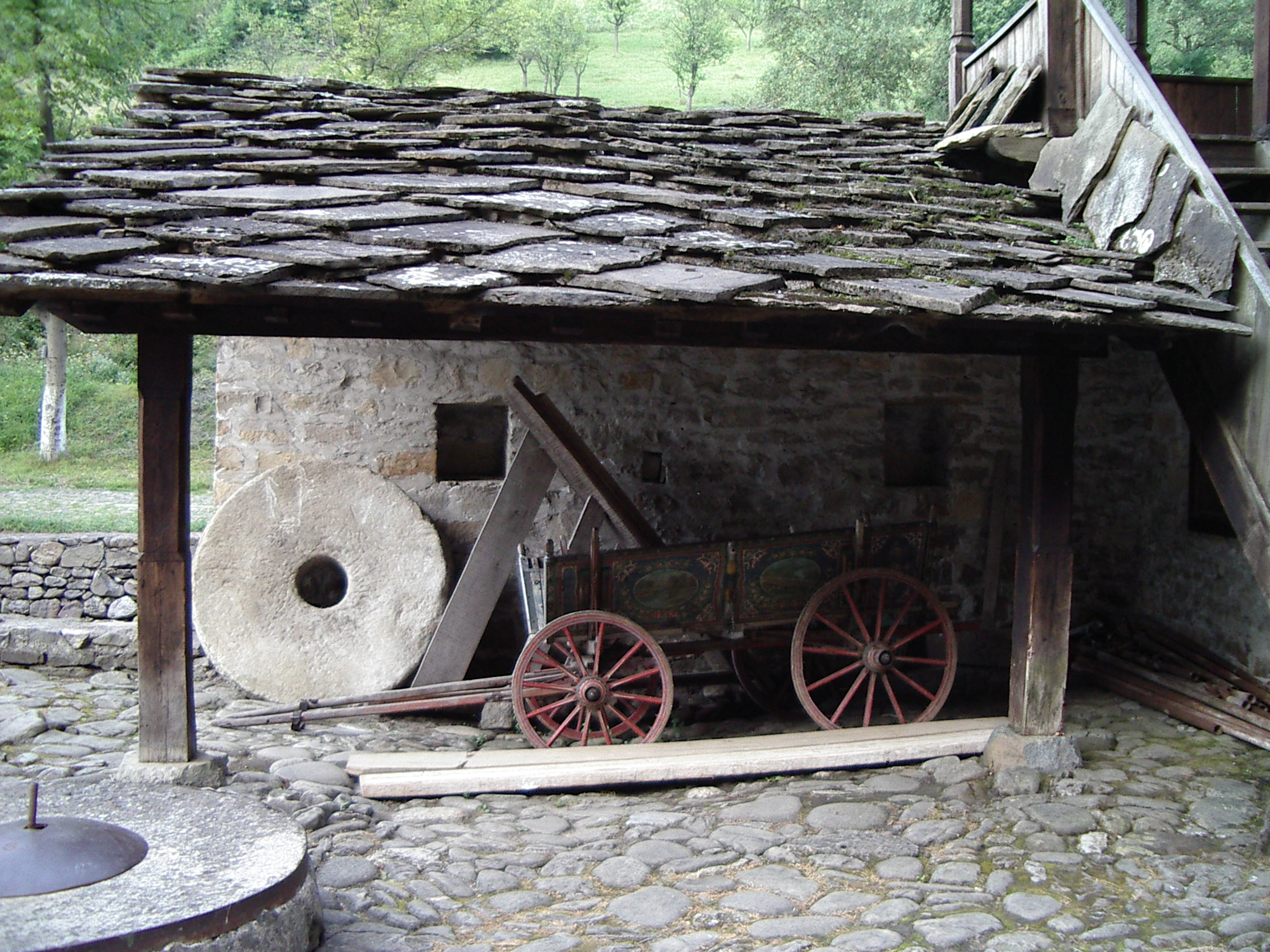

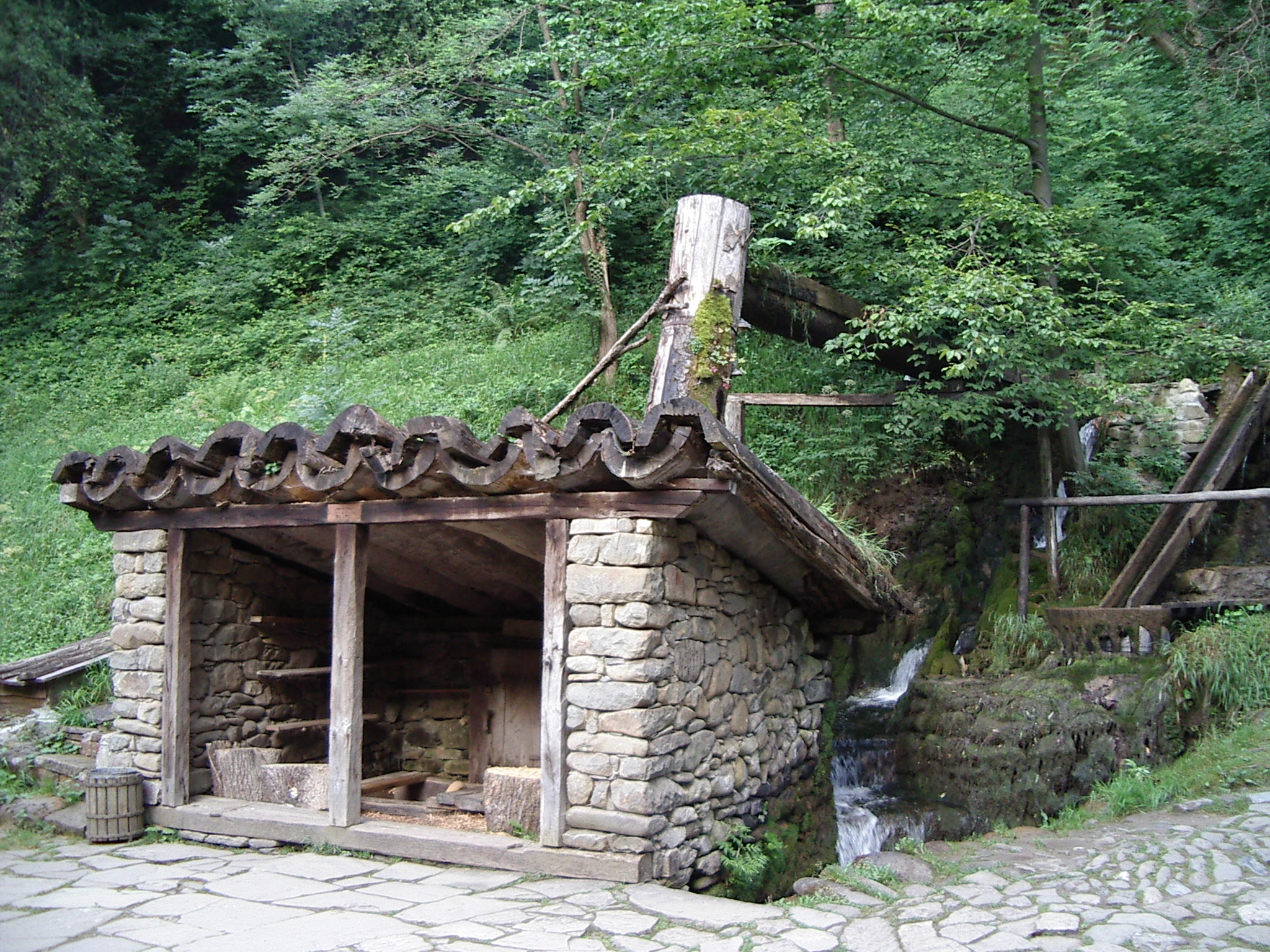

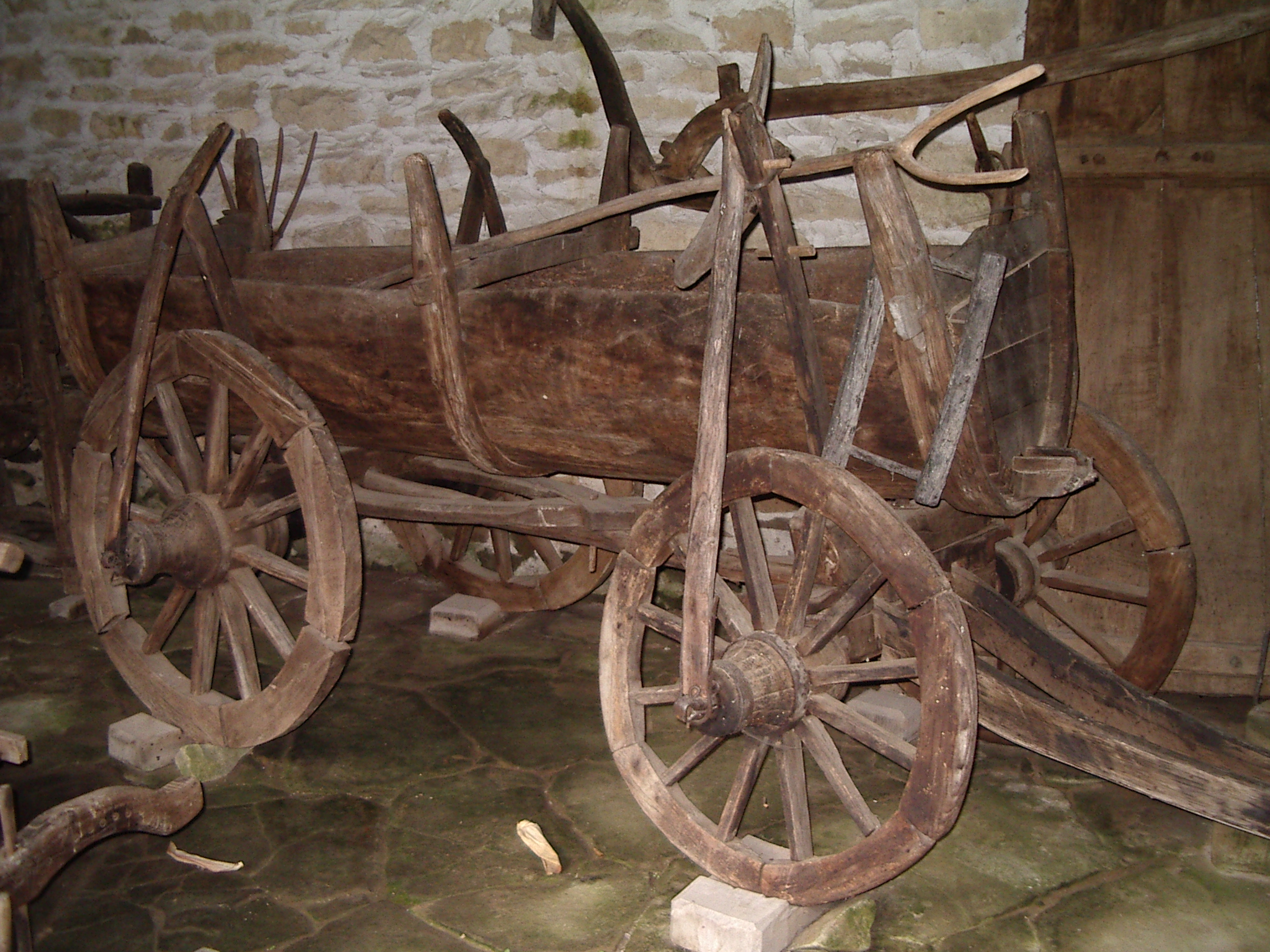

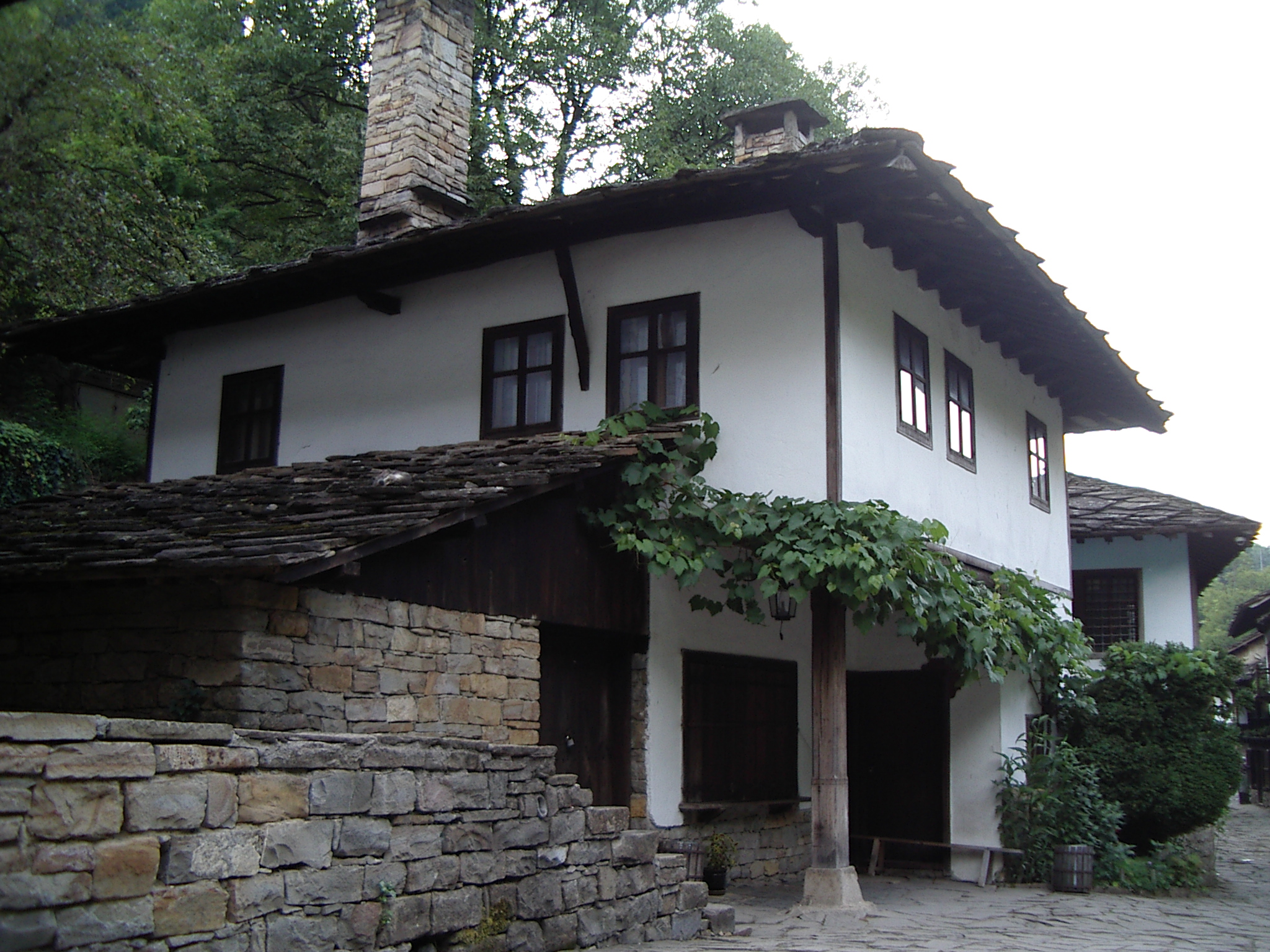

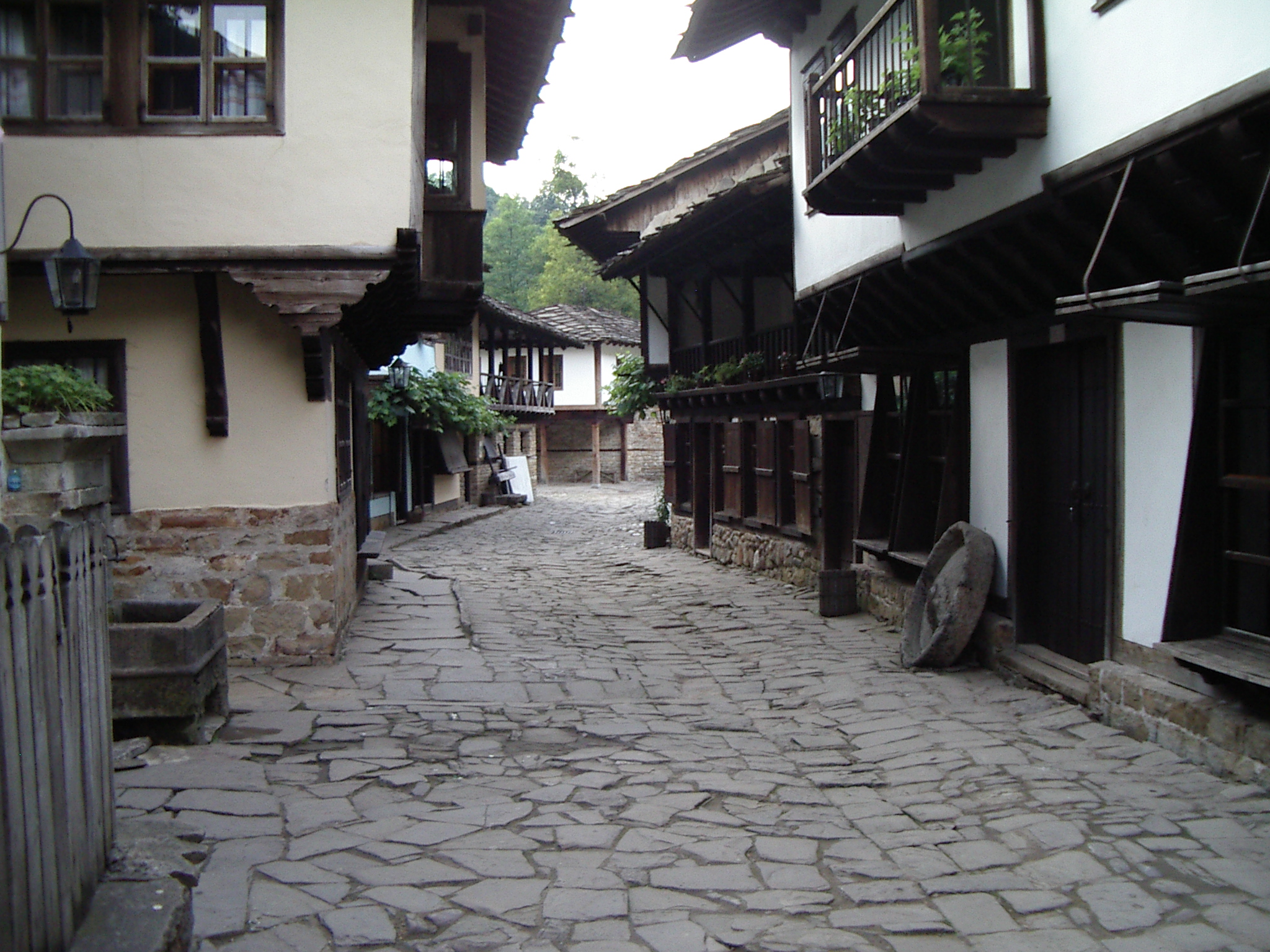

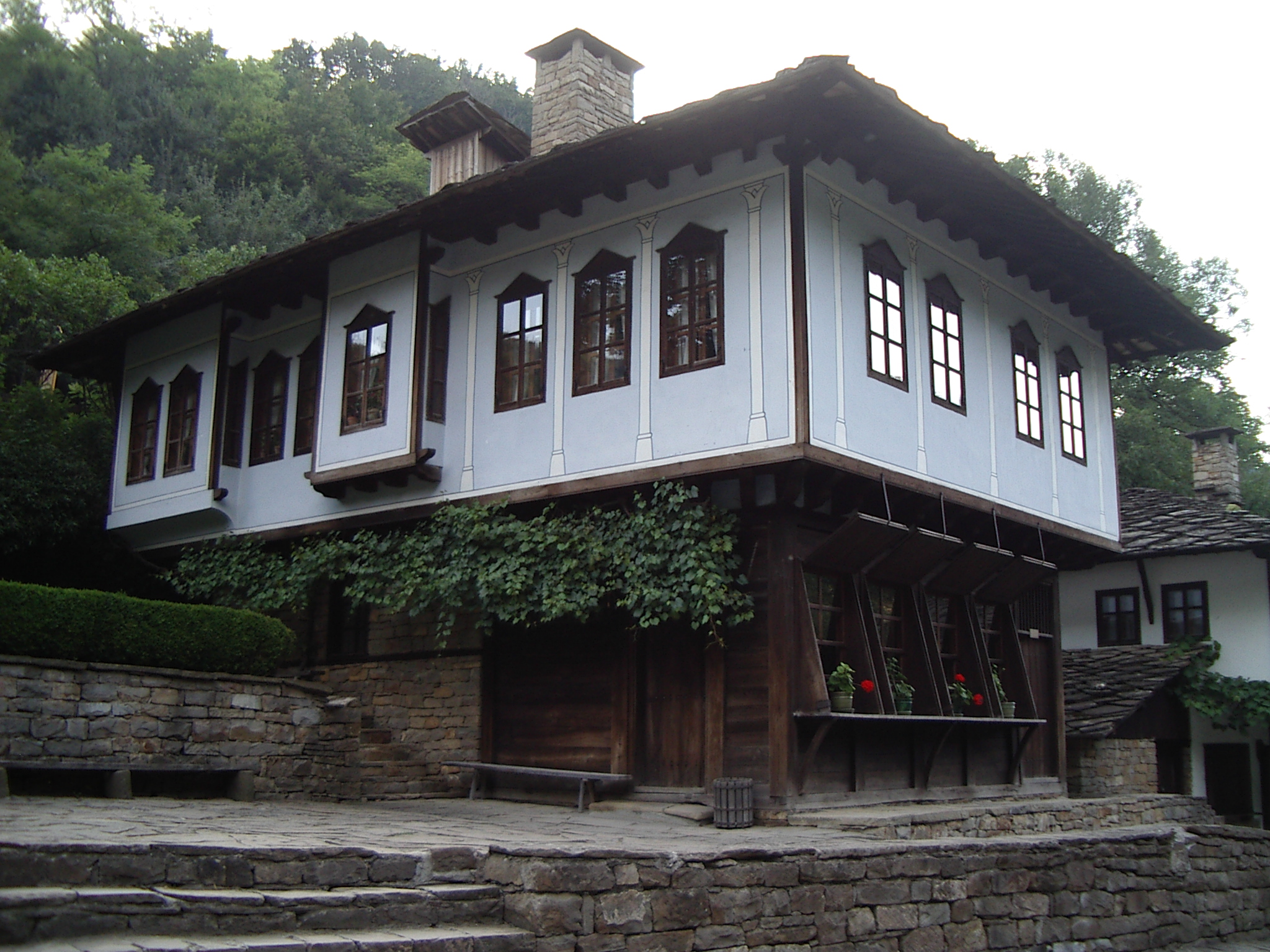

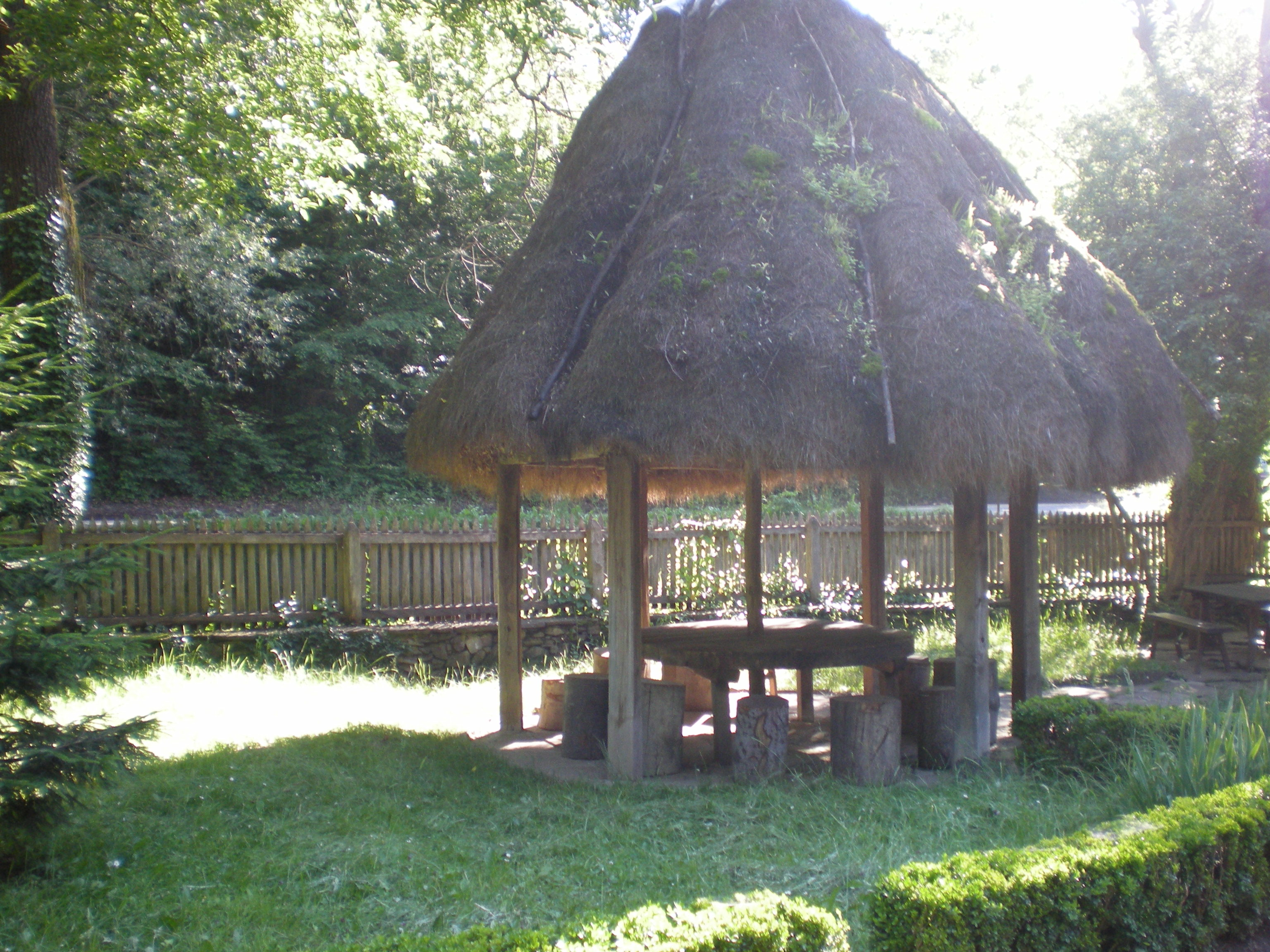

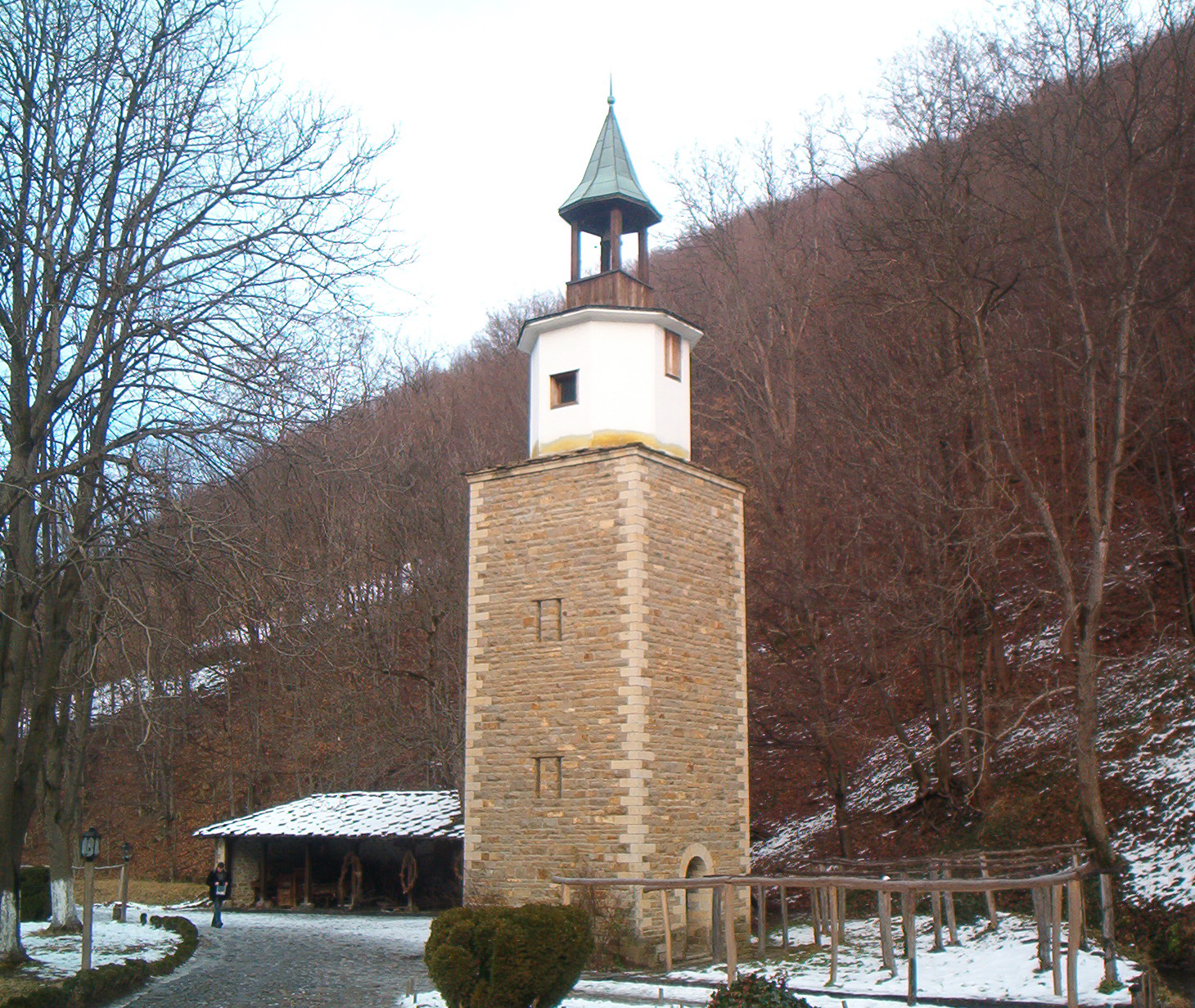

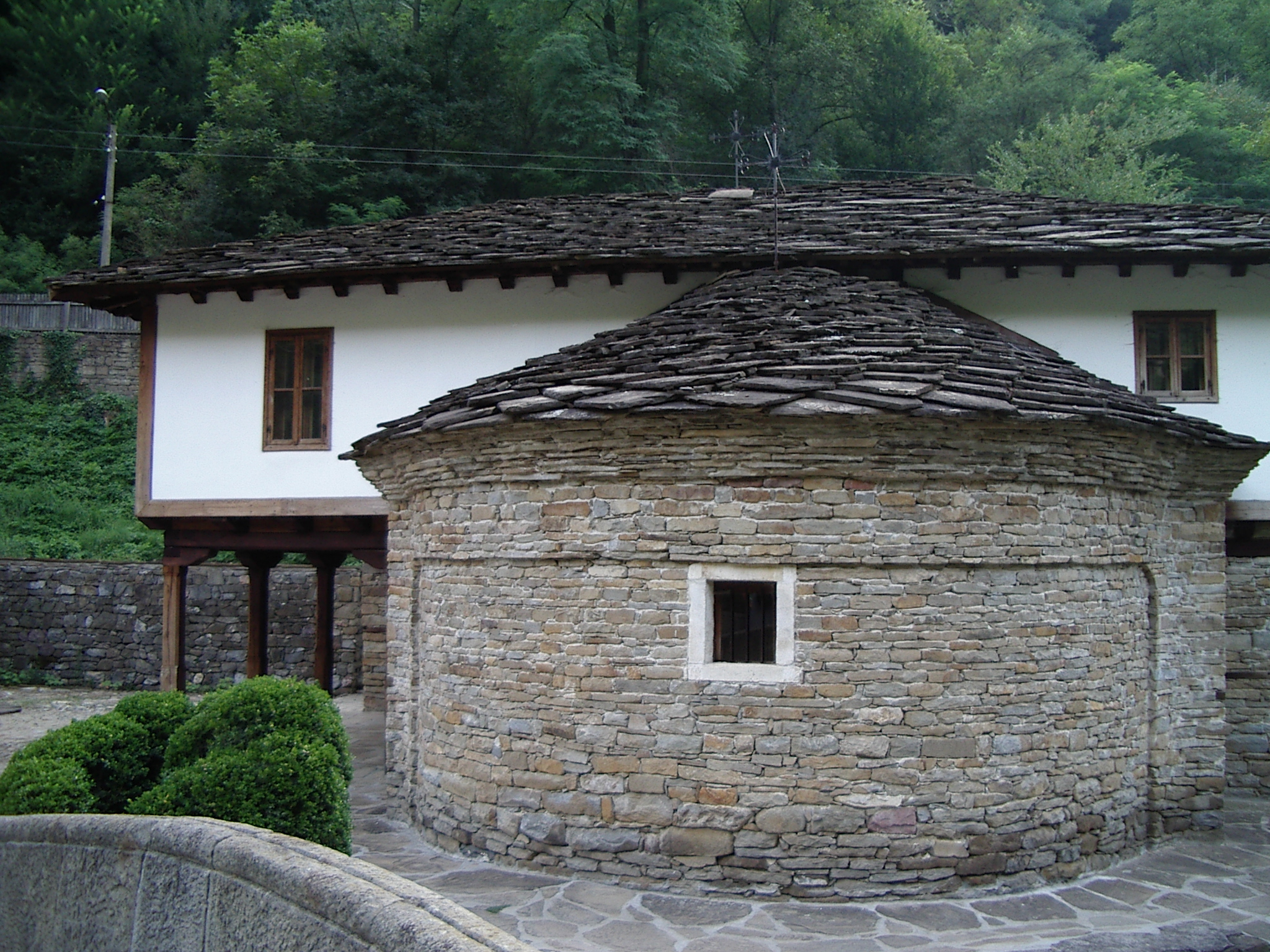

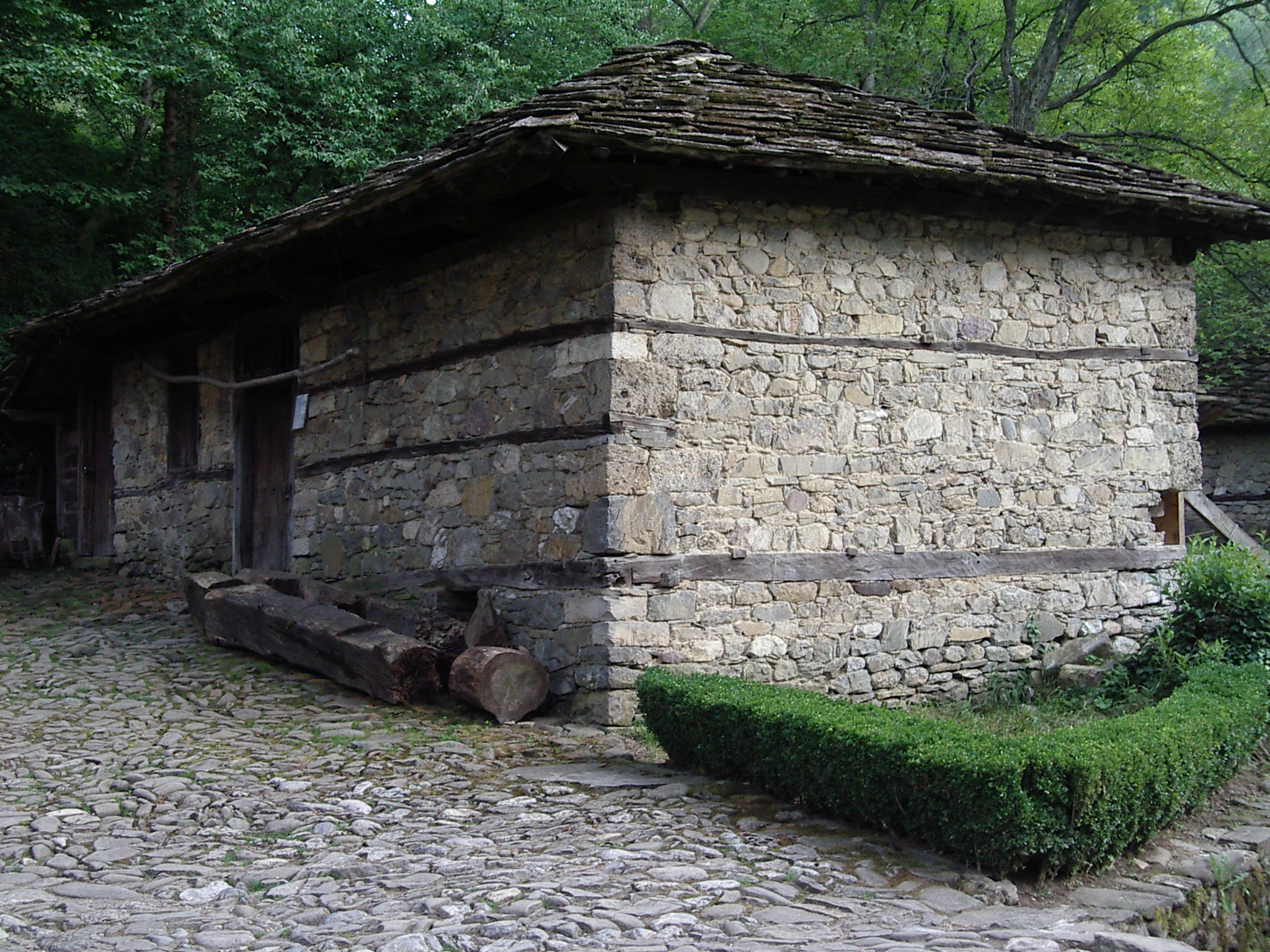

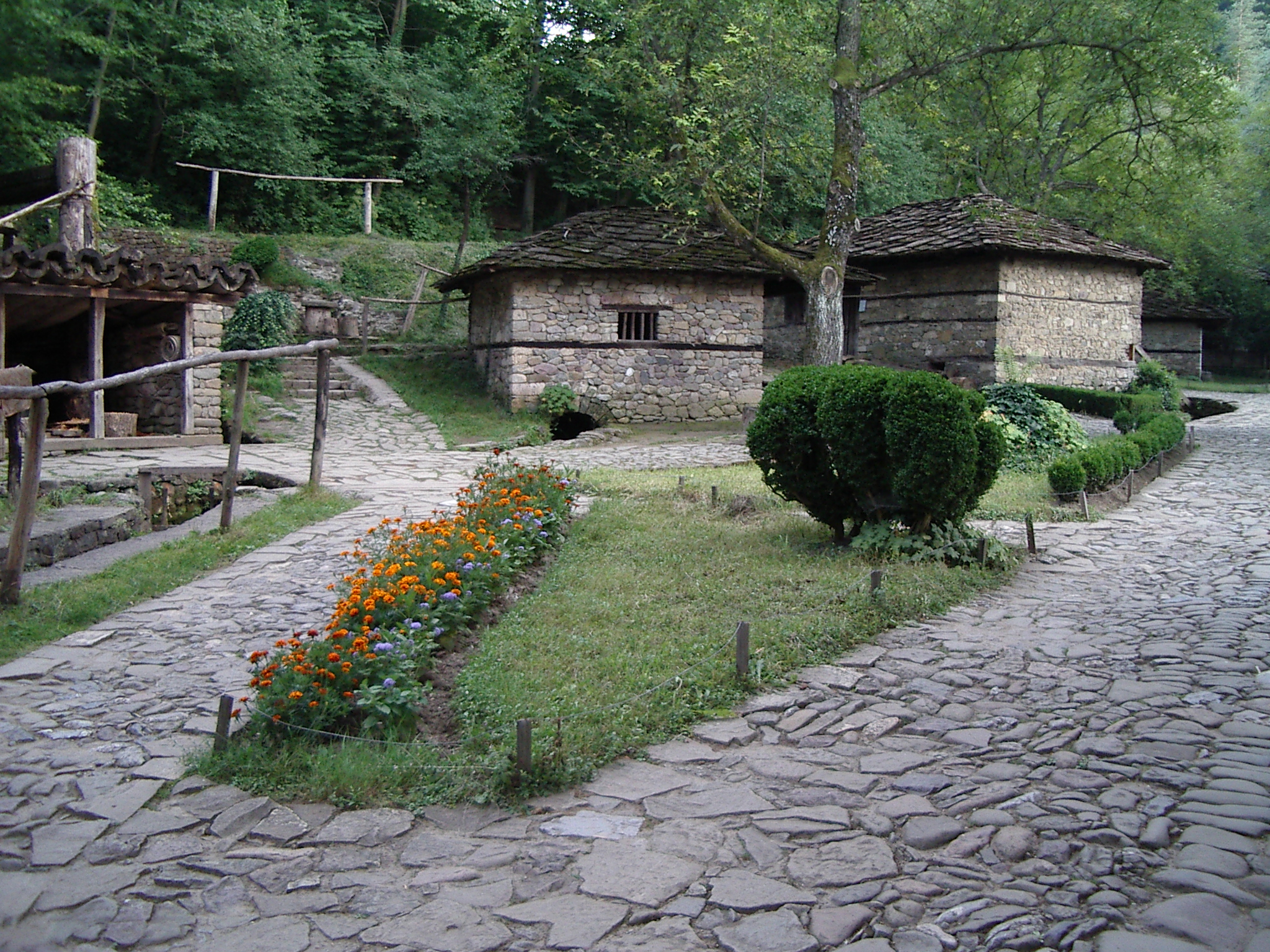

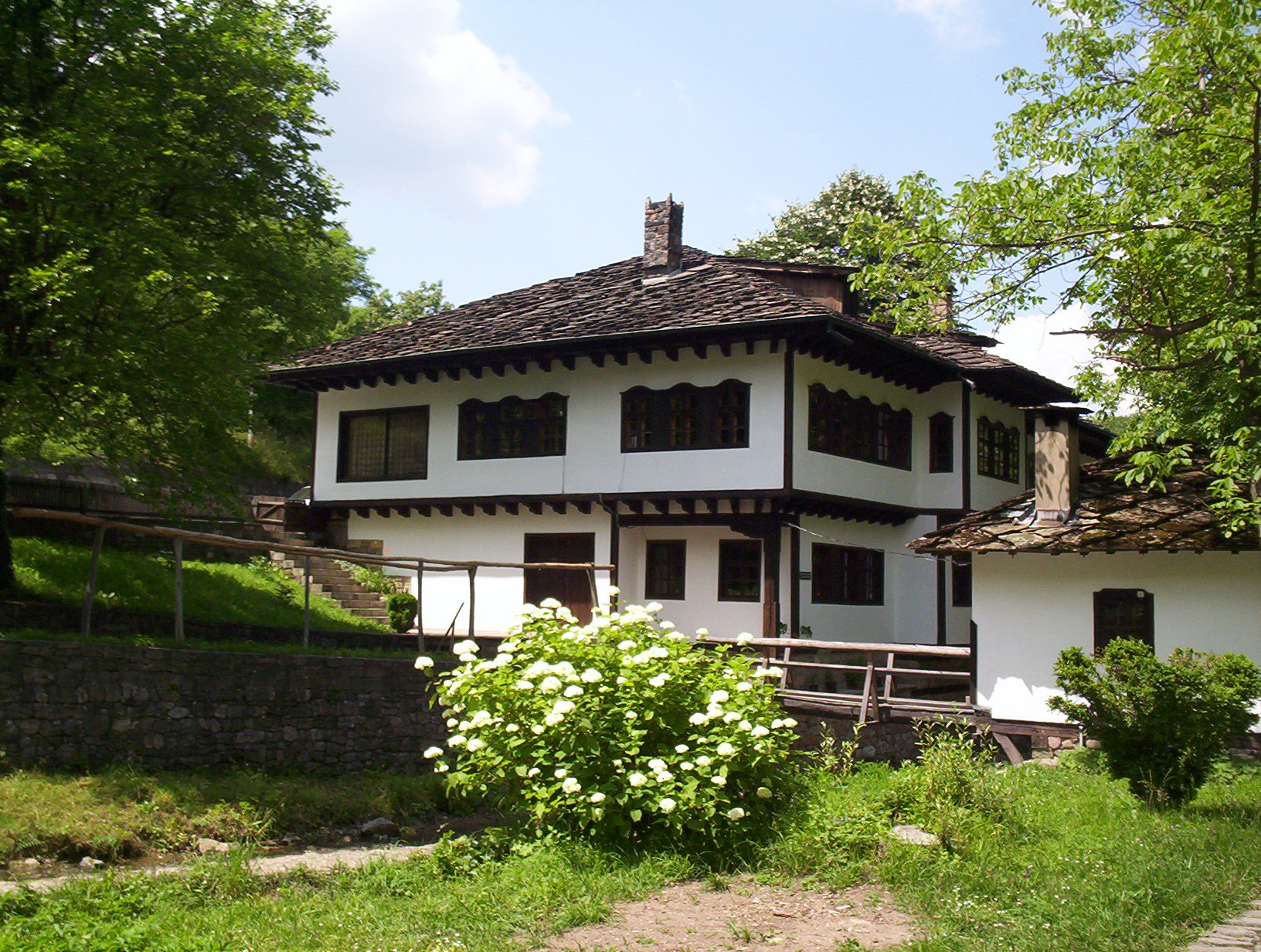

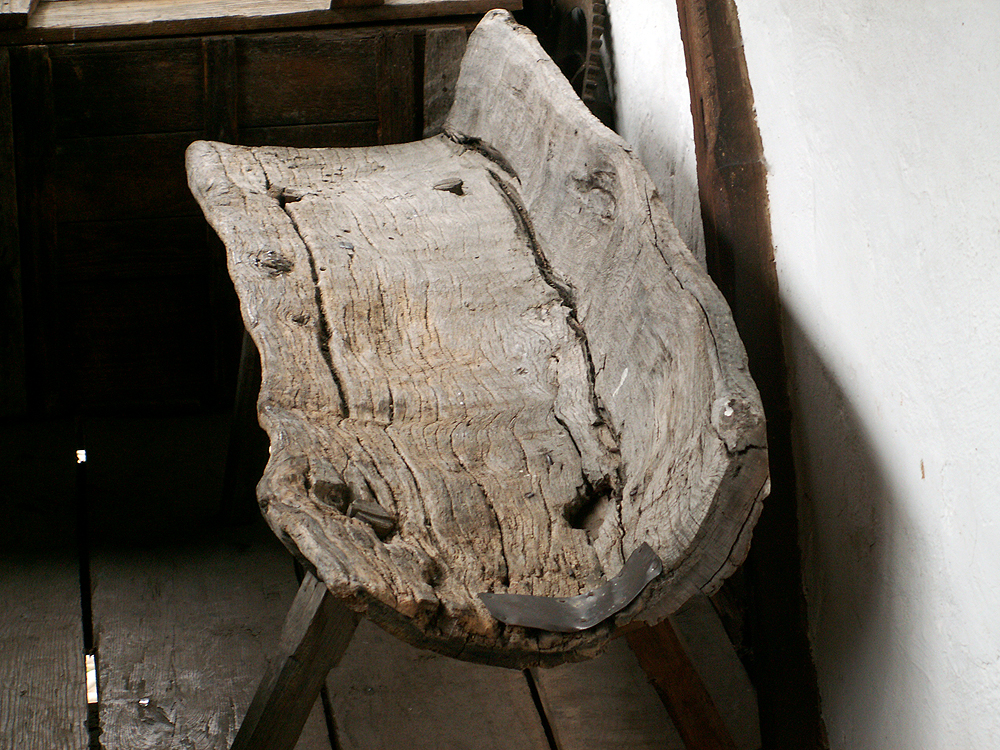
Ancient bench

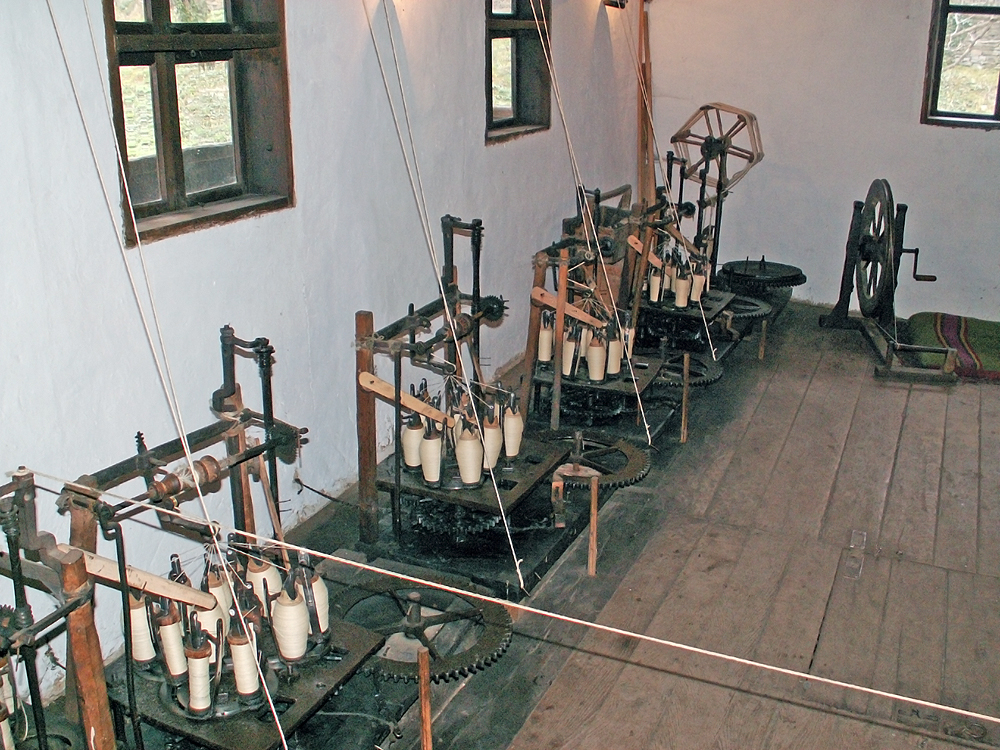
Early 19th century braiding machines

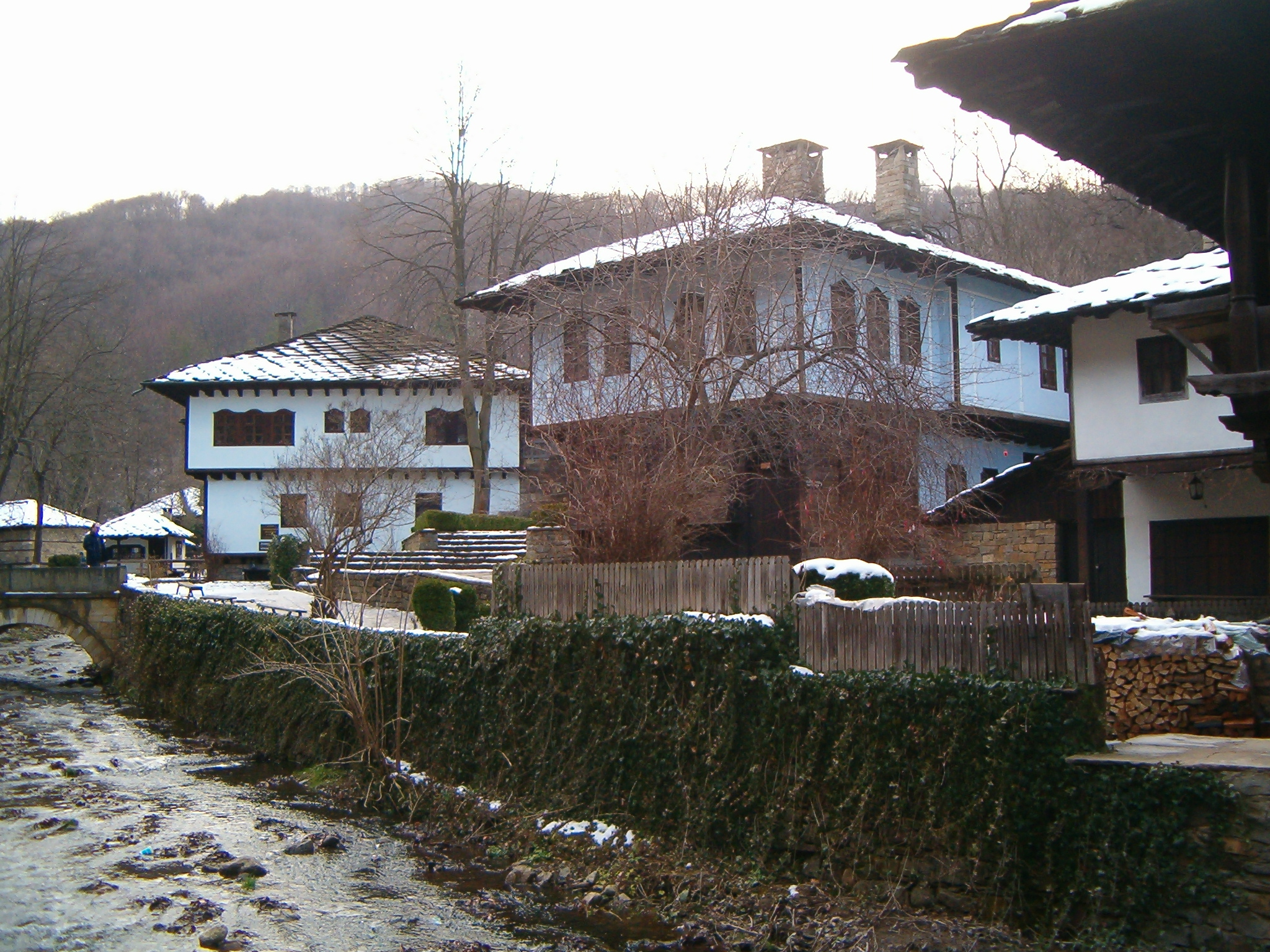

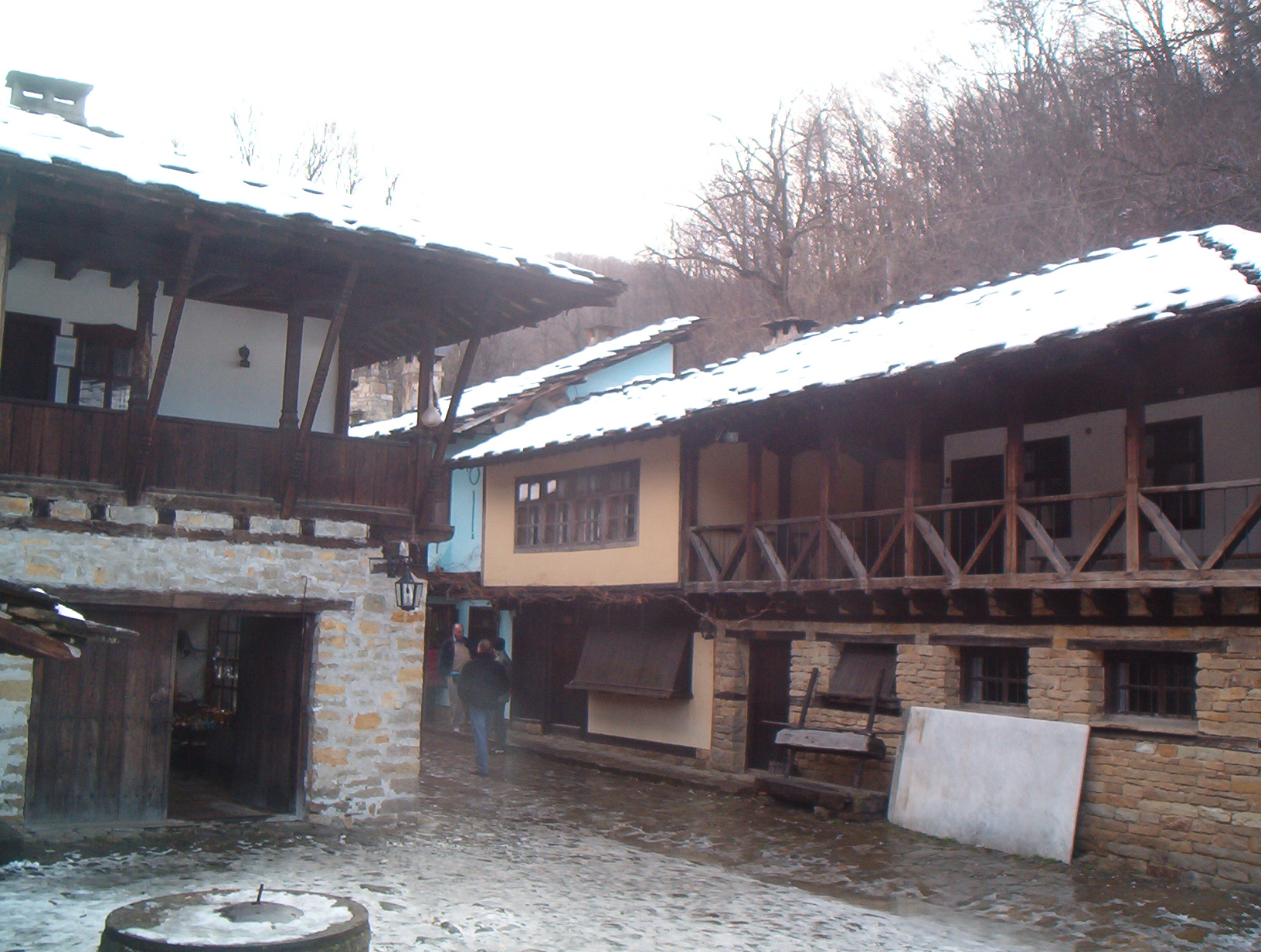

Video: Water equipment in the museum

== See also ==
- Battles of the Russo-Turkish War (1877–1878)
- History of Bulgaria
- Bulgarka Nature Park
- Heroes of Shipka
- History of Bulgaria
- Gabrovo City
- Shipka Memorial
- Shipka Pass
