= Slavčo Temelkovski =

Macedonian basketball player

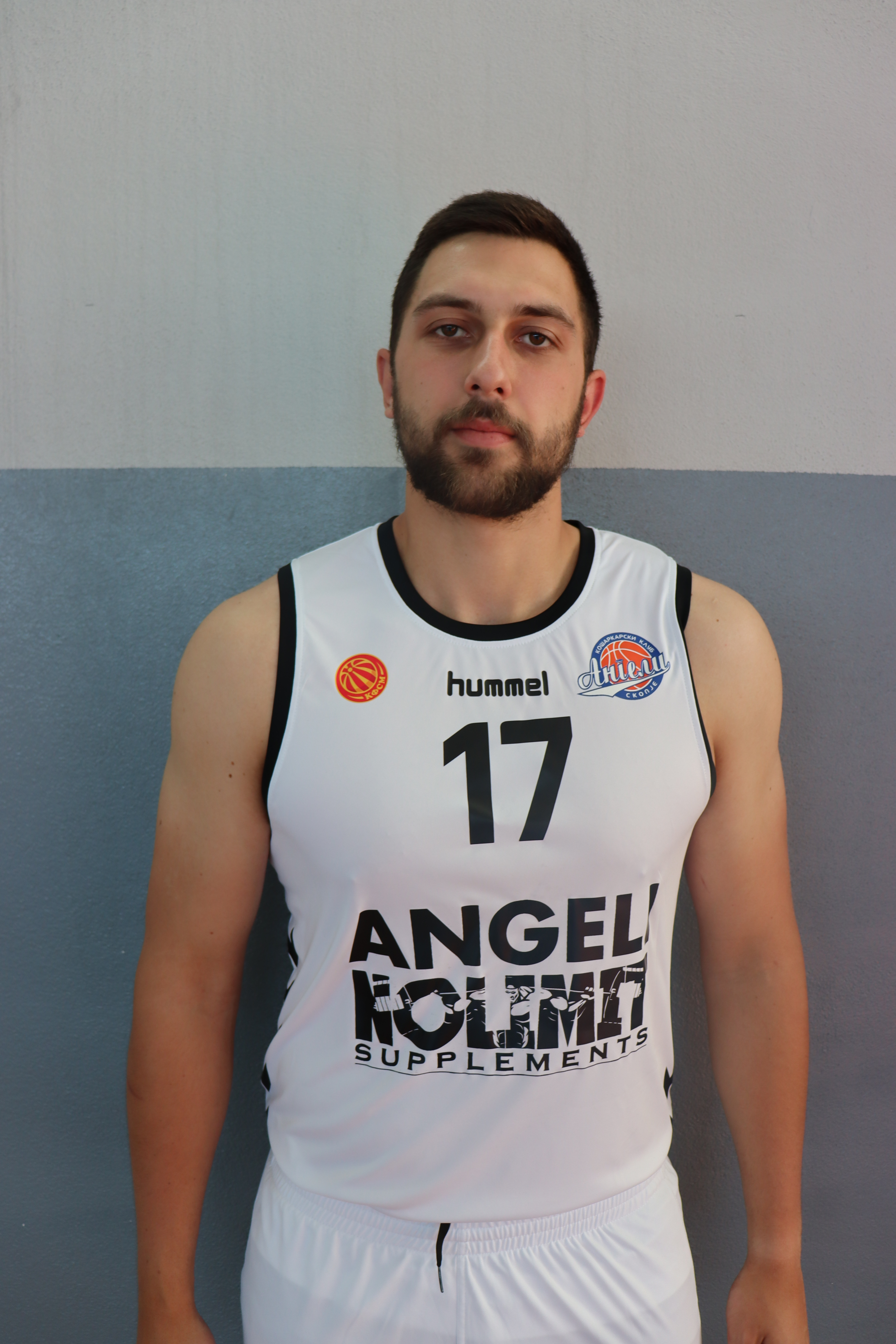

Akademija FMP
- Position: Center
- League: Macedonian First League

Personal information
- Born: October 17, 2000 (age 26) Macedonia
- Listed height: 2.03 m (6 ft 8 in)

Career information
- Playing career: 2017–present

Career history
- 2017–2018: Rabotnički
- 2019–2020: Vardar
- 2020–present: Akademija FMP

Slavčo Temelkovski, Славчо Темелковски (born October 17, 2000) is a Macedonian professional basketball Center, who currently plays for Akademija FMP in the Macedonian First League.

== Early years ==
On June 4, 2018, Temelkovski was named Most valuable player (MVP) on under-18 Final-four tournament in Skopje. In the final he posted 28 points and 20 rebounds, in a 93-69 win against MZT.

== Professional career ==
He started his career in Rabotnički. On his debut for the club, he achieved 1 assist and 4 rebounds in an 85–103 win over the Shkupi.

== Junior ABA League ==
On November 24, 2017, he was loaned to MZT Skopje U19 for the semi-final tournament in Belgrade. He made his debut for the MZT Skopje in their season opener scoring 6 points, seven rebounds and one assist in an 86–82 win over the Mornar Bar U19. He had the best performance on the tournament in the game against Cibona U19 scoring 16 points, 10 rebounds and 2 assists.
