= Slavcho Toshev =

Bulgarian footballer

Personal information
- Date of birth: 27 July 1980 (age 46)
- Place of birth: Pazardzhik, Bulgaria
- Height: 1.95 m (6 ft 5 in)
- Position: Goalkeeper

Youth career
- Septemvri Sofia

Senior career*
Years	Team	Apps	(Gls)
1998–1999	Septemvri Sofia	32	(0)
1999–2002	Lokomotiv Sofia		
2002–2006	Slavia Sofia	39	(0)
2006–2007	Vihren Sandanski	6	(0)
2007–2009	Botev Plovdiv	19	(0)
Total		96	(0)

International career
1999–2001	Bulgaria U21	13	(0)
- * Club domestic league appearances and goals

Slavcho Toshev (Bulgarian: Славчо Тошев; born 27 August 1980) is a Bulgarian former professional footballer who played as a goalkeeper. Throughout his club career, he played for Septemvri Sofia, Lokomotiv Sofia, Slavia Sofia, Vihren Sandanski and Botev Plovdiv.

== Career ==
Born in Sofia Toshev started to play in local team Septemvri. In June 1998 he signed first professional contract with Septemvri. Toshev made his official debut in Bulgarian first division on 18-years old in a match against CSKA Sofia on 16 October 1998. He substituted Plamen Nikolov in first half and played for 60 minutes. The result of the match was a 1:3 loss for Septemvri.

In 2000 Toshev signed a four-year contract with Slavia Sofia, but for three years did not play in official matches. He was a reserve of Viktor Georgiev, Evghen Nemodruk and Jane Nikolovski. Toshev made his official debut for Slavia in a match against Lokomotiv Sofia on 19 April 2003. He substituted Jane Nikolovski in second half and played for 40 minutes. Following an injury at the start of the 2003-04 season, Slavcho found himself benched as a result of substitute Armen Ambartsumyan's good performances, and only played four matches for his team that year. In season 2004-05 Toshev is a first choice of the coach and played 23 matches.

After his contract with Slavia expired in June 2006, he made a move to Vihren Sandanski. From 2007 he played for Botev Plovdiv until he left the club in 2009. He has worked as a goalkeeping coach at Hebar.

Toshev was in a long-term relationship with journalist Simona Parvanova until 2009.
