= Slavcho Vasev =

Bulgarian Writer and Politician

Slavcho Vasev Velev
- Born: June 19, 1906; Zablyano, Kingdom of Bulgaria
- Died: August 16, 1990 (age 84); Sofia, Bulgaria
- Education: Sofia University
- Occupations: Writer, Politician.

Slavcho Vasev Velev (June 19, 1906 – August 16, 1990) was a Bulgarian writer and politician who was a member of the Bulgarian Communist Party.

== Biography ==
He was born on June 19, 1906, in the Pernik village of Zablyano. In 1932 he graduated in philosophy from Sofia University. In the same year, together with other like-minded people, he founded the Union of Labor Writers. In the period 1936 to 1944 he was deputy editor-in-chief of the Zarya newspaper. He became a member of the Bulgarian Communist Party in 1944. After the September 9 coup, he was vice-chairman of the Committee on Science, Arts and Culture. Between 1948 and 1953 he was a press attaché at the Bulgarian Embassy in Moscow. He was the Editor-in-Chief of the Literary Front From 1959 to 1964 he was chairman of the Union of Bulgarian Journalists. For two years between 1964 and 1966 he was director of the Ivan Vazov National Theater. In the period 1966 to 1971 he was a member of the Central Committee of the Bulgarian Communist Party. He was awarded the Order of Georgi Dimitrov. He died on August 16, 1990.

== Bibliography ==
- Ours in Moscow, Ed. Bulgarian writer, 1966
- Hristo Hrolev-Grafa. Biographical Essay, Ed. of the Bulgarian Communist Party, 1966
- In the minutes before twelve: Selected works, Ed. Bulgarian writer, 1976
- 10 of the year, Ed. People's Youth, 1980
- Pages for Dimitrov, Ed. of the Bulgarian Agrarian Union, 1984
- The Red Stork, Ed. Bulgarian writer, 1986
- Battle for a new world. Notes of the journalist, memoirs and journalism, Ed. Bulgarian writer, 1986
