= Slavcho Krumov =

Bulgarian politician (1975–2026)

- Славчо Крумов
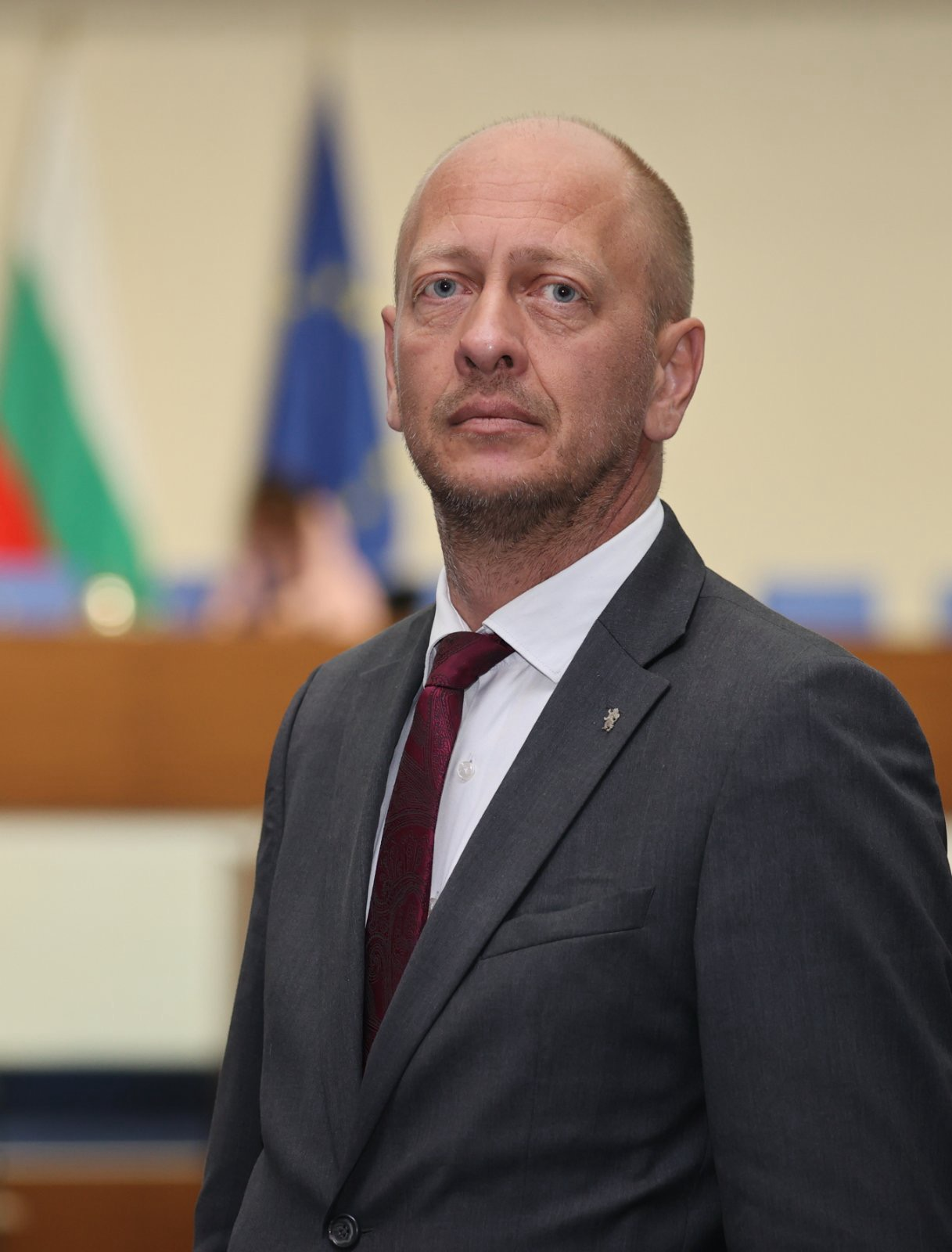
- Krumov in 2024

Member of the National Assembly of Bulgaria for the 25th Multi-member Constituency
- In office 12 April 2023 – 1 March 2026

Personal details
- Born: Slavcho Angelov Krumov; 8 October 1975 Sofia, Bulgaria
- Died: 1 March 2026 (aged 50) Sofia, Bulgaria
- Party: Revival
- Occupation: Construction contractor

Slavcho Angelov Krumov (Bulgarian: Славчо Ангелов Крумов; 8 October 1975 – 1 March 2026) was a Bulgarian politician. A member of Revival, he served in the National Assembly from 2023 to 2026.

Krumov died in Sofia on 1 March 2026, at the age of 50.
