= Candidus of Fulda =

9th-century Benedictine scholar

Candidus (Bruun) of Fulda was a Benedictine scholar of the ninth-century Carolingian Renaissance, a student of Einhard, and author of the vita of his abbot at Fulda, Eigil.

== Biography ==
He received his first instruction from the learned Eigil, Abbot of Fulda, 818–822. Abbot Ratgar (802–817) sent the gifted scholar to Einhard at the court of Charlemagne, where he most probably learned the art he employed later in decorating with pictures the western apse of St. Salvator, the so-called Ratgerbasilica, to which, in 819, the remains of Saint Boniface were transferred. When Rabanus Maurus was made abbot (822), Candidus (who describes himself as a magister or teacher) may have succeeded him as head of the monastic school of Fulda. In any case as one of the most distinguished scholars of his monastery and as a renowned artist, he was among the leaders of the community of Fulda. In his later life he was adopted as an administrator of one of the so-called ministeria, administration units of the landed property outside of Fulda. Yet this honorable function gave him reason to complain of the lack of intellectual conversation in his loneliness far from the monastic community of Fulda.

In the crisis caused by the austerity and severity of Abbot Ratgar, he seems to have tried to mediate between the struggling parties, but without lasting success. Finally in 817, Ratgar was deposed by the Emperor Louis the Pious. After one year under two missi of the emperor who introduced the Anianian reform, the monastery was allowed to elect a new abbot. Eigil, the leader of the opposition against Ratger, was elected as his successor. Eigil's life is the subject of the only surviving work of Candidus. (His life of Baugulf, abbot of Fulda 779–802, has been lost.)

During his later years Candidus saw the increasing conflicts between Louis the Pious and his sons and, after their father’s death, between the sons themselves. This difficult political situation inevitably resulted in a new crisis for Fulda, because abbot Rabanus Maurus, who was a follower of Louis the Pious and after his death of the eldest son Emperor Lothar I, was forced to resign by King Louis the German after the former’s defeat in the battle of Fontenoy (25. June 841). The abbey's fragile peace was threatened by a new conflict between followers of the warring kings as well as a struggle between candidates for the abbacy. Bruun Candidus seems to have had ambitions to succeed Rabanus Maurus. In his Vita Aegili abbatis Fuldensis, he implicitly promotes his candidacy by showing his expertise in all questions of monastic life. It was not Candidus, however, but Rabanus' close friend Hatto who was elected abbot in 842. Candidus died in 845.

== Wrongly attributed works ==
Some scholars saw Candidus even as a philosopher. But, as Christine Ineichen-Eder has pointed out, the so-called "Dicta de imagine mundi" or "Dei", twelve aphoristic sayings strung together without logical sequence, are the work of Candidus-Wizo, a pupil of Alcuin. The doctrine is taken from the works of St. Augustine, but the frequent use of the syllogism marks the border of the age of Scholasticism.

=== Proof of God's existence ===
In his last saying Candidus makes somewhat timidly the first attempt in the Middle Ages at a proof of God's existence. This has a striking similarity to the ontological argument of St. Anselm. (Man, by intellect a better and more powerful being that the rest, is not almighty; therefore a superior and almighty being — God — must exist).

The third saying, which denies that bodies are true, since truth is a quality of immortal beings only, is based on that excessive realism which led his contemporary, Fridugisus, to invest even nothingness with being.

The other sayings deal with God's image in man's soul, the concepts of existence, substance, time, etc. The philosophy of Candidus marks a progress over Alcuin and gives him rank with Fredegisus, from whom he differs by rarely referring to the Bible in philosophical questions, thus keeping apart the domains of theology and philosophy.

=== Dicta Candidi ===
The only complete edition of the Dicta Candidi is in Hauréau. There is a more critical edition of a portion of it in Richter. Candids-Wizo, not Bruun Candidus of Fulda, is also the author of an Exposition Passionis D.N.J. Chr. and of a letter concerning the question, Quod Christus dominus noster, in quantum homo fuit, cum hic mortalis inter mortales viveret, Deum videre potuisset.

== Genuine Works ==
The preserved Life of Abbot Eigil of Fulda (died 822) in prose and verse and the lost "Life" of Abbot Baugolf of Fulda (d. 802) were both written by Bruun Candidus of Fulda. The "Life" of Abbot Eigil (Vita Aegili), written around 840, is the first known illustrated biography. The Vita Aegili is an opus geminatum or "twinned work," that is, a work consisting of a pair of texts, one in prose and one in verse. Candidus says that the Abbot of Fulda, Raban Maur, instructed him to compose the life. The Vita Aegili is an outstanding specimen of biography from the Carolingian Renaissance and an important source for the monastic reform of Benedict of Aniane. Candidus describes the conflict between Eigil's predecessor Ratgar (whom Candidus depicts as the unicorn that attacks the shepherd in Psalm 21) and the monastic community, which led to his deposition by Louis the Pious in 817, and also provides information about the discussions concerning the election of Ratgar's successor. He also describes two churches built at Fulda: first St. Salvator, the so-called Ratger-basilica, completed and augmented with two crypts by the monk Rachulf and dedicated 1. November 819, and second, St. Michael erected by Rabanus Maurus and dedicated 15. January 822. Candidus explains that its architecture—a centralized building with eight columns in the nave, one central column in the crypt and one single keystone in the vault—has a spiritual meaning, representing Christ and his ecclesia. Candidus also quotes the tituli (inscriptions) that Rabanus composed for the altars of both churches, and Eigil's two epitaphs, written by Eigil himself and by Rabanus. Candidus also recounts the dedication ceremony of St. Salvator and the translation of the relics of St. Boniface from his tomb in the centre of the church to his new crypt in the western apse. The hymnsTe deum and Gloria in excelsis, which were sung during the ceremony, are translated into verse. The source for the Vita's lost illustration to this hymns may have been the aforementioned apse picture, which Candidus claims he executed, and which is probably reflected in three sacramentary manuscripts of the Ottonian age (Göttingen, Niedersächsische Staats- und Universitätsbibliothek 2° Ms. theol. 231 Cim., fol. 111r; Udine, Archivio Capitolare, Cod. 1, f. 66v; Bamberg State Library, Msc.Lit.1, fol. 165v).

== Bibliography ==
- Candidus Bruun, Vita Aeigili, liber II (= vita metrica). In E. Duemmeler, ed. Monumenta Germaniae Historica Poetae Latini Aevi Carolini Vol. II. Berlin, 1884, pp. 94–117 (incomplete).
- Gereon Becht-Jördens, "Vita Aegil abbatis Fuldenis a Candido ad Modestum edita prosa et versibus. Ein Opus geminum des IX. Jahrhunderts. Einleitung und kritische Edition" (phil. Diss. Heidelberg), Marburg (Selbstverlag) 1994.
- Gereon Becht-Jördens, Die Vita Aegil abbatis Fuldensis des Brun Candidus. Ein opus geminum aus dem Zeitalter der anianischen Reform in biblisch figuralem Hintergrundstil, Frankfurt am Main 1992 (ISBN 3-7820-0649-6).
- Gereon Becht-Jördens, "Litterae illuminatae. Zur Geschichte eines literarischen Formtyps in Fulda." In Gangolf Schrimpf (Ed.), Kloster Fulda in der Welt der Karolinger und Ottonen (Fuldaer Studien 7), Frankfurt am Main 1996 (ISBN 3-7820-0707-7), p. 325-364.
- Gereon Becht-Jördens, "Die Vita Aegil des Brun Candidus als Quelle zu Fragen aus der Geschichte Fuldas im Zeitalter der anianischen Reform." In Hessisches Jahrbuch für Landesgeschichte 42 (1992), pp. 19–48.
- Christine Ineichen-Eder, "Künstlerische und literarische Tätigkeit des Candidus-Brun von Fulda." In Fuldaer Geschichtsblätter 56, 1980, p. 201-217 (without notes but with illustrations of considerable value also in Winfrid Böhne (Ed.), Hrabanus Maurus und seine Schule. Festschrift der Rabanus-Maurus-Schule 1980, Fulda 1980, p. 182-192).
