= De litteris colendis =

The Epistola de litteris colendis is a well-known letter addressed by Emperor Charlemagne to Abbot Baugulf of Fulda, probably written sometime in the late 780s to 800s (decade), although the exact date is still debatable. The letter is a very important witness to the Carolingian educational reforms during the Carolingian Renaissance from the late 8th century to the 9th century. The letter shows Emperor Charlemagne's interest in promoting learning and education within his empire.

The oldest existing copy of this letter comes from the 8th century. Another version dates back to the 11th century. The older of the two surviving manuscripts are located at Wuerzburg and offer the original text addressed to Abbot Baugulf. The more recent manuscript (Metz, bibl mun forth. o nr 226,.. SAEC XI, burned in 1945), whose text is preserved by older editions, is the revised version offered for Angilram, who was charged with further dissemination.

The Epistola de litteris colendis is the earliest, and one of the most important, sources promoting the advance of educational reforms throughout Charlemagne's Empire. It was followed by the more detailed Admonitio generalis.

In the letter, Charlemagne expresses his concern about the literacy of monks and priests, many of whom were illiterate or only partially literate. Charlemagne expresses concern that their poor literacy may lead them to make errors or interpret the bible and scriptures incorrectly.

== Authorship ==
The well-known letter is addressed by Emperor Charlemagne, also known as Charles I. Charlemagne became the King of the Franks in 768 and the King of Italy in 774. He would later become the Emperor of the Carolingian Empire. Charlemagne carried on his father Pepin the Short's policy with the papacy and viewed himself as its protector. Charlemagne's admiration for learning led to his interest in scholarship. He encouraged his children to be well-educated and studied under Peter of Pisa, Alcuin of York, and Einhard. Charlemagne's greatest weakness however, according to Einhard was his inability to write. Even his ability to read has been called into question.

This letter was presumably written by Alcuin of York, not by Charlemagne himself. Alcuin was Charlemagne's teacher in rhetoric, logic, and astronomy. Alcuin wrote several theological and philosophical treatises. The director of the palace school at Aachen at the time was encouraged by Charlemagne to introduce Carolingian minuscule, a script to standardize the Latin alphabet to be recognized by literate classes from one region to another. The letter was argued to contain literary elements that were Alcuinisms, indicating Alcuin's heavy influence.

== Content/Summary ==
De litteris colendis is the second Carolingian document to urge the formation of schools. The scope of teaching advocated suggests a broader view than that in the Admonitio generalis. Here the text embraces all ancient learning and completes understanding of the Bible as a primary goal.

In the letter, Charlemagne expresses his views on knowledge and conduct, stating that because knowledge precedes conduct, people must study about the goals he wishes to accomplish without making any errors. Errors should be shunned by men and avoided at all cost so that these chosen people can become the servants of truth. Charlemagne refers to the mind and the tongue to be uneducated on account of the neglect of study and therefore unable to express the truth in letters. Charlemagne worries that the lack of literate skills in monks and priests at the time may lead to a lack of understanding of the Holy Scriptures. Errors of understanding are a greater danger than errors of speech because misunderstanding of the Holy Scriptures can result in divine punishment, such as damnation. Charlemagne encourages these soldiers of the church to never neglect the study of letters in order to correctly uncover the meanings of Scripture. Those who teach letters are chosen for this because of their ability in learning and instructing others. Charlemagne's view on teaching shows his concerns about the education of monks and priests at the time and advocated the need for better understanding of the original source, the Bible. At the end of the letter Charlemagne wishes for the wide spread of this letter to all the monasteries and into the hands of fellow-bishops.

The wisdom for understanding the Holy Scriptures might be much less than it rightly ought to be. And we all know well that, although errors of speech are dangerous, far more dangerous are errors of the understanding. --Emperor Charlemagne, De Litteris Colendis

== Background information ==
Charlemagne's views on education displayed in this letter, among many works, encourage Carolingian schoolmasters to seize the opportunity to teach many ancient works, books such as Martianus Capella's De nuptiis Philologiae et Mercurii and Boethius's De institutione musica. The letter was written at a time that saw the organization and transformation of the Frankish Kingdom into a large Christian state. The new Christian culture within the Carolingian realm was acquired with relative ease because late-antique Christian writers suggested various ways to integrate secular arts into Christian education. Charlemagne wanted to control and oversee a strong relationship between the states of learning and the Christian faith. De litteris colendis, along with Admonitio generalis, is a statement of the king's religious faith and obligations. After the expansion of the Carolingian realm, Charlemagne recognized the need for reform to promote the correct use of Latin language and correct understanding of Christian faith and text. This was a way to enhance Frankish identity. Literacy was required and rewarded during Charlemagne's reign.

Alcuin, the suspected author of the letter, expressed views on the intrinsic Christian value of the liberal arts that were not widely accepted by many. However, Alcuin influenced some of the most sophisticated Carolingian thinkers of the first half of the 9th century. The original letter by Charlemagne was likely written to Baugulf, but the text would reach Baugulf at a later time after the written date.

The ability to read and write was not very common in the Frankish Kingdom during the late 8th century, and Charlemagne wanted to create an education system to provide training for future administrators in both sacred and secular realms. Alcuin, along with Paulinus of Aquileia, Peter of Pisa, Theodulf of Orleans was one of many intellectuals invited by Charlemagne to implement the king's program of education reform. Alcuin was appointed to take over the direction of the palace school. Alcuin's program is reflected by his established program at St. Martin of Tours, where Alcuin put emphasis on writing, reading, and grammar; elements the Epistola de litteris colendis heavily advocated. The existence of the palace school has been called into question.

== Dating the Letter ==
Many historians make the assumption that the letter was sent directly to an unknown archbishop based on the mentions of the co-bishops, but the abbot could very well be the actual recipient of this letter. The letter belongs to the tradition of Anglo-Saxon humanism. The request at the end of the letter extends to monks as lower clerics. Luitpold Wallach argues that coincidental similarities with the Capitulare Francofurtense contained in this letter suggest 794 as the earliest possible year when this letter to Baugulf was written. The letter is also paralleled by a letter written by Alcuin to Fulda after 800. Because of Alcuin's letter to Fulda from Tours at a later date, this would mean that ’De litteris colendis’ could not have been written at a time when Alcuin was already at St Martin's at Tours. More specifically, the letter addressing Baugulf is most likely written between June of 794, the period between the Synod of Frankfurt, and 796, Alcuin's arrival as abbot of St Martain at Tours. Another possible date of the Letter was as early as 784/5.

== See also ==
- Admonitio Generalis
- Carolingian dynasty
- Carolingian Empire
- Carolingian Renaissance
