= Ratgar =

Ratgar was a controversial abbot at the famous Benedictine monastery of Fulda during the early ninth century.

== Life ==
Ratgar was abbot of the monastery of Fulda from 802 until 817. He was from a noble family in Germania, and was sent by his parents to Fulda, whose monastery school was already becoming a renowned center of learning. which was at the time ruled by Saint Sturm, a disciple of Saint Boniface. Sturm died in 779 and Baugulf succeeded him as abbot, ruling until his retirement in 802, when he was succeeded by Ratgar.

The sources on Ratgar's abbacy provide conflicting pictures of his rule. The future abbot of Fulda, Hraban Maur, writes of Ratgar in several poems. In one he praises the grand building projects Ratgar undertook, calling him a "wise architect." The great Basilica, dedicated by Archbishop Haistolf in 819, was undertaken during his reign.

Ratgar also showed concern for the education of the young monks in his care, sending them to study with the leading scholars of the day. He sent Hraban Maur (future abbot, archbishop and leading theologian) and Hatto to Tours to study the liberal arts with Alcuin, the founding scholar of the Carolingian Renaissance. He sent Candidus Bruun and Modestus to study with another luminary, Charlemagne's biographer Einhard, and he sent Candidus and others to Clemens Scottus, one of the many renowned Irish scholars living on the continent.

On the other hand, it seems he was excessively severe on his monks. Hraban Maur, in another poem, recounts that a number of monks seceded from Ratgar's Rule. The Saxon Chronicle recounts that, in 811, there was a great disturbance among the monks at Fulda, and other contemporary chronicles also mention chaos and dissent among the brothers, noting that a delegation of 12 monks made a plea before Charlemagne for him to reform the monastery.

Candidus Bruun, who lived at Fulda throughout Ratgar's reign, paints an extremely negative picture of Ratgar. He nicknames Ratgar "monoceros", meaning "unicorn" (the unicorn was considered a violent and dangerous beast), and depicts an abbey divided by dissent.

Despite the attempts of several bishops and archbishops to intervene, Ratgar continued his manner of rule among the monks, until in 817 he was "charged and convicted" by the monks., and the Emperor Louis the Pious had him deposed and banished. Ratgar's successor Eigil restored peace in the divided monastery.

== See also ==
- Raban Maur
- Candidus Bruun of Fulda
- Sturm of Fulda

== Bibliography ==
- Candidus Bruun. Vita Aeigili, liber II (= vita metrica). In E. Duemmeler, ed. Monum. German. Histor.: Poetae Latini Aevi Carolini Vol. II. Berlin, 1884, pp. 94–117.
- Rudolf of Fulda. Miracula sanctorum in Fuldenses ecclesias translatorum. G. Waitz (Ed.) Monum. German. Histor.: Scriptore 15.1, pp. 328–41.
