= Carolingian libraries =

Libraries during the Carolingian period

The intellectual life of the Carolingian Empire and surrounding countries was centered around ecclesiastical institutions.

The Carolingian libraries emerged during the reign of the Carolingian dynasty, when book collections reappeared in Europe after a two-century cultural decline. The end of the 8th century marked the beginning of the so-called Carolingian Renaissance, a cultural upsurge primarily associated with church reform. The reform aimed to unify worship, correct church books, train qualified priests to work with the semi-pagan flock, and prepare missionaries capable of preaching throughout the empire and beyond. This required a comprehensive understanding of classical Latin and familiarity with surviving monuments of ancient culture.

The largest monasteries established schools to teach the fundamentals of the trivium and to study the works of Roman authors, including poets, historians, rhetoricians, philosophers, mathematicians, architects, etc. By the 9th century, a group of Carolingian polymaths had emerged who valued broad learning and associated activities for their own sake. This group was not limited to the capital.

During the Carolingian period, there were no libraries in the modern sense, in particular the special book depositories did not exist. However, there were relatively large collections of tens and hundreds of volumes, mostly belonging to monasteries and city bishops. Catalogues, rubrics and book lists, which began to be created in monasteries from the early 9th century, were needed to help people find their way around the vast number of manuscripts. Private book collections of clerics and laymen also emerged. After the owner's death, they were often transferred to monasteries. Unfortunately, no complete book collection from the Carolingian period has survived to this day.

== Sources ==
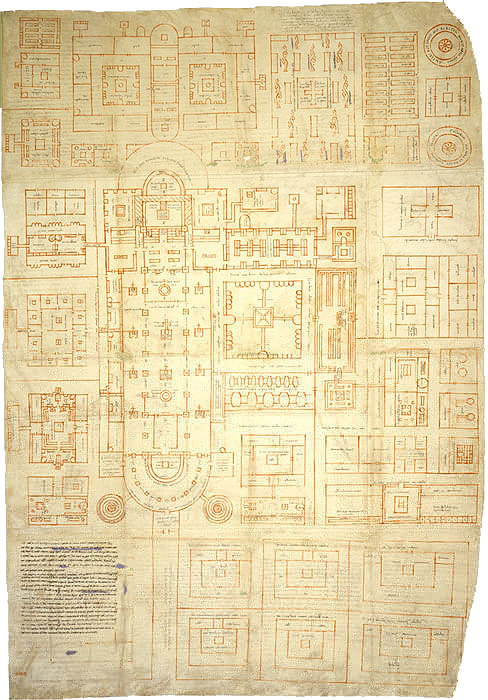
The idealised plan of Saint Gall, which also marks the location of the library. The plan dates back to around 820.

None of the Carolingian libraries have survived in their entirety. Information on the collections, composition, principles of acquisition, owners and users of the libraries is limited, but more complete than that relating to antiquity. During the 8th to 10th centuries, monks and priests, who were the primary bearers of intellectual culture in the early Middle Ages, compiled lists of books found in monastery vaults or known to them. Sometimes, such lists were accompanied by more or less extensive commentaries. During the Carolingian era, bibliography was not an independent discipline, and book lists were compiled solely for the purpose of inventorying collections. Presumably, the lists did not adequately convey the contents of the library collections, since there are numerous discrepancies in book catalogues from the same abbeys. Not all manuscripts with a known provenance are listed in the catalogues of the abbeys where they were created or stored.

During the Carolingian period, book lists were labelled with various terms such as brevis or breviarium librorum, inventarium librorum, annotatio librorum, descriptio librorum, abbreviatio librorum and even genealogia bibliothecae. These catalogues were typically attached to the works of the most authoritative authors read in a particular abbey. For example, Augustine's The City of God was used at Monte Cassino. At Lindisfarne, the book catalogue was placed at the beginning of the second volume of the Bible, which was arbitrarily bound in two codices. Meanwhile, at the Abbey of Saint Gall, annotated book catalogues, each several dozen pages long, were bound to a collection of Alcuin's writings and a codex with capitularies and Germanic law.

From the 9th century onwards, book lists became an integral part of monastic chronicles, particularly in Saint Gall. These sources allow for the precise determination of when a particular manuscript arrived in the collection, as the authors record its arrival in the monastery. Books were highly valued and were even mentioned in the wills of kings and nobles. Sometimes wills contain unique information. For example, a charter documented the composition of the book collection of Duke Eberhard of Friuli, which was divided among his sons. Additionally, valuable information can be found in the correspondence of Carolingian polymaths with their students, friends, and colleagues.

== Size of the library collections ==
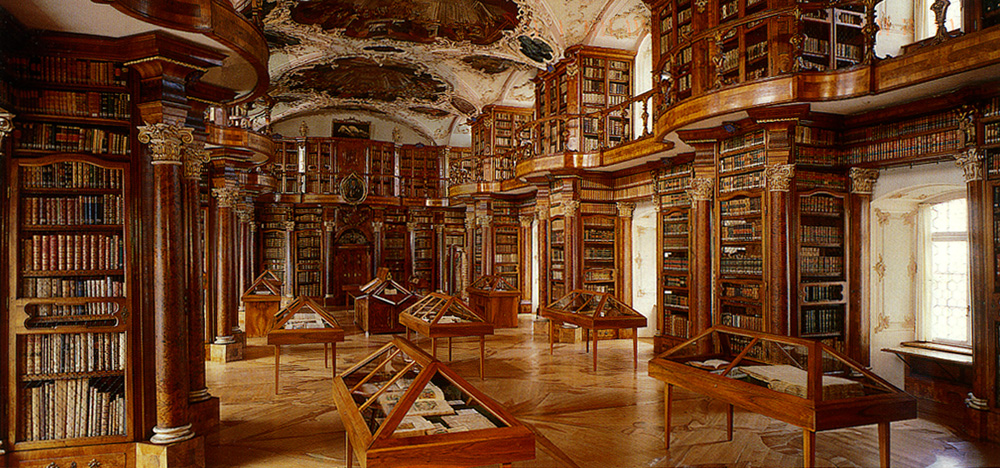
The interior of the Abbey library of Saint Gall. The interior dates back to the 18th century.

During the 9th to 10th centuries, monastic libraries often contained hundreds of codices, making them the largest in size. Surviving catalogues reveal that in 822, the collection of the Reichenau Abbey included 415 books, while the Saint-Riquier Abbey owned 243 books in 831. Similarly, the library of Saint Gall had 428 accounted books, Lorsch had 590, and the monastery of Saint Salvator in Würzburg had at least 209 codices. At the start of the 10th century, the Bobbio Abbey possessed 666 books, while the Saint Emmeram's Abbey had 513. Although the collections of other significant Carolingian monasteries, such as Fleury, Ferrières, Saint-Denis, Saint Martin at Tours, Saint-Remi, Corbie, and the Abbey of Fulda, were likely of similar size and composition, their library catalogues have not survived.

The library of a Carolingian abbey typically consisted of various manuscripts, as demonstrated by the Saint Gall catalogue Breviarium librorum de coenobio sancti Galli, which was composed of three manuscripts written in the 9th century. The Saint Gall library contained 10 codices of Augustine's works, 3 of Ambrose of Milan, and 2 each of Jerome, Gregory the Great, and Bede the Venerable. The Saint Gall library was generally conservative, focusing on the Bible and the works of the holy fathers before Bede. Between 840 and 880, the library acquired approximately 70 new codices, some of which were magnificently decorated. A notable feature of the Saint Gall library was the significant number of Irish manuscripts, with 30 listed in the catalogue. These manuscripts were acquired from outside the monastery, rather than being produced by Irish monks in the monastery's scriptorium.

Bishop's and cathedral libraries were established later than monastic libraries and were unable to match their size and content. In the 9th century there were only 39 books in Cologne, 71 in Weißenburg, 40 in Passau and 42 in Oviedo. Reims, under the care of its bishop Hinkmar, had approximately one hundred books. Salzburg had only 14 books, Augsburg had 50, Lindisfarne had 52, and Cremona had 95 books.

During the Carolingian period, laymen's private libraries emerged, often containing several dozen manuscripts. One of the most well-known is Eberhard of Friul's library, which was precisely listed in his will of 863. The library consisted of approximately 50 manuscripts, primarily focused on educational and religious content, but also including works on military art, jurisprudence, geography and history. The contents of Charlemagne's personal library, on the other hand, are not very well documented. According to the biography written by Einhard, Charlemagne "collected a great number of books" (De vita Karoli, 33). However, there is no further information on the specific contents of his library. It is known that Charles held the works of Augustine, including The City of God, in high regard (24). Additionally, during meals, he had readings about the history and deeds of the ancients. Donald Bullough attempted to reconstruct the composition of Charlemagne's library and concluded that it was based on educational literature. However, in terms of quantity, it was far inferior to the monastic libraries of both his time and earlier periods, such as the bishop's library of Jarrow under Bede the Venerable.

== Catalogues ==
The initial efforts to catalogue library collections were primarily focused on the practical task of locating manuscripts that readers required and organising a vast collection. This objective was first achieved in the early 9th century at the Reichenau Abbey. The monks created a thematic catalogue and an author's index (wherever possible to indicate the author). The sections of Reichenau's catalogue included De libris canonum, De regulis, De libris homeliarum, De passionibus sanctorum, De libris glossarum, De opusculis Eusebii episcopi, De libris Iosephi, De opusculis Orosii presbyteri, De libris Bedae presbyteri, and others. The compilers distinguished between the text of a work (liber) and the number of volumes it was presented in (volumen, codex). The Reichenau occasionally described the contents of codices in which many works by different authors were interwoven. Such work was done by the monk Reginbert, who described all the codices he had given to the monastery. The catalogue at Reichenau did not always adhere to a consistent order. For example, the books of Flavius Josephus were listed separately, despite the presence of a designated rubric for them.

The catalogues of Saint-Riquier, Oviedo, Bobbio, Lorsch, Murbach, and Saint Gall use similar rubrication and provide more or less detailed descriptions of individual codices. However, most booklists from the 9th to 10th centuries are simply enumerations of titles without any discernible order. It is possible that they were grouped by the names of past and present owners.

== Forming of book collections ==
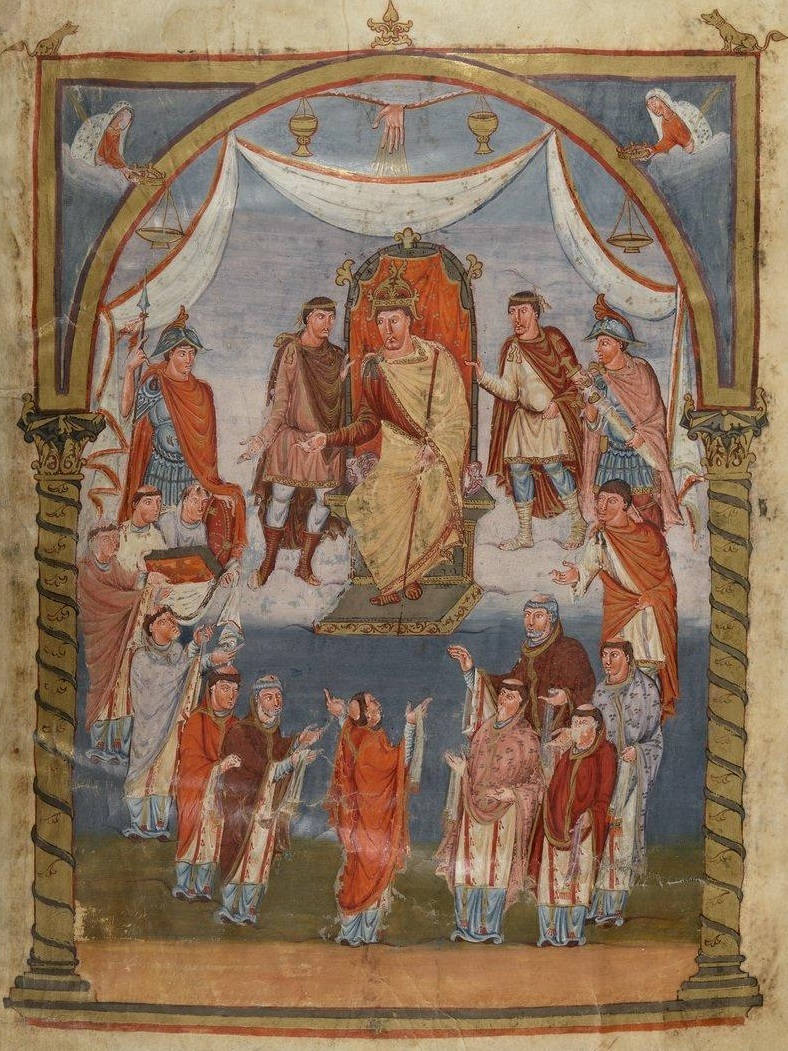
Monks of the Abbey of Tours presenting a Bible to King Charles the Bald. Ninth century miniature.

Books were highly valued for their material worth. They were often given as gifts, inherited, or bequeathed. In the 9th century, it became common for monks to present rulers with books, usually the Bible, which is depicted in many book miniatures from that time. In return, kings and nobles would grant abbeys expensive and lavishly decorated codices, as well as special funds to maintain the books. Emperor Charlemagne gave the monks of Saint-Denis a forest. The proceeds were used by the brothers to make new bindings for their manuscripts. The abbots of Saint Wandrille donated dozens of books to their monastery, which was appropriately recorded in the monastery chronicle. The abbots at Saint Gall, Bobbio, and Saint Emmeram also followed this practice. It was common among secular clergy to bequeath private libraries to monasteries.

Monasteries and church pulpits typically had a scriptorium, where manuscripts were produced and some remained on site. The scriptoria were in constant contact with each other, exchanging not only manuscripts but also scribes. Scriptorium staff and scholars often copied books for their own use. Brother Reginbert of Reichenau, one of the famous Carolingian bibliophiles, copied dozens of volumes for himself in this way and later bequeathed them to his native monastery. Abbot Lupus Servatus of Ferrières personally copied dozens of codices for himself and his disciples, including the works of Suetonius. However, personal libraries of intellectuals were rare exceptions. Conversely, the clergy required a large amount of 'working' literature, such as the Gospels, which were essential for worship, homiliaria, antiphonaries, Psalms, collections of sermons, hagiographies, resolutions of councils, and more. These books were in high demand and required numerous copies, making them the primary output of the scriptoriums, where they were copied to order. Customers included private individuals, such as Eberhard of Friuli. It is also known that in the 9th century, Count Conrad commissioned one of the Loir scriptoriums to transcribe the "History of Alexander the Great" by Quintus Curtius Rufus, as recorded in the dedication.

The temporary transfer of manuscripts was primarily characteristic of church libraries due to the cost of obtaining them. In the 8th to 10th centuries, hundreds of manuscripts circulated actively not only within local monastic or ecclesiastical communities, but also over a much wider area. Thus the monks of Saint Gall temporarily gave their books to Reichenau, and the brothers of Saint Vaast gave them to Beauvais. The reverse process also took place: neighbouring monasteries collaborated to restore the libraries of those that had been destroyed by fire or raid. For instance, the Normans completely plundered the Abbey of St Maximine of Trier in 882, resulting in the destruction of its considerable book collection. However, a few decades later, the monastery began to receive manuscripts from various centres in Lorraine and the northern part of the West Francia, such as Metz, Tours, Saint-Amand, Laon, and Mainz. By 1125, Saint Maximine's library contained 150 manuscripts, only a small portion of which were produced in the monastery scriptorium.

Control over the circulation of books in the monastic or ecclesiastical community was ineffective, resulting in the frequent loss or theft of manuscripts. At least five Lorsche codices from the 9th to 10th centuries contain appeals to the reader to return the manuscript to the monastery. The codex of the Antiquities of the Jews, copied at Lorsch in the early 9th century, includes a note indicating that it was issued to Fulda Abbey and safely returned. The "Life of Charlemagne" by Einhard appears in the Lorsch catalogue of 830, but it is no longer present in the three lists compiled before 860. The same fate befell 12 other manuscripts of the Lorsch monastery.

== Book storage ==
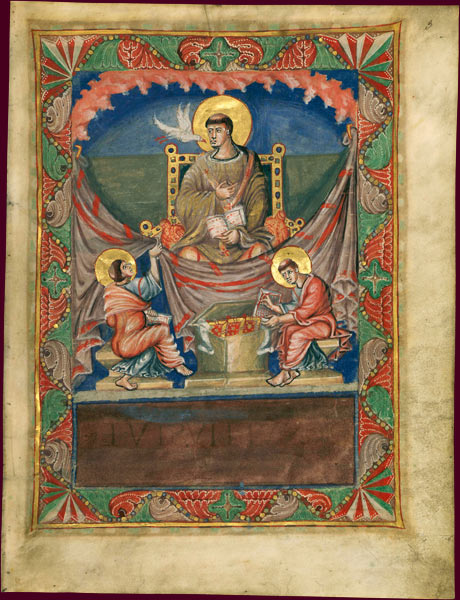
Miniature from the Sacramentary of Charles the Bald. Around 869-870.

Manuscript storage conditions during the early Middle Ages were often suboptimal. Libraries, as we know them today (with catalogues, reading rooms and microclimate book repositories), did not exist. Instead, small book collections, consisting of only a few copies, were kept in armoires or stone niches in the church or chapter house. Carolingian book miniatures provide insight into the use of chests for storing books. The armory was typically a rectangular wooden box with a lockable lid (keyholes are clearly visible in the drawings). The codices were stored horizontally in a chest, with the spines facing upwards, allowing for the storage of five or six books simultaneously without damage. This is attested by Rabanus Moor (De universum XXII, 8). The miniatures in the Reims' Gospel depict a round box for the scrolls, similar in appearance to a modern hatbox. Various types of manuscript receptacles can be seen in miniatures depicting evangelists at work. As a rule, the boxes of books stand at the scribe's feet or under his chair or lectern, as can be seen in the miniature from the sacramentary of Charles the Bald.

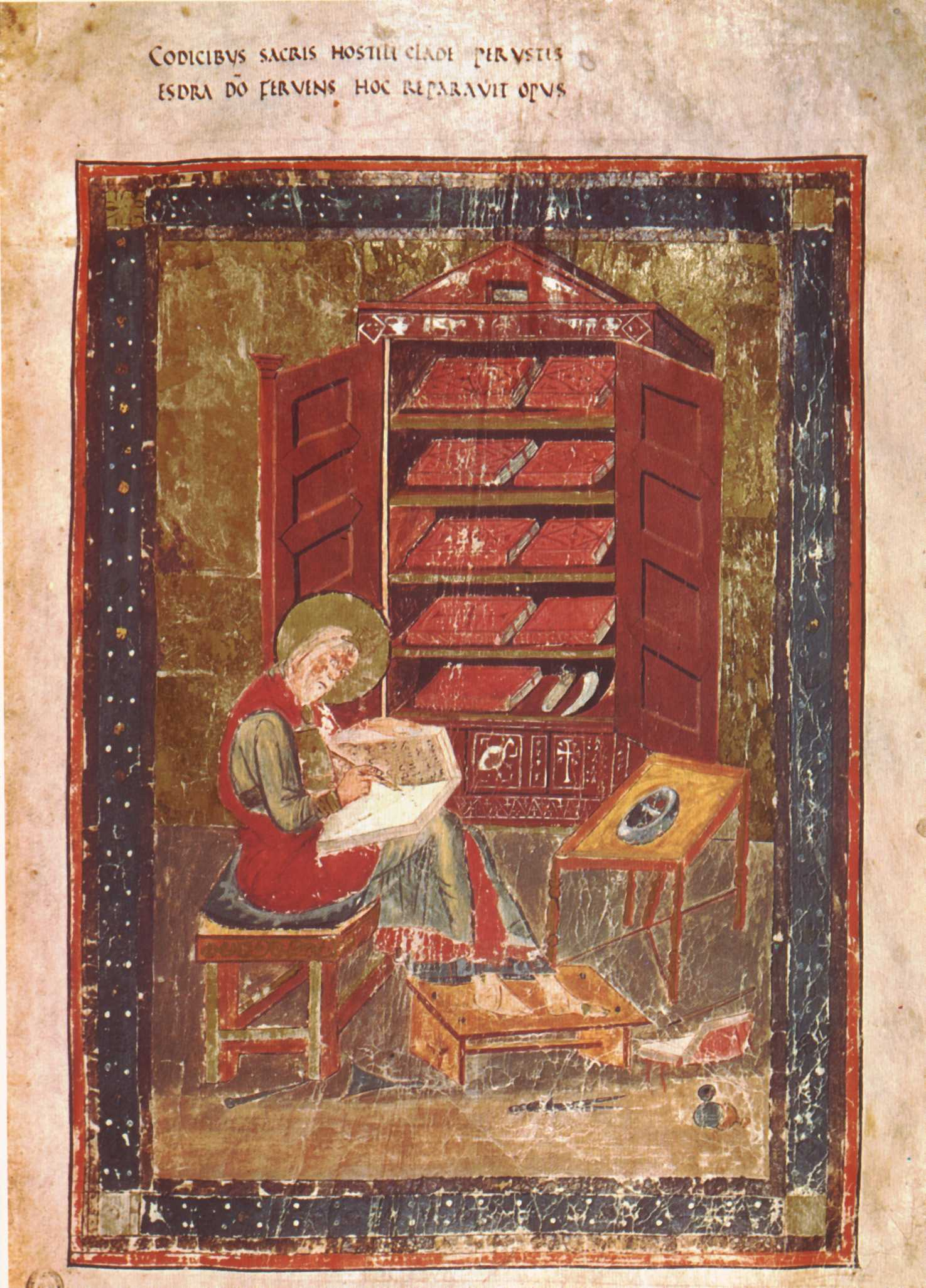
Miniature on fol. 5 of the Amiatine Codex, depicting Ezra as a monk scribe. The caption at the top reads, "When the sacred books were lost in the fire of war, Ezra made amends"

The bookcase does not appear in Carolingian iconography, but it does appear in the 8th-century Anglo-Saxon Codex Amiatinus. The miniature shows a two-winged cabinet, slightly more than a man's height, with five shelves containing books and writing implements. Characteristically, the manuscripts in the cabinet are not standing, but lying, two on each shelf, spines facing the viewer. In the miniature there are 9 books in the armory, and the tenth is in the hands of the scribe (characteristically, there are no desks, the manuscript is copied on the scribe's knee). We know from written sources that there were also large cabinets capable of containing dozens of books. For example, the catalogue of the Montier-en-Der monastery of 993 mentions that 23 manuscripts were found in the "chest" (in arca) of Abbot Adson when their owner went on a pilgrimage to Jerusalem and did not take them with him.

Large monastic book collections required special rooms, called cellula in the sources, which literally means "small room" or "small cell". In the plan of an ideal monastery from the time of Louis the Pious (around 820), there is a separate room for both the scriptorium and the library, the latter being located above the scriptorium. Both rooms are attached to the chancel of the church by the northern wall of the eastern choir. On the south side there was a two-storey sacristy in a symmetrical annex. According to A.I. Sidorov:

The immediate proximity of both buildings to the altar emphasises their importance for the internal life of the monastery. However, this architectural decision had another, quite pragmatic reason. On the one hand, the windows of the scriptorium, facing north, never received sunlight, and thus the room where the scribes worked was able to achieve even and soft natural lighting. On the other hand, the library was located opposite the abbot's house and was therefore under his direct supervision at all times.

— Сидоров, Каролингские библиотеки: к вопросу о книжной культуре у франков, p. 68

In reality, manuscripts in the monasteries were often stored carelessly, in unsuitable rooms, and were subject to damage from dampness and rodents. Many 9th-century sources testify to the poor condition of the vast majority of books from earlier eras. However, the cellulae of the Carolingian era have not survived, and the oldest surviving medieval library room is located in the Cistercian abbey of Flaran (Gascony), dating from the mid-12th century. The room had several niches, with enough space for chests, cupboards, and possibly shelves. It is connected to the monastery church, sacristy, and chapter room by walls, with no windows present. The fourth wall faces the cloister.

Not all manuscripts were stored in the same location. Books intended for religious purposes were kept separately, directly in the church, along with vestments and utensils. Educational books were also kept in the monastery or church school room. It was only in the 12th century that separate rooms for libraries became common practice in Europe, as evidenced by the nomenclature of book lists-catalogues and ownership inscriptions on the manuscripts themselves. "Whereas in the ninth and tenth centuries it was indicated that a manuscript belonged to such and such a monastery, church, or person, the rule now became to use the formula liber de armario."

== Book handling and reading ==
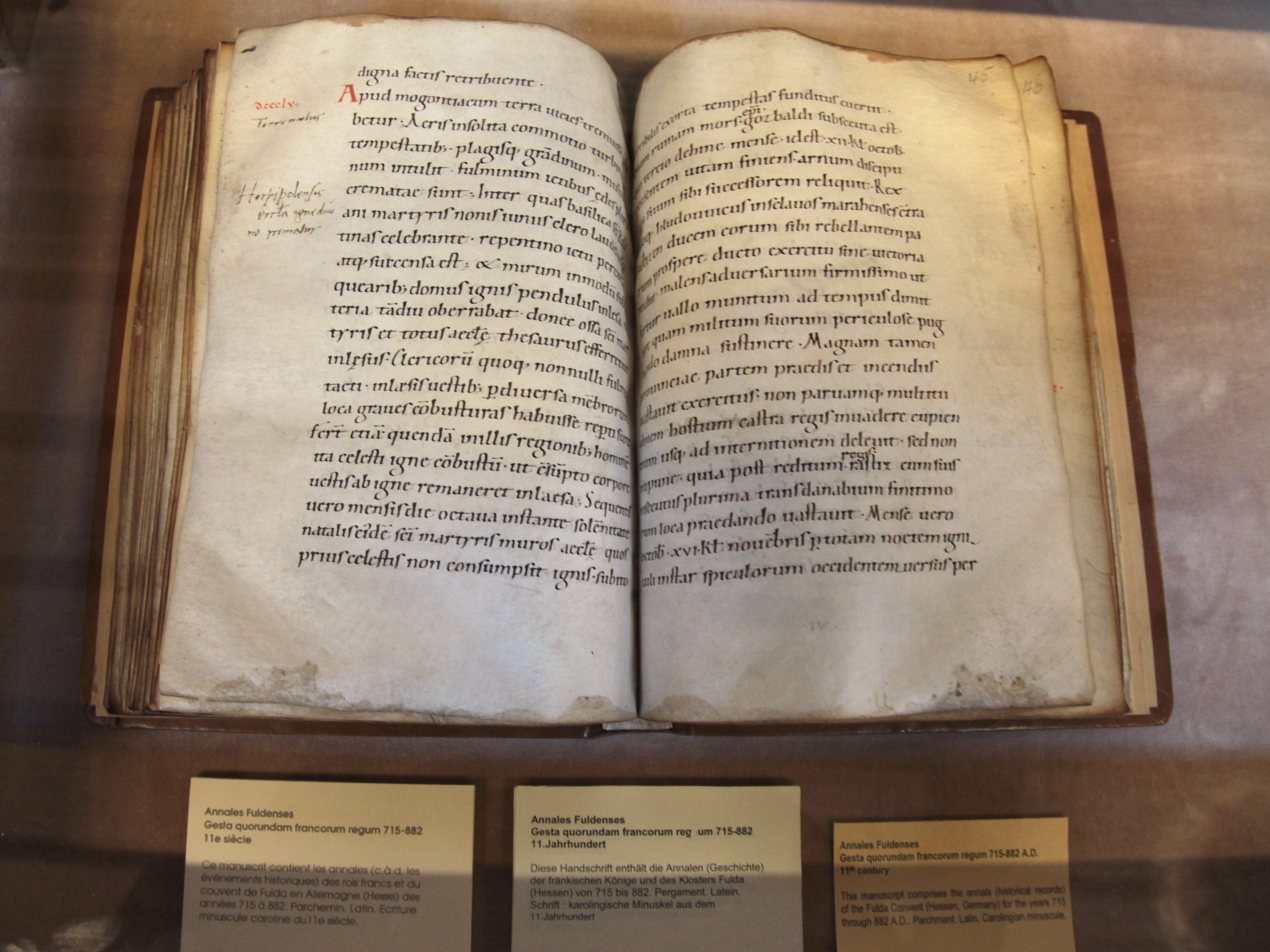
Annales Fuldenses

Monastic libraries were primarily accessible to the monks of a particular abbey, and were often isolated from the outside world. However, some books were occasionally loaned to a friendly bishop, presbyter or abbot of another monastery, just as manuscripts from the church library were in the possession of the monks. In some cases, books were also loaned to laymen closely associated with a particular abbey.

In Carolingian monasteries, one of the brothers was responsible for preserving books. However, it is unclear when the position of 'librarian' arose, how widespread it was, what it was called, or whether it was considered a special position. Nevertheless, Raban Mawr's poetry reveals that this person had access to the keys of the "small room" and the chests (Hrabani Mauri Carmina, 23). The book depository was solely for storage and not for reading books, even if it was a small cell. In some monasteries, such as Saint Gall, the scriptorium was used as a reading room. At certain hours, three monks could read manuscripts in the scriptorium under the supervision of the eldest monk when no work was being done there. It was possible to read within the cloister on benches along the walls of the gallery as well. Sometimes, the part of the room adjacent to the church was also converted for reading.

The reading order was determined by the Rule of Saint Benedict. Between Easter and the October calends, it was permitted to read from the fourth to the sixth hour, and from the October calends to Great Lent, to the second hour. During Great Lent, it was permitted to read from the morning until the end of the third hour. During this period, a monk could be given a book for advanced study. After a year, he was obliged to return the book and pass an examination on what he had read. If the individual's knowledge was deemed satisfactory, they would receive a new book. However, if they failed to pass the certification, they would have to continue studying the previous manuscript. This order only applied to compulsory works, which were recorded in the yearly breviaries. 'Non-obligatory' works, such as those on history, were likely only given for a short period of time and were not included in the breviary. Monks and priests utilised their personal libraries much more freely.

== Bibliography ==
- Сидоров, А.И. (2011). "Каролингские библиотеки: к вопросу о книжной культуре у франков" (PDF). Люди и тексты: Исторические источники в социальном измерении (in Russian). Moscow: Ин-т всеобщей истории РАН: 55–84. ISBN 978-5-94067-342-2.
- Becker, G. (1885). Catalogi bibliothecarum antiqui (in Latin). Bonnae: apud M.Cohen et filium (Fr.Cohen). p. 329.
- Bullough, D. (2003). "Charlemagne's court library revisited" (PDF). Early Medieval Europe. 12 (4): 339–363. doi:10.1111/j.0963-9462.2004.00141.x.
