= Candidus (fl. 793–802) =

Candidus was the name given to the Anglo-Saxon Wizo or Witto by Alcuin, whose scholar he was and with whom he went in 782 to Gaul. He is author of several philosophical texts wrongly attributed by earlier scholars to the benedictinian monk Brun Candidus of Fulda, the author of the vita of Abott Eigil of Fulda. But recent research into the manuscript tradition furnishing clear evidence attested the authorship of Candidus Wizo, the learned disciple of Alcuin. Based on his deep knowledge of the works of Saint Augustine of Hippo he tried to give proof of god's existence, to demonstrate that the incorporeal nature of god is conceivable only by means of the spiritual eye and excludes any possibility of viewing him by means of the corporeal eyes, and to elucidate the problem of the incarnation explaining its need by the weakness of the human cognition. At the palace school he was tutor to Gisla, the sister, and Rodtruda, the daughter of Charlemagne. When Alcuin went to Tours (796), Candidus was his successor as master of the palace school. Alcuin's esteem for Candidus is shown by his dedicating his commentary on Ecclesiastes to his friends Onias, Fredegisus, and Candidus.

== Works ==
- Dicta Candidi (Ineichen-Eder 1978, pp. 195–197, Nr. 9–12; 21–28; 30; Marenbon 1981, pp. 152–166; Dolbeau 1997)
- Dicta de imagine dei. (Migne, Patrologia Latina 101, cols. 1359–1360; Ernst Dümmler, in: Monumenta Germaniae Historica Epistolae 5, pp. 615–616)
- Opusculum de passione Domini (Migne, Patrologia Latina 106, cols. 57–104)
- Epistola num Christus corporeis oculis deum videre potuerit (Migne Patrologia Latina 106, cols. 103-108; Ernst Dümmler, in: Monumenta Germaniae Historica Epistolae 4, pp. 557–561)
- Sermones (inedita; cf. Jones 2005).

== Bibliography ==
- Revue des études juives, Société des études juives (France), 1955.
- Bernhard Blumenkranz, Juifs et chrétiens dans le monde occidental, 2006, p. 272.
- François Dolbeau, Le Liber XXI sententiarum (CPL 373). Édition d’un texte de travail, in: Recherches augustiniennes 30, 1997, pp. 113–65.
- Christine E. Ineichen-Eder, Theologisches und philosophisches Lehrmaterial aus dem Alkuinkreise, in: Deutsches Archiv für Erforschung des Mittelalters 34, 1978, pp. 192–201.
- Christine E. Ineichen-Eder, Künstlerische und literarische Tätigkeit des Brun Candidus von Fulda, in: Fuldaer Geschichtsblätter 56, 1980, pp. 201–217, esp. pp. 205–209.
- Christine E. Ineichen-Eder, The Authenticity of the "Dicta Candidi", "Dicta Albini" and Some Related Texts, in: Michael Herren (Ed.), Insular Latin Studies. Papers on Latin Texts and Manuscripts of the British Isles: 500–1066. Toronto 1981, pp. 179–193.
- Christine E. Ineichen-Eder, Candidus Nr. 5, in: Lexikon des Mittelalters, vol. 2, 1983, cols. 1432–1433.
- Christopher A. Jones, "The Sermons Attributed to Candidus Wizo". In: Katherine O’Brien O’Keeffe, Andy Orchard (Eds.): Latin Learning and English Lore: Studies in Anglo-Sa xon Literature for Michael Lapidge, vols. 1–2, Toronto 2005, vol. 1, pp. 260–83.
- Christopher A. Jones, CANDIDUS (WIZO, WITTO, WITHSO, *HWITTA), in: Bede.net.
- John Marenbon, From the Circle of Alcuin to the School of Auxerre: Logic, Theology and Philosophy in the Early Middle Ages (Cambridge Studies in Medieval Life and Thought 3rd ser. 15), Cambridge 1981.
- Heinz Löwe, Zur Geschichte Wizos, in: Deutsches Archiv für Geschichte des Mittelalters 6, 1943, pp. 363–373
- John Marenbon, "Alcuin, the Council of Frankfort and the Beginnings of Medieval Philosophy". In: Rainer Berndt (Ed.), Das Frankfurter Konzil von 794. Kristallisationspunkt Karolingischer Kultur (Quellen und Abhandlungen zur Mittelrheinischen Kirchengeschichte 80. Mainz), vols. 1–2, Mainz 1997, vol. 2, pp. 603–615.
