= Thioto of Fulda =

Thioto's name at the end of a list of abbots of Fulda in one of the Annales necrologici. Each name is followed by the day of death in red ink.

Thioto (died 7 August 871) was the abbot of Fulda from 856 to 869. According to the Annals of Fulda, he was "ordained by the election of the monks and the authority" of King Louis the German to succeed to Hatto.

In 859, King Louis sent Thioto as his ambassador to the Emperor Louis II of Italy and Pope Nicholas I in order to justify Louis's invasion of West Francia the previous year. According to the Annals, Thioto "was able to clear the king's name by giving a reasoned explanation of what had happened". He brought back a letter of pardon from the pope, meeting Louis near Lake Constance, where the king gave him leave to return to Fulda.

Some correspondence of Thioto was included in a now lost collection of letters from Fulda. This collection is known only from the much later Magdeburg Centuries. In 864, Thioto wrote asking Pope Nicholas to protect his "close relative" Albuin, who had accidentally injured Charles the Young, one of the sons of King Charles of West Francia. The letter was carried by Abbot Eigil of Flavigny. In addition, a letter written by all the monks of Fulda to King Louis requested his protection for Albuin, who had fled to East Francia. An echo of Thioto's role in this affair may be found in the 13th-century chanson de geste Huon of Bordeaux. Another letter summarized by the Magdeburg Centuries was addressed by Thioto to Archbishop Tado of Milan, celebrating the friendship between their predecessors, Hatto and Angilbert II.

In 869, Louis removed Thioto as abbot, replacing him with Sigihard. The Annals of Hildesheim that report this do not specify the cause. The timing and the actions of Sigihard immediately after his arranged election in May suggest that Thioto was deposed for supporting the pope's creation of an archbishopric of Moravia over Louis's objections.

Thioto probably retired to a nearby separate cell after his deposition, as all other ex-abbots of Fulda did. He died on 7 August 871. He was seemingly buried near the body of Saint Boniface in the eastern ambulatory of the old abbey church, which now lies beneath Fulda Cathedral.

== Bibliography ==
- Allen, Bethany Hope (2007). The Annals of Hildesheim (MA thesis). University of New Hampshire.
- Bigott, Boris (2002). Ludwig der Deutsche und die Reichskirche im ostfränkischen Reich (826–876). Matthiesen Verlag.
- Goldberg, Eric J. (2006). Struggle for Empire: Kingship and Conflict under Louis the German, 817–876. Cornell University Press.
- Goldberg, Eric J. (2021). "'A Man of Notable Good Looks Disfigured by a Cruel Wound': The Forest Misadventure of Charles the Young of Aquitaine (864) in History and Legend". In Rutger Kramer; Helmut Reimitz; Graeme Ward (eds.). Historiography and Identity III: Carolingian Approaches. Brepols. pp. 355–386. doi:10.1484/M.CELAMA-EB.5.120170.
- Raaijmakers, Janneke (2012). The Making of the Monastic Community of Fulda, c. 744–c. 900. Cambridge University Press.
- Reuter, Timothy, ed. (1992). The Annals of Fulda. Manchester University Press.
- Tessera, Miriam Rita (2022). "A Fragmentary Story: Episcopal Culture in Milan during Lothar I's Reign?". In Gianmarco De Angelis; Francesco Veronese (eds.). Networks of Bishops, Networks of Texts: Manuscripts, Legal Cultures, Tools of Government in Carolingian Italy at the Time of Lothar I. Firenze University Press. pp. 33–65. doi:10.36253/978-88-5518-623-0.04.
