= Princely Abbey of Fulda =

Benedictine abbey and ecclesiastical principality centered on Fulda, Germany

Coordinates: 50.554°N 9.67175°E

Princely Abbey; Prince-Bishopric of Fulda Fürstabtei - Fürstbistum Fulda
- 1221–1802
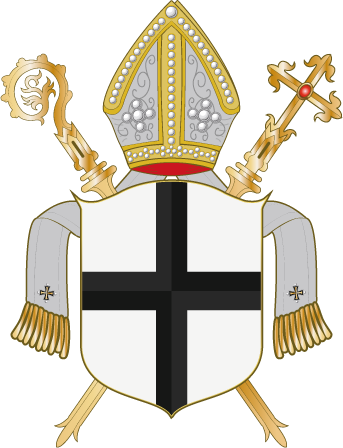
- Flag Coat of arms

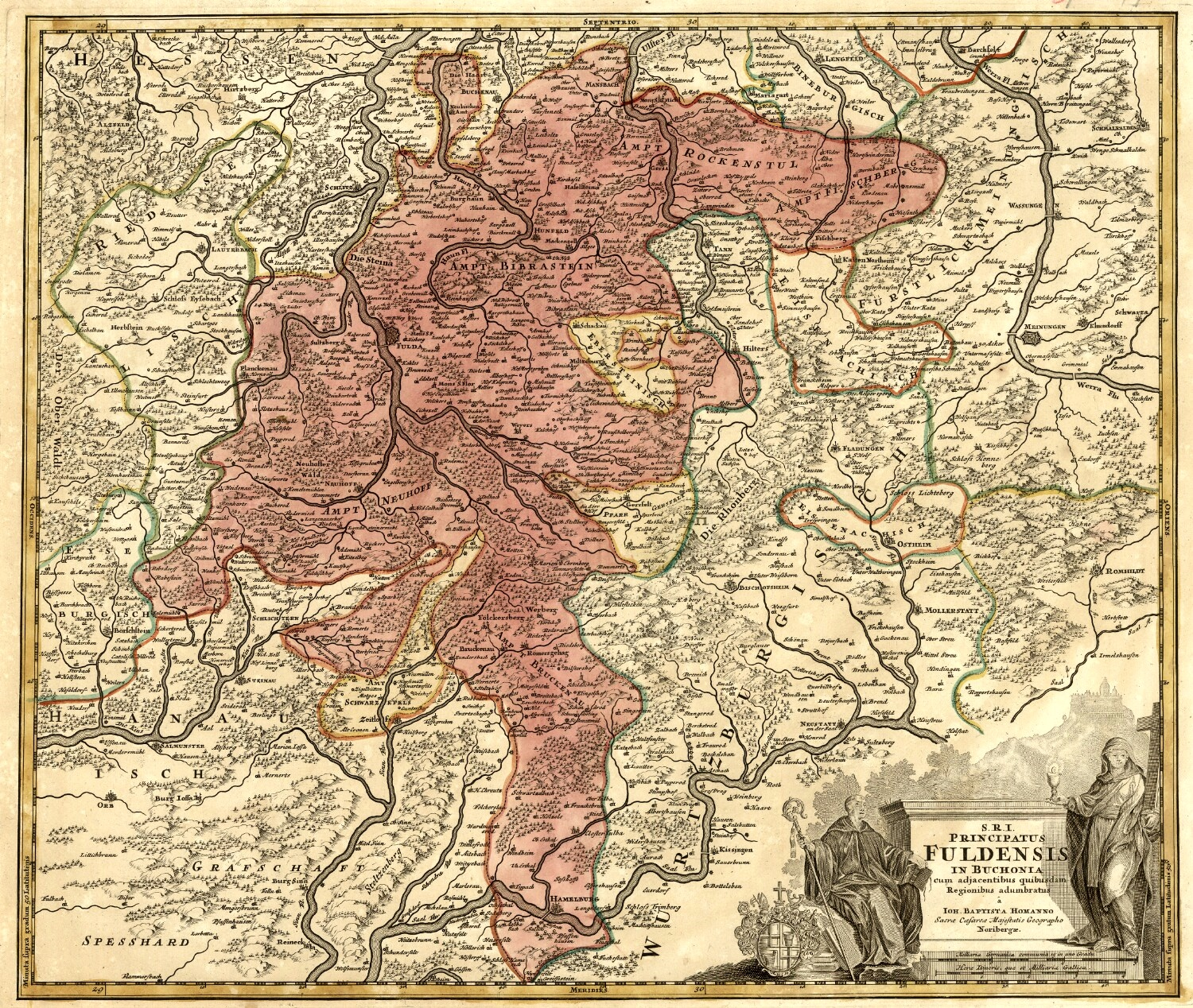
- Territory of the Princely Abbey of Fulda in the early 18th century

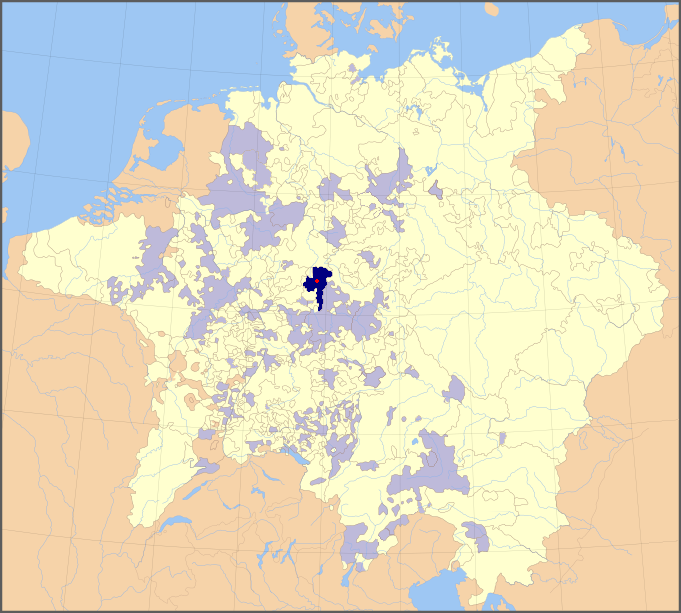
- Location of Fulda and its territory in the Holy Roman Empire (1648)
- Status: Princely Abbey
- Capital: Fulda
- Common languages: Hessian
- Government: Elective principality
- Historical era: Middle Ages; Early modern period
  - Founded: 744
  - Imperial immediacy: 1221
  - Joined Upper Rhenish Circle: 1500
  - Elevated to Prince-Bishopric: 1752
  - Mediatised to Nassau-Orange: 1802
Preceded by	Succeeded by
Rhenish Franconia	Principality of Nassau-Orange-Fulda
- Today part of: Germany

The Abbey of Fulda (German: Kloster Fulda; Latin: Abbatia Fuldensis), from 1221 the Princely Abbey of Fulda (Fürstabtei Fulda) and from 1752 the Prince-Bishopric of Fulda (Fürstbistum Fulda), was a Benedictine abbey and ecclesiastical principality centered on Fulda, in the present-day German state of Hesse.

The monastery was founded in 744 by Saint Sturm, a disciple of Saint Boniface. After Boniface was buried at Fulda, it became a prominent center of learning and culture in Germany, and a site of religious significance and pilgrimage through the 8th and 9th centuries. The Annals of Fulda, one of the most important sources for the history of the Carolingian Empire in the 9th century, were written there. In 1221 the abbey was granted an imperial estate to rule and the abbots were thereafter princes of the Holy Roman Empire. In 1356, Emperor Charles IV bestowed the title "Archchancellor of the Empress" (Erzkanzler der Kaiserin) on the prince-abbot. The growth in population around Fulda resulted in its elevation to a prince-bishopric in the second half of the 18th century.

Although the abbey was dissolved in 1802 and its principality was secularized in 1803, the diocese of Fulda continues to exist.

== History ==
=== Carolingian period ===
In the mid-8th century, Saint Boniface commissioned Saint Sturm to establish a larger church than any other founded by Boniface. In January 744, Saint Sturm selected an unpopulated plot along the Fulda River, and shortly after obtained rights to the land. The foundation of the monastery dates to March 12, 744. Sturm travelled to notable monasteries of Italy, such as that of Monte Cassino, for inspiration in creating a monastery of such grand size and splendor. Boniface was proud of Fulda, and he obtained autonomy for the monastery from the bishops of the area by appealing to Pope Zachary for placement directly under the Holy See in 751. Boniface was entombed at Fulda following his martyrdom in 754 in Frisia, as per his request, creating a destination for pilgrimage in Germany and increasing its holy significance. Saint Sturm was named the first abbot of the newly established monastery, and led Fulda through a period of rapid growth.

The monks of Fulda practiced many specialized trades, and much production took place in the monastery. Production of manuscripts increased the size of the library of Fulda, while skilled craftsmen produced many goods that made the monastery a financially wealthy establishment. As Fulda grew, members of the monastery moved from the main building and established villages in the outlying territories to connect with non-monastery members. They established themselves based on trade and agriculture, while still remaining connected to the monastery. Together, the monks of Fulda created a substantial library, financially stable production, and an effective centre for education. In 774, Carloman placed Fulda under his direct control to ensure its continued success. Fulda was becoming an important cultural center to the Carolingian Empire, and Carloman hoped to ensure the continued salvation of his population through the religious activity of Fulda.

The school at the Fulda monastery became a major focus of the monks under Sturm's successor, Abbot Baugulf, at the turn of the century. It contained an inner school for Christian studies, and an outer school for secular, including pupils who were not necessarily members of the monastery. During Boniface's lifetime he had sent the teachers of Fulda to apprentice under notable scholars in Franconia, Bavaria, and Thuringia, who returned with knowledge and texts of the sciences, literature, and theology. In 787 Charlemagne praised Fulda as a model school for others, leading by example in educating the public in secular and ecclesiastical matters.

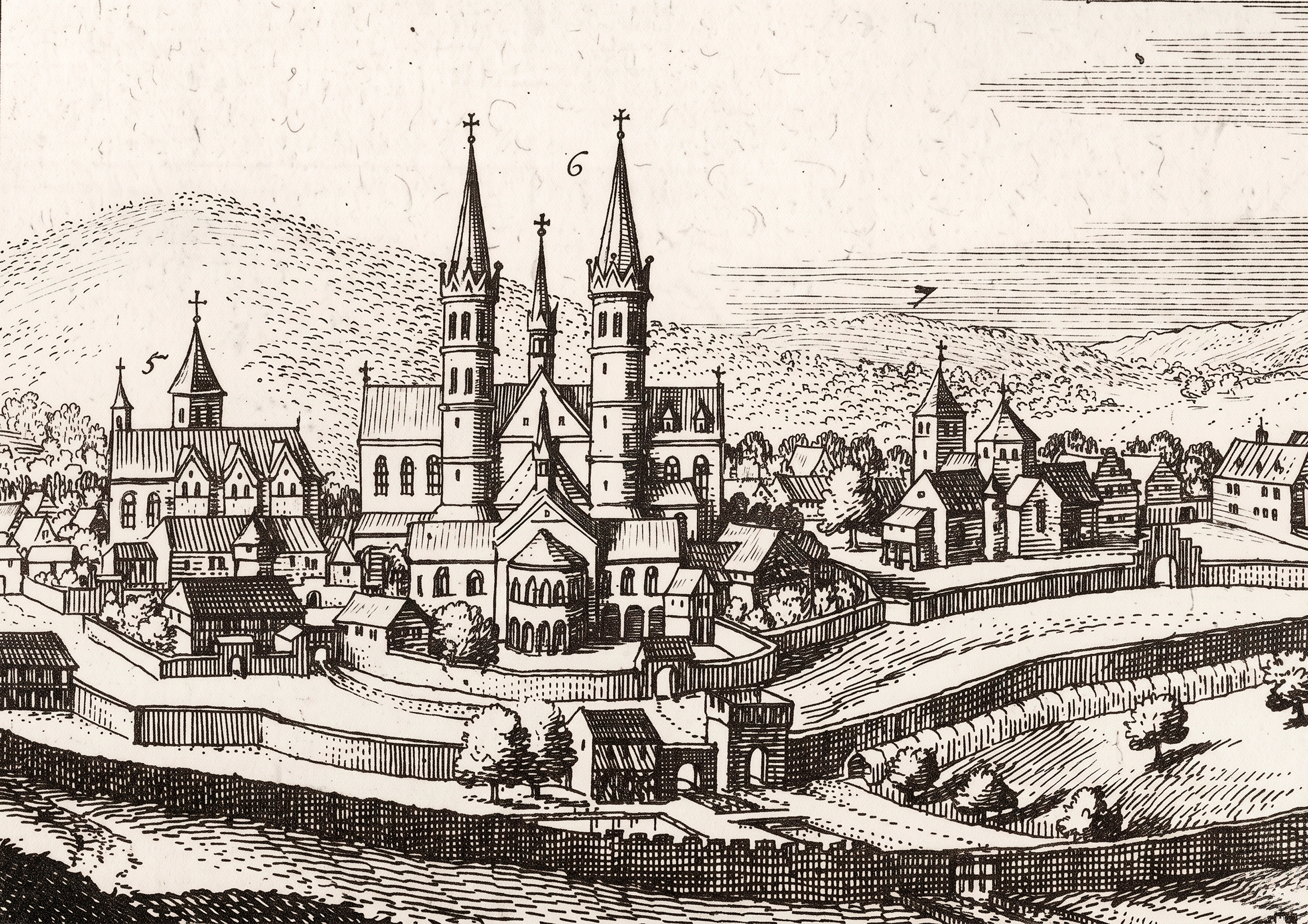
View of the ancient abbey of Fulda

Around the year 807, an epidemic claimed much of Fulda's population. During this time, the third abbot of Fulda, Ratgar, was carrying out construction on a new church started by Baugulf. According to the "Supplex Libellus", an account of Fulda's history written by the monks, Ratgar was overzealous, exiling monks opposed to the excessive attention being given to the new church, and punishing those attempting to flee the epidemic that was spreading amongst the population. This prompted a discussion in Fulda as to how the monastery was to be properly run, and the nature of the responsibilities of the monks.

Until this point, a focus of the monks had been remembering and recording the lives of the deceased, specifically those who were members of the Fulda monastery, in what was known as the "Annales Necrologici". They sang psalms for their dead to ensure their eternal salvation. Under Ratgar, the focus of the monastery had shifted to that of construction and arbitrary regulation; monks were being exiled for questionable reasons, or punished in seemingly unjust ways. Another matter of concern included who was permitted into the inner monastery; Ratgar was at the time hosting a criminal in the living quarters. The concept of private and public property was also in contention. With the land of Fulda expanding, the monks desired all property to be public rather than create a contention for private land, while Ratgar opposed this perspective. The "Supplex Libellus" also attempted to address the issue of the growing secular responsibilities of the monastery. As the school grew and the communities around Fulda expanded, the monastery was feeling the strain of balancing ecclesiastical obligations with its newfound secular prominence. The monks were successful in their grievances against Ratgar, and Louis the Pious sympathized with them. Agreeing that Ratgar's plans were too ambitions for Fulda, and his punishments too extensive, he exiled Ratgar from Fulda in 817, and Eigil became the fourth Abbot of Fulda. In July 820, Louis granted a villa to the monastery.

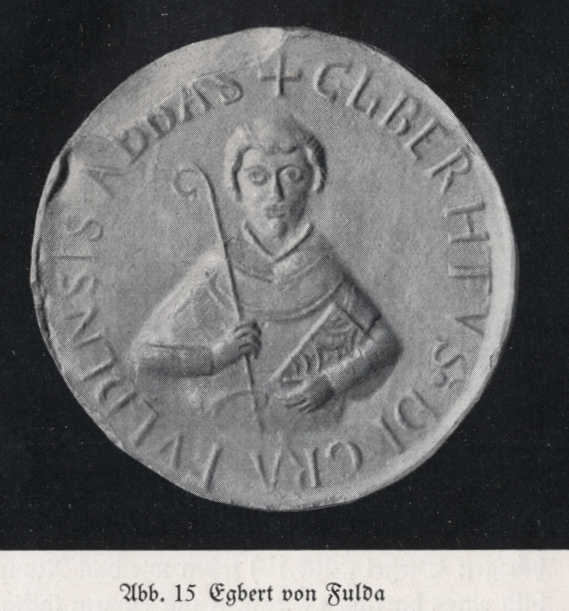
Seal of Abbot Egbert of Fulda (1047–1058)

Under Abbot Eigil's leadership, construction of the new church continued at a more moderate pace. He sought to stylize the church after St. Peter's in Rome, adding a notable western transept in the same fashion. The transept was a new architectural style, and in mimicking it, Fulda demonstrated their support to the papacy through tribute. This unique architectural tie, as well as the growing intellectual importance of Fulda, created strong ties with the Roman papacy. Coupled with the tomb of Saint Boniface, Fulda attracted much religious pilgrimage and worship, a site of great significance.

In 822, Rabanus Maurus became the fifth abbot of Fulda. He was previously educated at the monastery, and was very academically inclined, becoming both a teacher and head-master at the school before becoming abbot. Understanding the importance of education, the school became the main focus of Fulda under his leadership, and he led Fulda to the height of its importance and success. He established separate departments for the school, including those for sciences, theological studies, and the arts. Rabanus made an effort to collect various additional holy relics and manuscripts of historical significance to Fulda and the surrounding the areas to fortify their prominence in the Frankish Empire. With each relic, the significance of Fulda grew, and more gifts and power were bestowed upon the abbey. Power was, however, not Rabanus's only intent; the increased holiness of the lands also served to bring his monks and pilgrims closer to God. The collection accumulated under Rabanus was largely lost during the looting of Fulda by the Hessians during the Thirty Years' War.

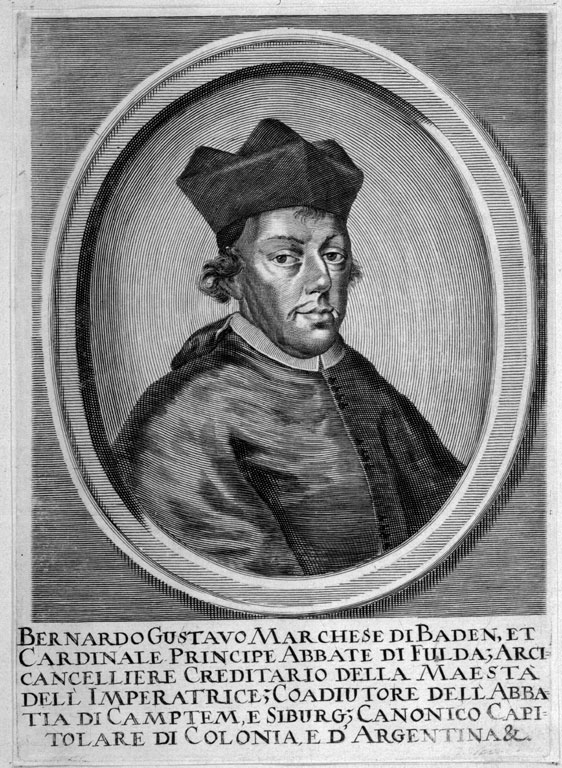
Prince-Abbot Bernhard Gustav von Baden-Durlach (1671–1677)

=== Imperial principality ===
Succeeding abbots carried the monastery down the same path, with Fulda retaining a place of prominence in the German territories. With the decline of the Carolingian rule, Fulda lost its security and relied increasingly on patronage from independent sources. The abbot of Fulda held the position of primate over all Benedictine monasteries in Germany for several centuries. From 1221 and onwards, the abbots also served as Princes of the Holy Roman Empire, given this rank by Emperor Frederick II of Hohenstaufen, and resulted in increased secular as well as monastic obligations. The increased importance of Fulda resulted in much patronage and wealth; as a result, the wealthy and noble eventually made up the majority of the abbey's population. The wealthy monks used their positions for their own means, going as far as to attempt to turn monastic lands into their own private property. This caused great unrest by the 14th century, and Count Johann con Ziegenhain led an insurrection, alongside other citizens of Fulda, against Prince-Abbot Heinrich VI, 55th abbot of the monastery. The combination of responsibilities to the empire and corruption of traditional monastic ideals, so highly valued by Boniface and the early abbots, placed great strain on the monastery and its school.

In the later Middle Ages, a dean of the monastic school functionally replaced the abbot concerning scholastic management, once more granting it relative independence concerning ecclesiastical functions of Fulda. However, the monastery (and surrounding city) would never regain its status as a great cultural center it once held during the early medieval years. The monastery was dissolved in 1802. The ecclesiastical principality was secularized in 1803 after the Reichsdeputationshauptschluss, but the episcopal see continued.

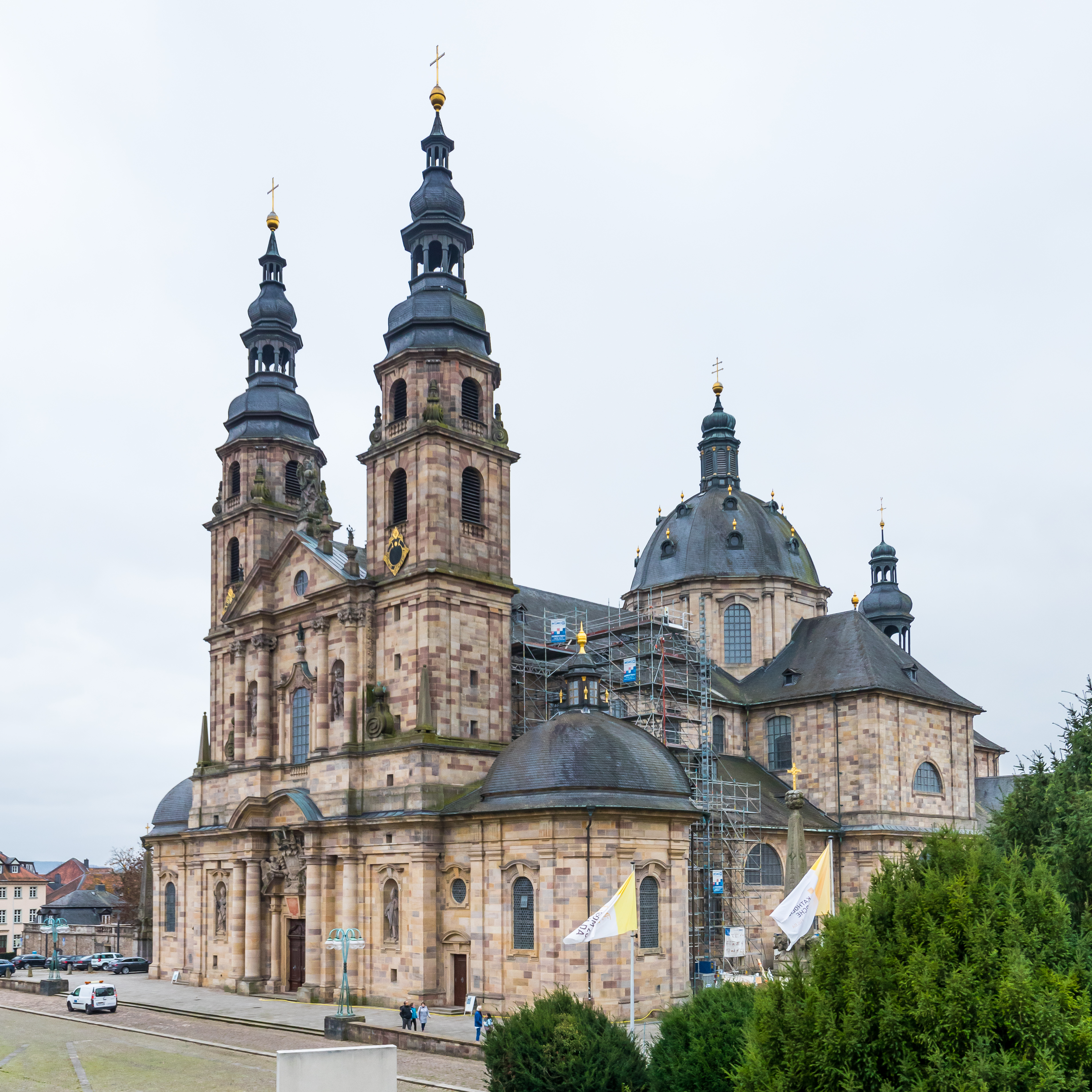
Fulda Cathedral (the former abbey) today

The secular territory of Fulda was joined the Principality of Orange-Nassau along with several other mediatized lands to form the Principality of Nassau-Orange-Fulda. Prince William Frederick refused to join the Confederation of the Rhine and, following the dissolution of the Holy Roman Empire in August 1806, fled to Berlin. Fulda was taken over by the French. In 1810 it was given to the Grand Duchy of Frankfurt, but was occupied by Austria from 1813 and by Prussia from 1815. the Congress of Vienna resurrected it as the Grand Duchy of Fulda and gave it to the Electorate of Hesse in 1815.

== Library and scriptorium ==
The library held approximately 2000 manuscripts. It preserved works such as Tacitus' Annales, Ammianus Marcellinus' Res gestae, and the Codex Fuldensis which has the reputation of serving as the cradle of Old High German literature. It was probably here that an Italian book-hunter in 1417 discovered the last surviving manuscript of Lucretius's De Rerum Natura, which then became enormously influential in humanist circles. Its abundant records are conserved in the state archives at Marburg. As of 2013 the Fulda manuscripts have become widely dispersed; some have found their way to the Vatican Library.

A notable work that the monks of Fulda produced was the "Annales necrologici", a list of all the deceased members of the abbey following the death of Saint Sturm in 744. The monks offered prayer for the dead listed in the Annales to ensure their eternal salvation. While at first this record only contained the names of those at Fulda, as the power and prominence of Fulda grew, so too did the scope of who was to be included in the Annales. Patrons, citizens, and nobles of the area all came to be recorded in this piece of Fulda and its concept of community. The documenting of dates of passing, beginning with Sturm, created a sense of continuity and a reference for the passage of time for the monks of Fulda.

== List of rulers ==
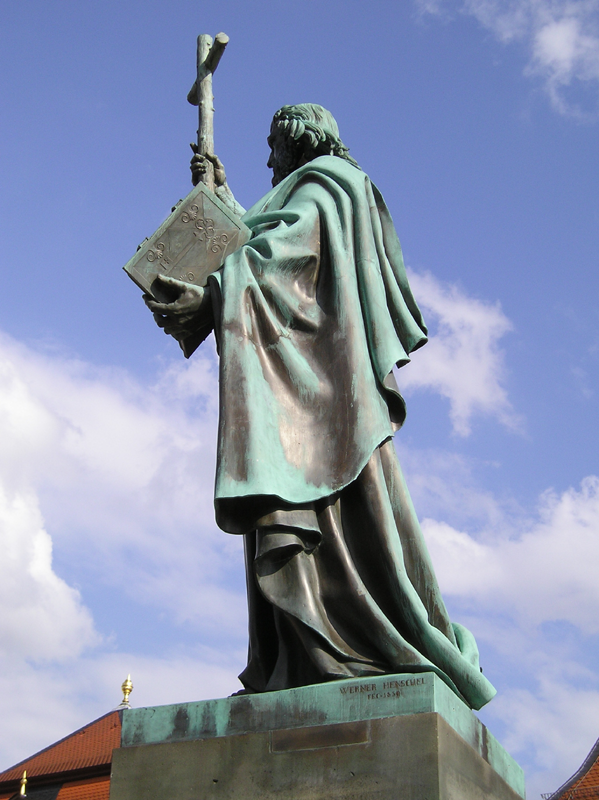
Statue of Saint Boniface (1830) at Fulda, Germany

=== Abbots ===
- Saint Sturm 744-779
- Baugulf 779-802
- Ratgar 802-817
- Eigil 818-822
- Rabanus Maurus 822-842
- Hatto I. 842-856
- Thioto 856-869
- Sigihart 869-891
- Huoggi 891-915
- Helmfried 915-916
- Haicho 917-923
- Hiltibert 923-927
- Hadamar 927-956
- Hatto II. 956-968
- Werinheri 968-982
- Branthoh I. 982-991
- Hatto III. 991-997
- Erkanbald 997–1011
- Branthoh II. 1011–1013
- Poppo 1013–1018, also Abbot of Lorsch (Franconian Babenberger)
- Richard 1018–1039
- Sigiwart 1039–1043
- Rohing 1043–1047
- Egbert 1047–1058
- Siegfried von Eppenstein 1058–1060, also Archbishop of Mainz
- Widerad von Eppenstein 1060–1075
- Ruothart 1075–1096
- Godefrid 1096–1109
- Wolfhelm 1109–1114
- Erlolf von Bergholz 1114–1122
- Ulrich von Kemnaten 1122–1126
- Heinrich I. von Kemnaten 1126–1132
- Bertho I. von Schlitz 1132–1134
- Konrad I. 1134–1140
- Aleholf 1140–1148
- Rugger I. 1148
- Heinrich II. von Bingarten 1148–1149
- Markward I. 1150–1165
- Gernot von Fulda 1165
- Hermann 1165–1168
- Burchard Graf von Nürings 1168–1176
- Rugger II. 1176–1177
- Konrad II. 1177–1192
- Heinrich III. von Kronberg im Taunus 1192–1216
- Hartmann I. 1216–1217
- Kuno 1217–1221

=== Prince-Abbots ===
- Konrad III. von Malkes 1221–1249
- Heinrich IV. von Erthal 1249–1261
- Bertho II. von Leibolz 1261–1271
- Bertho III. von Mackenzell 1271–1272
- Bertho IV. von Biembach 1273–1286
- Markward II. von Bickenbach 1286–1288
- Heinrich V. Graf von Weilnau 1288–1313
- Eberhard von Rotenstein 1313–1315
- Heinrich VI. von Hohenberg 1315–1353
- Heinrich VII. von Kranlucken 1353–1372
- Konrad IV. Graf von Hanau 1372–1383
- Friedrich I. von Romrod 1383–1395
- Johann I. von Merlau 1395–1440
- Hermann II. von Buchenau 1440–1449
- Reinhard Graf von Weilnau 1449–1472
- Johann II. Graf von Henneberg-Schleusingen 1472–1513
- Hartmann II. Burggraf von Kirchberg 1513–1521/29
- Johann III. Graf von Henneberg-Schleusingen 1521/29–1541
- Philipp Schenk zu Schweinsberg 1541–1550
- Wolfgang Dietrich von Eusigheim 1550–1558
- Wolfgang Schutzbar (named Milchling) 1558–1567
- Philipp Georg Schenk zu Schweinsberg 1567–1568
- Wilhelm Hartmann von Klauer zu Wohra 1568–1570
- Balthasar von Dernbach, 1570–1606 (exiled 1576–1602)
  - Julius Echter von Mespelbrunn, Bishop of Würzburg, administrator 1576–1602
- Johann Friedrich von Schwalbach 1606–1622
- Johann Bernhard Schenk zu Schweinsberg 1623–1632
- Johann Adolf von Hoheneck 1633–1635
- Hermann Georg von Neuhof (named Ley) 1635–1644
- Joachim Graf von Gravenegg 1644–1671
- Cardinal Gustav Adolf (Baden) (Bernhard Gustav Markgraf von Baden-Durlach) 1671–1677
- Placidus von Droste 1678–1700
- Adalbert I. von Schleifras 1700–1714
- Konstantin von Buttlar 1714–1726
- Adolphus von Dalberg 1726–1737
- Amand von Buseck, 1737–1756, Prince-Bishop after 1752

=== Prince-Bishops/Prince-Abbots ===
Painting of Prince-Bishop, Prince Abbot Heinrich von Bibra by his court painter, Johann Andreas Herrlein

- Adalbert II. von Walderdorff 1757–1759
- Heinrich VIII. von Bibra, 1759–1788
- Adalbert von Harstall, 1789–1802, remained bishop until 1814

== Sources ==
- Bernhardt, John W. (1987). "Servitium Regis and Monastic Property in Early Medieval Germany". Viator Medieval & Renaissance Studies. 18: 53–88.
