= Eigil of Fulda =

Abbot of Fulda (c. 750–822)

Eigil (also called Aeigil or Egil) (c. 750–822) was the fourth abbot of Fulda. He was the nephew and biographer of the abbey's founder and first abbot Saint Sturm. We know about Eigil primarily from the Latin Life (Vita Aegili) that the monk and teacher of Fulda, Candidus Bruun composed about him after his death.

Eigil's parents, who were nobles of Norica, sent him to the abbey of Fulda (still Under Sturm's rule) for his education. Sturm died in 779 and was succeeded by Baugulf.

The next abbot, Ratgar, with his excessive severity, caused deep divisions in the monastery. In 811, monks from Fulda, possibly including Eigil, petitioned Emperor Charlemagne to remove the abbot. Finally, in 817, Ratgar was denounced by the monks. Charlemagne's son and successor, Louis the Pious, banished Ratgar and sent two of his delegates, Aaron and Adalfrid, along with their associates to reform the abbey according to proper monastic discipline. Eigil was elected in 818, and, says Candidus, brought harmony to the monastery once again. In a poem, his student and successor Hrabanus Maurus celebrated his clemency and gentleness, supporting Candidus' positive portrait.

Under Eigil, several building projects were dedicated at Fulda. In 819, the Archbishop Haistolf came to Fulda to dedicate the Basilica of Saint Boniface (who was considered a co-founder of the abbey, with his disciple Sturm), and Boniface's holy relics - his bones - were translated (that is, conveyed in a public religious ceremony) to the new Basilica.

Eigil died in 822 and was succeeded by the head teacher of Fulda's school, Hrabanus Maurus, one of his former pupils. Candidus' Vita treats Eigil as a saint, but other writers, such as Hrabanus do not.

== Works ==
Eigil wrote a Life of Saint Sturm, who was a disciple of Saint Boniface as well as the founder, in 742 or 744, and first abbot of the abbey of Fulda (747-779).

== Bibliography ==
- Candidus Bruun. Vita Aeigili, liber II (= vita metrica). In E. Duemmeler, ed. Monumenta Germaniae Historica Poetae Latini Aevi Carolini Vol. II. Berlin, 1884, pp. 94–117.
- Gereon Becht-Jördens. "Vita Aegil abbatis Fuldenis a Candido ad Modestum edita prosa et versibus. Ein Opus geminum des IX. Jahrhunderts. Einleitung und kritische Edition" (phil. Diss. Heidelberg), Marburg (Selbstverlag) 1994.
- Gereon Becht-Jördens. Die Vita Aegil abbatis Fuldensis des Brun Candidus. Ein opus geminum aus dem Zeitalter der anianischen Reform in biblisch figuralem Hintergrundstil. Frankfurt am Main 1992 (ISBN 3-7820-0649-6).
- Gereon Becht-Jördens. "Die Vita Aegil des Brun Candidus als Quelle zu Fragen aus der Geschichte Fuldas im Zeitalter der anianischen Reform." In Hessisches Jahrbuch für Landesgeschichte 42 (1992), pp. 19–48.
- Christine Ineichen-Eder. "Künstlerische und literarische Tätigkeit des Candidus-Brun von Fulda." In Fuldaer Geschichtsblätter 56, 1980, p. 201-217 (without notes but with illustrations of considerable value also in Winfrid Böhne (Ed.). Hrabanus Maurus und seine Schule. Festschrift der Rabanus-Maurus-Schule 1980. Fulda 1980, p. 182-192.
- Pius Engelbert (1968), Die Vita Sturmi des Eigil von Fulda: Literarkritisch-historische Untersuchung und Edition
- Chr. Browerus, Vita Sancti Stumi Primi Abbatis Fuldensis, in Sidera Germaniae (Mainz, 161:6), pp. 5–24. The critical edition is found in Monumenta Germaniae Historica, Scriptores, vol. II, pp. 366–77.

== See also ==
Abbey of Fulda

- Raban Maur
- Candidus Bruun of Fulda
- Sturm of Fulda
- Ratgar of Fulda
