= Baugulf =

German abbot

Baugulf (died 8 July 815) was a prominent Benedictine abbot in the Carolingian church. He was the second abbot of the Abbey of Fulda in present-day Germany. He served from 779 to 802 CE and was succeeded by Ratgar.

Despite his contemporary prominence, the twenty-three years of his abbacy can now only be understood through letters - including the famous Epistola de litteris colendis ('Letter on the cultivation of learning') or through the use of charters recording exchange of property that can aid our understand of the monastery's relations with the outside world under his abbacy. Baugulf also commissioned a list of monks (the so-called 'Baugulf list') that help us understand life within the Abbacy. Additionally a list exists of books held in their abbey library and its dependent cellae, these along with the few remains of the church that began construction while he was abbot can give us clues into the course of his abbacy.

== Life ==
Baugulf was part of the royal aristocratic elite being a member of a noble family that owned property south of the Main in east Francia. It is likely that he was raised and trained in Fulda. There are claims that he may be Count Baugulf of the Speyergau, a trusted follower of first Pippin and later his son Charlemagne, who had been active in the court since the 750s. However it is more likely that they were different members of the same significant aristocratic family. Baugulf's brother also joined the church becoming the Bishop Erkanbert von Minden.

== Abbacy of Fulda ==
Baugulf was elected by the monks of Fulda to be the new abbot after the death of the previous abbot Sturmi in 779. Baugulf used his aristocratic and political connections to further strengthen the abby's social and economic position. Under his abbacy the area from which the monastery drew its property and recruits extended from the Middle Rhine valley to the Frankish region north of the Middle and Upper Main. In 781, the king granted the monastery the campus of Hünfeld and its surrounding woods 30 km to the north-east of Fulda. Charlemagne furthermore confirmed the conveyance of the mark Rasdorfand the neighboring mark Soisdorf near Hünfeld to Fulda, both former royal properties. The king also granted the monastery two important royal estates in the Middle Rhine valley and the region just to its north, one in Dienheim to the south of Mainz, and one in Echzell

Shortly after taking office as the Abbot Baugulf ordered the creation of a list of all monks living in Fulda and its dependent cellae beginning between November 781 and the beginning of January 782 and totaling 364 in all.

These lists (with analysis of the names and origins of the monks alongside an incomplete record of books the abbey had access to) suggest that Baugulf busied himself to position Fulda firmly in the outside world, as a royal abbey with strong ties with local landowners, and as a center of holy learning and prayer. These ambitions were also reflected in the new abbey church that was built under his supervision.

In 791 Baugulf commissioned Ratgar (a highly skilled architect who would go on to replace Baugulf in his role as abbot after he resigned from the position in 802) to build a new abbey church. Baugulf resigned as abbot before the church was finished and moved to Wolfsmünster, a cella which he had founded 50 km south of Fulda. The monks then chose Ratgar, the architect, to run their convent. Ratger added a transept to the west of the church. The Gesta abbatum, written in the early tenth century, recounts the order of events as follows: "With honour he [Baugulf] built a sanctuary in the east that admirably was constructed through the efforts of the very energetic man Ratger … Shortly after having accepted the position [of abbot] the third abbot, Ratger, the wise architect, has connected the western sanctuary with the other and has made one church [that was] of miraculous artistry and immense magnitude."

There has been some debate over Baugulf's reasoning in replacing the previous abbey church. However recent studies have shown that the original church was not as large as first imagined and that the increased size of the community of Fulda (counting at least 364 members in the early 780s, as the Baugulf list shows) meant that, whilst the majority lived outside the mother convent residing instead in Fulda's dependent houses they would have visited the mother convent on special occasions. On important feast days, monks, prominent churchmen and lay people from the region gathered in Fulda to participate in the festivities. Pilgrims also frequented the shrines of the saints within the church including Boniface who had become increasingly popular as Fulda's patron saint. This meant that the church was probably no longer big enough to accommodate the monks and visitors who came to Fulda to celebrate liturgical feasts or to honor the saints.

== Thuringian rebellion ==
In 785 Hardrad, a Thuringian aristocrat, and some of his fellows revolted against the king. The reasons behind this revolt are complex but likely involved increased commitment from the Thuringian aristocrats and the expansion of Carolingian style churches. Hardrad was a member of the Eastern Frankish aristocracy with extensive land assets who may have had family ties to Baugulf. This may explain why, once the plot was discovered the Thuringians fled to Fulda claiming they were seeking the protection of St Boniface who was buried there. Baugulf mediated on their behalf arranging them safe passage. However Charlemagne had them blinded and exiled.

The account of their flight, written down close to the event by a scribe in the Annales Nazariani demonstrated St Boniface's fame along with boosting the profile of the Abby and this event may well have helped to inspire Baugulf to further develop the martyr's cult in a new church. This expansion would give Boniface a more prominent position and increase the Abby's capacity. In the same period Baugulf also asked Alcuin to write a mass for Boniface and possibly placed an altar on the martyr's grave furthering the idea that the thuringian rebellion coincided with an increase in the cult of St Boniface.

== Retirement ==
It is widely believed that a short, seemingly insignificant record in the Annales Fuldenses in fact refers to a major conflict between Baugulf and the abbey community that in the end forced his withdraw from office. The evidence for this proposition is a letter written by Alcuin between 801 and 802 to the monks of Fulda, which could be read as a plea of reconciliation by Alcuin on behalf of his friend Baugulf. In this letter, Alcuin asked the monks not to condemn their abbot, who due to his illness could not bear the severity of monastic life. Instead of rebuking him for his failures, they should obey and love him like a father, for he enabled the monks to lead a regular life in all quietness. Moreover, it was not their call to judge him. After all, the abbot would have to justify his conduct before God at the Last Judgement. Alcuin continued his plea for concord with a brief treatise on the relations between the senior members of the community and the young monks, and ended with a reference to the votive masses he had written for the monastic community

Alcuin's letters were generally very broad with careful selection of passages and teachings relevant to the recipient generally drawing heavily on scripture. In his letter to the monks of Fulda he was uncharacteristically explicit and candid referring directly to a specific problem that troubled that particular community at that time: the sick Baugulf, who due to his illness did not necessarily live up to the rule of Benedict. This departure from form may indicate that this was Alcuin giving his opinion on debate within the Frankish church on what the nature of what the role of abbot was and what their duties involved.

== Legacy ==
Candidus Brun (a Monk and priest at Fulda) was commanded to write the Vita Baugulf (a record of the life of Baugulf) by Eigil of Fulda the forth Abbot of Fulda sometime prior to 822 but this has not survived.
