= Peter of Pisa =

Italian grammarian, deacon and poet

Peter of Pisa (Latin: Petrus Pisanus; Italian: Pietro da Pisa; 744 – 799 AD), also known as Petrus Grammaticus, was an Italian grammarian, deacon and poet in the Early Middle Ages. In 776, after Charlemagne's conquest of the Lombard Kingdom, Peter was summoned to the Carolingian court along with Paul the Deacon and Alcuin. Peter had originally taught at Pavia, in Italy. Peter of Pisa was asked to be Charlemagne’s primary Latin teacher. Peter’s poetry provides a personal look at the workings of the innermost sanctum surrounding Charlemagne. Peter’s grammar texts provide insight into the transformation Latin education underwent in this period.

As Christianity spread through Europe, so did Latin. Native speakers of Celtic or Germanic languages were rapidly becoming exposed to Latin: the language of the Church and international communication. In West Europe, from 400 until the Late Middle Ages, the Bible and its commentaries were only available in Latin. Although some regions in West Europe were introduced to Latin centuries earlier by the Romans, these spoken languages evolved differently from the Latin of the written Bible. To properly understand the Bible, and its commentaries, and the works of figures such as St. Augustine, knowledge of written Latin was a must. East of the Rhine, the people spoke an ancestor to today's German language because the Roman Empire did not stretch that far. Learning Latin was challenging to peoples who were often not literate in their own native language. Another problem was posed by the inadequacy of the (outdated) teaching material that was available to instructors and missionaries. The materials were often designed for more advanced, native Latin speakers, or possibly Roman students. An example of this could be the Ars Maior by Donatus. Younger clergy in, for instance, Frankia or Germania, could see the study of Latin as a better way to understand the Bible, its commentaries, and prayers.

The Late Imperial teaching manuals are broken down into three categories:

• Schulgrammatik was a systemic work that introduced pupils to basic concepts of the language such as parts of speech.

• Commentary: a type of work whose focus was originally written texts. Donatus’ efforts widened this genre to the study of grammar.

• Regulae works displayed variety in structure, with the main focus on form and proper Latin inflection.

A common theme of these works is that they were not written for education of inexperienced Latin learners. In the 600s, three new types of teaching manuals began to emerge that shaped the way Latin was taught during the time of the Carolingians:

• Commentaries. These manuals were intended for advanced students with one of the goals being to see grammatical texts as literary commentaries.

• Declinationes Nominum. Generally speaking, the goal in these texts was to construct the answer text by choosing from a vocabulary “bank”.

• Insular Elementary Grammars.

Christian culture was not introduced by the Carolingians; this movement was already evident in Visigothic Spain and Anglo-Saxon England at the time of conversion in the 7th century. Annexation of the Lombard kingdom (774) is also possibly linked with encouraging Charlemagne to embrace late Roman tradition. Classical studies began to be encouraged by him. Education was revived and Latinity began to rise. “The greatest contribution made by the Carolingian rulers to the revival of learning in their territories was thus less in legislating for it than in guaranteeing the Church’s enjoyment of requisite material resources in the face of various conflicting interests and pressures.” “The Carolingian renaissance may be seen as an exercise in patronage on a grand scale by the Carolingian rulers.” "Carolingian Military successes against groups like the Saxons and the Avars allowed the territory to gain wealth which was donated to the Church." Therefore, strengthening the presence of standardized written Latin language knowledge in Francia.

Around the year 800, Charlemagne (768-814) invited many great poets, grammarians, and other intellectuals to his court to feed his interest in the liberal arts. His influence and the ability to attract scholars to him created an influx. The Carolingian Renaissance spurred interest in classical study, and a revolution in teaching grammar and rhetoric. Classical and late-antique literature was being copied at an increased pace, and rare classical works were sought by Charlemagne. Paul the Deacon, Theodulf, Alcuin, Waldo of Reichenau, amongst others, joined Peter of Pisa at the emperor's side. Peter was formerly at the court of Desiderius. However, the famous names did not stay at Charlemagne's court for a long period of time, and their relatively brief cohesiveness was the result of shared scholarly culture. Paulinus and Paul the Deacon were the first to leave no later than 790.

According to the emperor's biographer, Einhard, Peter of Pisa was Charlemagne's Latin grammar instructor. Peter's grammars largely incorporate the Insular Elementary style, while at the same time including distinct Carolingian aspects. One method which would become known by historians as distinctly the product of Peter is using series of questioning statements about the nature of a particular word. This type of method would remain in use for centuries for education purposes:

What is it?

What word class does it belong to?

Priscian is also known for including statements such as these in his manuals. However, the earliest datable specimen occurs in Peter of Pisa's grammar. Some words encourage very straightforward “discussion”, while others are more flexible in the answers which are provided to the statements. Peter is also unique in his application of logic to elementary grammars.

By the end of the 8th century, Charlemagne's travel group has grown in number, and had become increasingly immobile. Poetry and poetic epistles provided entertainment on prolonged stoppages, as well as a way of competition between intellectuals. In addition, Latin poetry would become very popular in the 9th century. Almost all of those drawn to Charlemagne's court were poets in a way. In this environment, they were motivated by their new “elite” group and trying to overcome each other with wordplay and sly humor. The surviving record indicates that some rivalries were preserved as dramatized poetry. Peter was the emperor's amanuensis and wrote some mocking poems in his name. The following is an excerpt from a poem written by Peter, in the voice of Charlemagne, in ironical exaggeration of Paul's ability, and one of the first written manifestations of their rivalry:

He sent you, Paul, most learned of poets and bards,

to our back-water, as shining light with the various languages

you know, to quicken the sluggish to life by sowing fine seeds.

Paul replies in a way that downplays his ability and comically exalts Peter:

But lest it be said that I am an ignoramus in languages,

I shall repeat a few of the lines which were taught to me

as a boy; the rest have slipped my mind as old age weighs upon me.

One unique feature of Charlemagne court's writing, and Peter's, is “coterie poetry”. Poems of this genre would make use of inside jokes, secret nicknames, and other aspects that indicate the readers be in a certain close-knit social group. Peter wrote to Paul the Deacon again:

You, hold off from gnawing the good brother with your teeth,

Who never is seen to be angry by the king's court.

An additional example of this kind of poetry could be found in the messages sent between Paul the Deacon, Peter of Pisa, and Charlemagne between 782 and 786. The three exchange riddles and sly remarks poking fun at one-another. Some epitaphs and acrostic poems would even draw in other court goers that were not part of the original dialogue, increasing the attractiveness of poetry for all court participants.

In addition, Peter wrote epistolary poems to Charlemagne, paying homage to him for building churches and acting as "father of his people".

Peter returned to Italy around 790, where he died no later than 799.

== See also ==
- Carolingian Renaissance
- Carolingian art
