= Saint Sturm =

Austrian saint

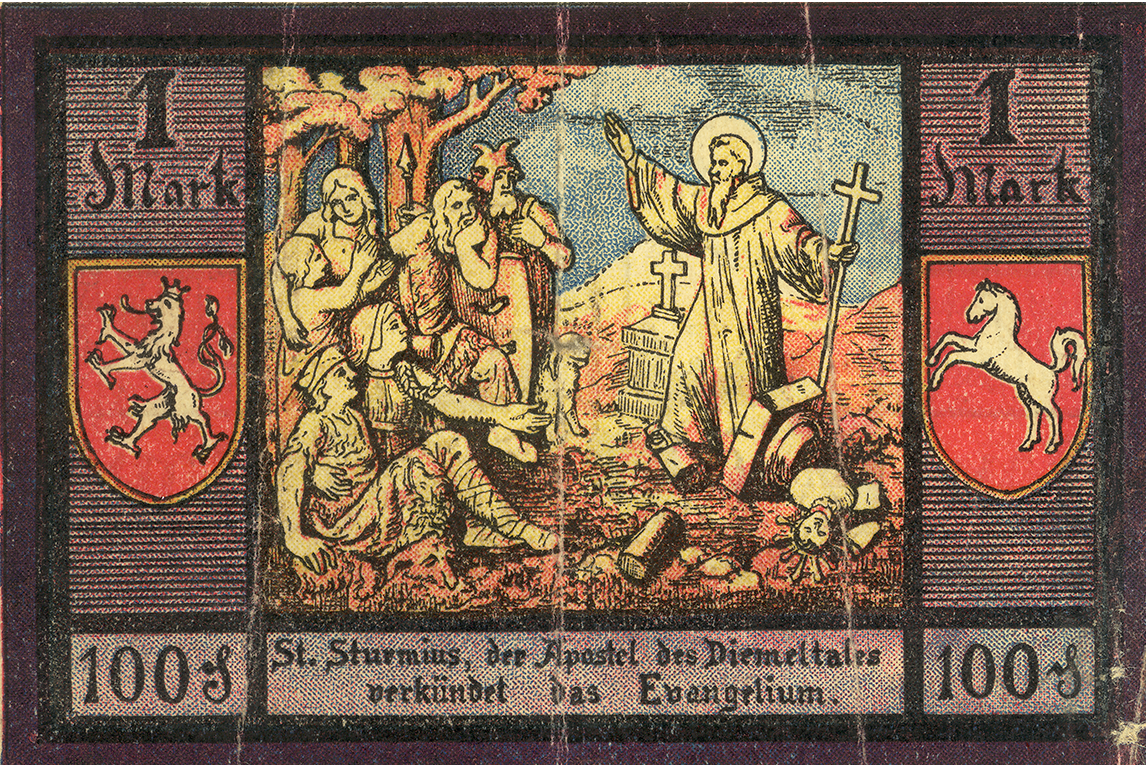

Abbot Apostle of the Saxons
- Born: c. 705; Lorch, March of Styria
- Died: 17 December 779; Fulda, Abbey of Fulda
- Venerated in: Catholic Church; Eastern Orthodoxy
- Canonized: 1139 by Pope Innocent II
- Feast: 17 December

Sturm (c. 705 – 17 December 779), also called Sturmius or Sturmi, was a disciple of Boniface and founder and first abbot of the Benedictine monastery and abbey of Fulda in 742 or 744. Sturm's tenure as abbot lasted from 747 until 779.

== Life ==
Sturm was born c. 705 in Lorch, Austria, and was most likely related to the Agilolfing dukes of Bavaria. His parents placed him under the care of Boniface, who was carrying out the church reorganization in Bavaria and Austria (founding the bishoprics of Salzburg, Regensburg and Würzburg). He was educated in the Benedictine monastery of Fritzlar by abbot Wigbert.

He was then active as a missionary in northern Hesse, where in 736 he established a monastic settlement in Haerulfisfeld (Hersfeld). Ordained in 740 as priest in Fritzlar. Boniface sent him to work for three years as a missionary in Westphalia. He then was a hermit at Hersfeld, until raiding Saxons drove him from his unprotected hermitage.

Sturm was instructed by Boniface in 744 to establish a monastery in the region of Eichloha, which had been granted to Boniface by the Frankish Mayor of the Palace Carloman. In the ruins of a 6th-century Merovingian royal camp, destroyed 50 years earlier by the Saxons, at a ford on the Fulda River, Sturm established the monastery and was named first abbot of Fulda by Boniface.

Around 748, Sturm and two other monks went to study Benedictine life as practiced at Monte Cassino and establish it at Fulda. They spent a year visiting Benedictine abbeys learning how the monks lived. Before returning to Fulda, Sturm met with Pope Zachary, who placed the monastery under the jurisdiction of the Vatican, rather than under the bishop. After the death of Boniface, this led to serious conflicts between Lullus, then archbishop of Mainz, and abbot Sturm. Nevertheless, Sturm prevailed over the bishops of Mainz and Utrecht in having Boniface, so-called Apostle of the Germans, buried in Fulda after his assassination in 754 near Dokkum in Frisia. This made Fulda a major place of pilgrimage for many peoples, including Anglo-Saxons, and brought much prestige and a stream of gifts and donations to Fulda.

Building on this success, Sturm was able to fend off efforts by the bishops of Mainz and Würzburg to invalidate the abbey's exemption. In 763, Lull convinced Pippin the Younger to banish Sturm from Fulda to Jumièges (Normandy). Lull named a new abbot, whom the monks refused to accept. Eventually, Lull allowed them to elect their own abbot and within two years they convinced Pepin to allow Sturm to return to Fulda. During his exile, he spent time with the common people of Germany, by the time he was rehabilitated, he had developed a much humbler demeanour, leading to him being known by the commoners as the "Quaint Saint".

In 774, the Abbey of Fulda received royal protection from Charlemagne. In the same year, Fulda was assigned missionary territories in heathen Saxony, thereby becoming a bridgehead in the Frankish political efforts to seize the Saxons' lands and forcibly impose Christianity on them. Sturm established the abbey of St. Boniface at Hamelin. When Charlemagne left the area to battle the Moors in Spain, the Saxons revolted and drove out the monks. In 779, he accompanied Charlemagne into Saxony, but fell ill and died soon after returning to Fulda on 17 December 779, where he was buried in the cathedral.

== Veneration ==
Sturm was recognised as a saint prior to the East–West Schism in 1054, hence the Orthodox Church continues to honour him. The post-1054 Roman Papacy did not accept all pre-Schism saints, sometimes reviewing their status. He was accordingly formally canonized in 1139 by Pope Innocent II. His life was recorded in the Vita Sturmi by the fourth abbot of Fulda, Eigil of Fulda (d. 822), a relative of his who had been a monk in Fulda for over 20 years under abbot Sturm.

Saint Sturm's Fountain is located in Fulda in front of the old town hall. It depicts Benedict, Boniface, and Sturm.
