= Ottonian Renaissance =

10th-century cultural and literary movement

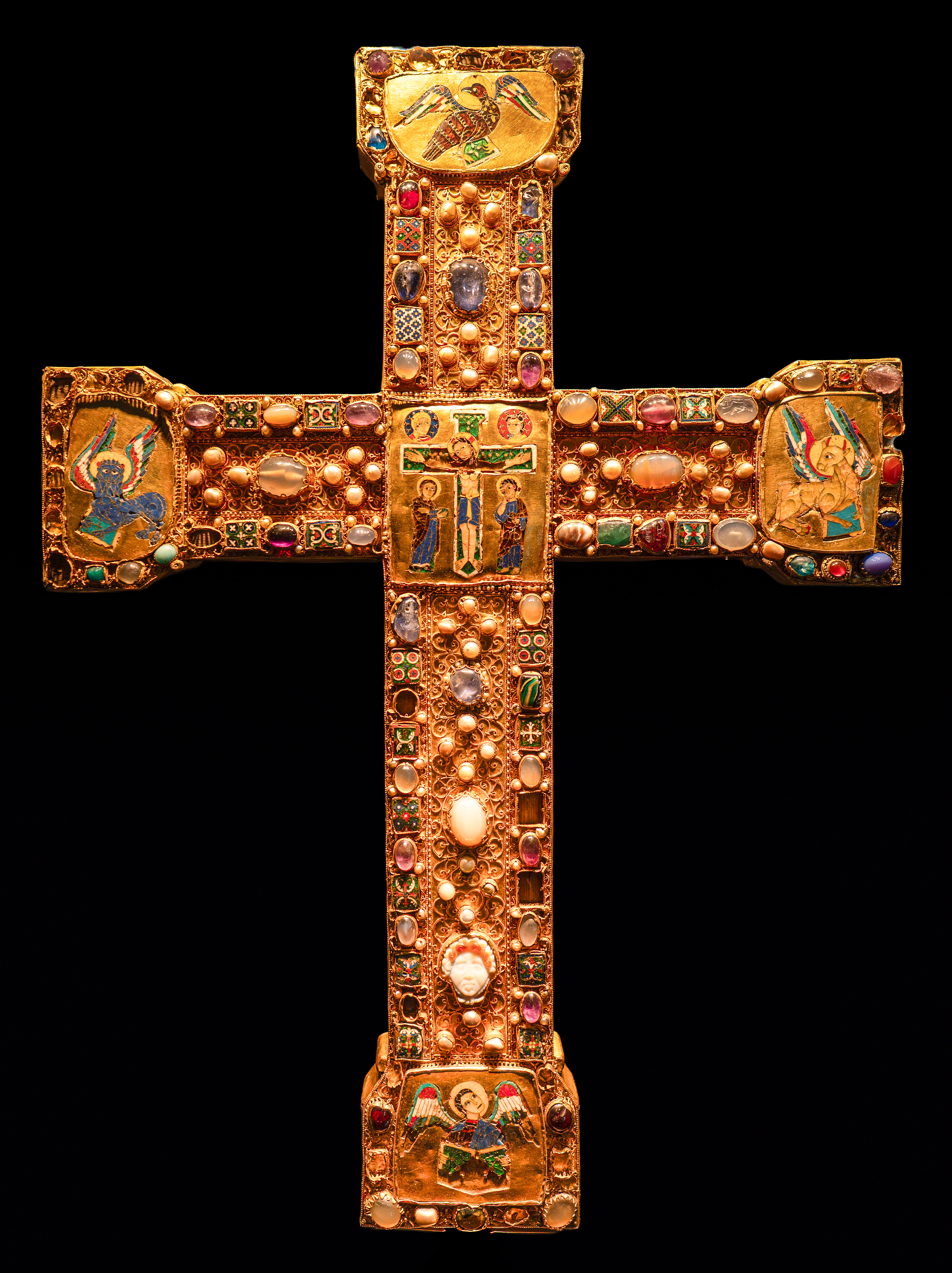
Enamel processional cross (Senkschmelzen-Kreuz), former Essen Abbey, c. 1000

The Ottonian Renaissance was a renaissance of Byzantine and Late Antique art in Central and Southern Europe that accompanied the reigns of the first three Holy Roman Emperors of the Ottonian (or Saxon) dynasty: Otto I (936–973), Otto II (973–983), and Otto III (983–1002), and which in large part depended upon their patronage. The leading figures in this movement were Pope Sylvester II and Abbo of Fleury. Renewed contact between the Ottonian court and Byzantine Constantinople spurred the hybridisation of the Eastern-Byzantine and Western-Latin cultures, particularly in arts, architecture and metalwork, while the Ottonians revitalised the cathedral school network which promoted learning based on the seven liberal arts. Ottonian intellectual activity was largely a continuation of Carolingian works, but circulated mainly in the cathedral schools and the courts of bishops (such as Liège, Cologne and Magdeburg), rather than the royal court.

== Historiography ==
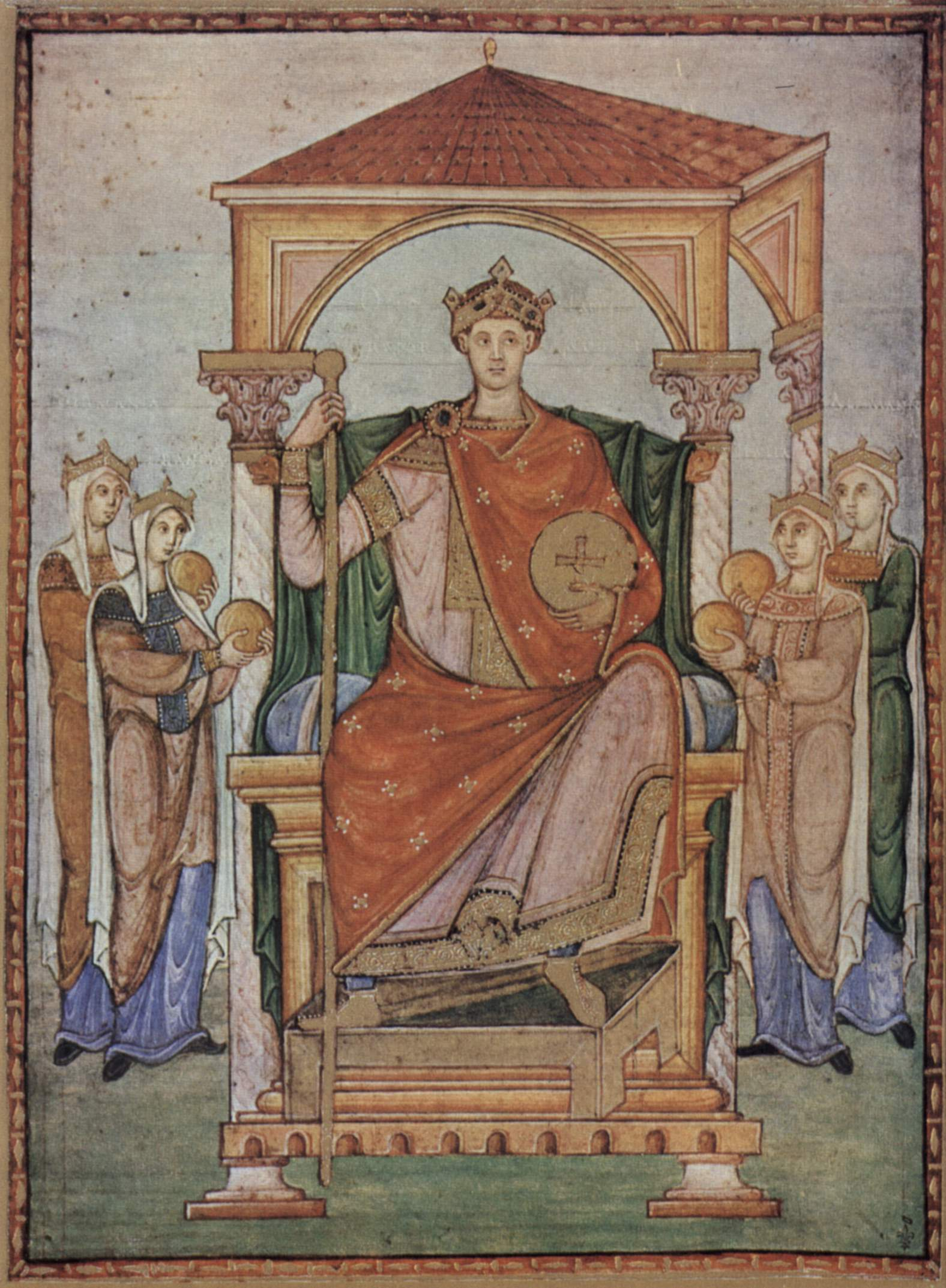
Otto II, Registrum Gregorii, Trier, c. 985, 27 × 20 centimetres (7.9 in), Chantilly, Musée Condé

The concept of a renaissance was first applied to the Ottonian period by the German historian Hans Naumann - more precisely, his work published in 1927 grouped the Carolingian and Ottonian periods together under the title Karolingische und ottonische Renaissance (The Carolingian and Ottonian Renaissance). This was only two years after Erna Patzelt's coining of the term 'Carolingian Renaissance' (Die Karolingische Renaissance: Beiträge zur Geschichte der Kultur des frühen Mittelalters, Vienna, 1924), and the same year as Charles H. Haskins published The Renaissance of the Twelfth Century.

One of three medieval renaissances, the Ottonian Renaissance began after King Otto's marriage to Adelaide of Italy (951) united the Italian and German kingdoms, and thus brought the West closer to Byzantium. He furthered the cause of Christian (political) unity with his Imperial coronation in 962 by the Pope at St. Peter's Basilica in Rome.

The "Ottonian Renaissance" is also referred to as the "Renaissance of the 10th century" to account for its manifestations outside Germany, or as the "renewal of the year 1000", as it extends into the 11th century. It is, in any case, more limited than the Carolingian Renaissance and largely a continuation of it. This has led, for example, Pierre Riché to prefer the term "Third Carolingian Renaissance" to cover the 10th century and parts of the 11th century, with the first two occurring during the reign of Charlemagne and his successors.

== Background ==
=== Carolingian legacy ===
==== Continuation of the Carolingian Renaissance ====
The 10th-century renewal cannot be considered independently of the Carolingian Renaissance. Thanks to Charlemagne and his successors, particularly Louis the Pious and Charles the Bald, Christian Western Europe experienced an exceptional period of cultural revival from the late 8th to the late 9th century. This revival was primarily evident in the world of schools, driven by ambitious educational legislation starting with the Admonitio generalis of 789 and a dense network of study centers. Another major manifestation of the Carolingian Renaissance was the vibrant court culture, particularly at Aachen, where some refer to a "Palatine Academy", as well as among various princes and bishops eager to attract skilled scholars.

There was no major break marking the end of the Carolingian Renaissance. The cultural development of Christian Western Europe was little affected by the Treaty of Verdun of 843 or the Viking invasions: the division of the Empire had minimal impact on scholarly and intellectual life. At most, one can note a slight slowdown in the development of schools. The Ottonian Renaissance is undoubtedly a continuation of the Carolingian cultural legacy.

==== The Kingdom of Germany, the Ottonians, and the renovatio imperii ====
When Otto I was crowned in Aachen in 936, he clearly positioned himself as the successor to Charlemagne. The return to Carolingian tradition was indeed Otto's primary goal, exemplified on February 2, 962, by his imperial coronation in Rome by Pope John XII. With no emperor since the death of Berengar I in 924, the imperial crown enhanced the prestige of Otto's conquests in eastern Germany and Italy. The dream of restoring the Empire (renovatio imperii) was revived by Otto, who took the title Imperator Augustus, and by his successors Otto II (who preferred Imperator Romanorum) and Otto III.

The imperial restoration was not only a political achievement but also a cultural and religious one. Scholars patronized by the Ottonians did not hesitate to glorify the renovatio imperii program. Otto I, crowned in Aachen and Rome, was entrusted with a religious mission: protecting the Roman Church, fostering harmony among Christians, combating barbarians, and expanding Christendom. This mission remained central to his successors, forming the foundation of what historiography calls the Holy Roman Empire.

=== Foundations of the renewal ===
==== Reorganization of libraries ====
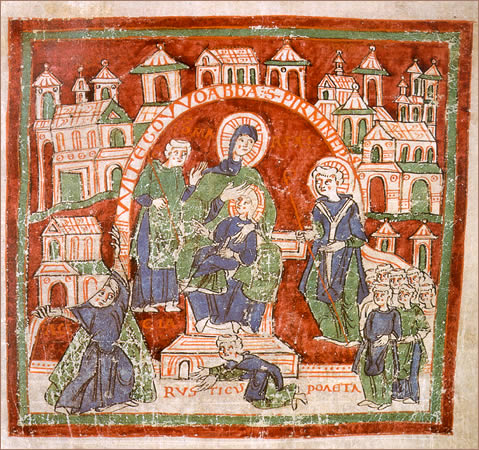
Abbot Witigowo of Reichenau (985–997), depicted here, restored the abbey's prominence in producing luxury manuscripts. Purchard, Life of Witigowo, Reichenau, folio 72r.

Libraries established and enriched during the Carolingian Renaissance through the intense activity of scriptoria saw further development in the 10th century, as evidenced by surviving catalogs. The catalog of Bobbio lists nearly 600 works, and that of Fleury nearly as many. Gerbert played a significant role in acquisitions and cataloging at Bobbio's library and amassed a respectable personal collection. Other scholars of the time also owned substantial libraries, such as Adso of Montier-en-Der, who listed his books before departing for the Holy Land, where he died in 992:

List of the books of Lord Abbot Adso, which we found in his chest after his departure for Jerusalem.
1. Isagoge by Porphyry, 2. Categories by Aristotle, 3. Categories by Saint Augustine, 4. A book of the ten Categories, without author, 5. The Rhetoric of Tullius [the De Inventione by Cicero], 6. Commentary of Servius on Virgil, 7. and 8. two books by Terence, 9. A Sedulius, 10. Book by Ambrose on the Sacraments, 11. Life of Saint John the Almsgiver, 12. Commentary of Moridach on Donatus, 13. A small book containing all the titles of Terence, 14. Exposition on the ten Eclogues of Virgil and the Georgics, 15. An Eutyches, 16. A small book called Martinellus, 17. An alphabetical glossary, 18. A glossary drawn from the Nuptials of Philology by Martianus, 19. The De Metrica ratione by Bede, 20. History by a certain Freculf of Lisieux, 21. Declensions, 22. Expositions by Haymo on the Epistle of Paul to the Romans, 23. Extracts from the books of Pompeius Festus.

==== Increased exchanges ====
Thanks to two centuries of relative political stability, communication was facilitated compared to previous centuries: travel became easier, and external influences on the West became more pronounced, including Greco-Byzantine influences, as evidenced by the marriage of Otto II to Theophanu in 972, and Arab influences, primarily through Muslim Spain. Contacts with the County of Barcelona were particularly significant: scholars flocked to the court of Borrell II (including the young Gerbert from 967 to 970), to Ripoll, or to Vic. Jewish influences were also present, with prominent figures like Rabbi Gershom, known as "Meor haGola" (Light of the Exile), teaching in Mainz and Metz, whose influence paved the way for figures like Rashi.

== Centers of learning in Western Europe ==
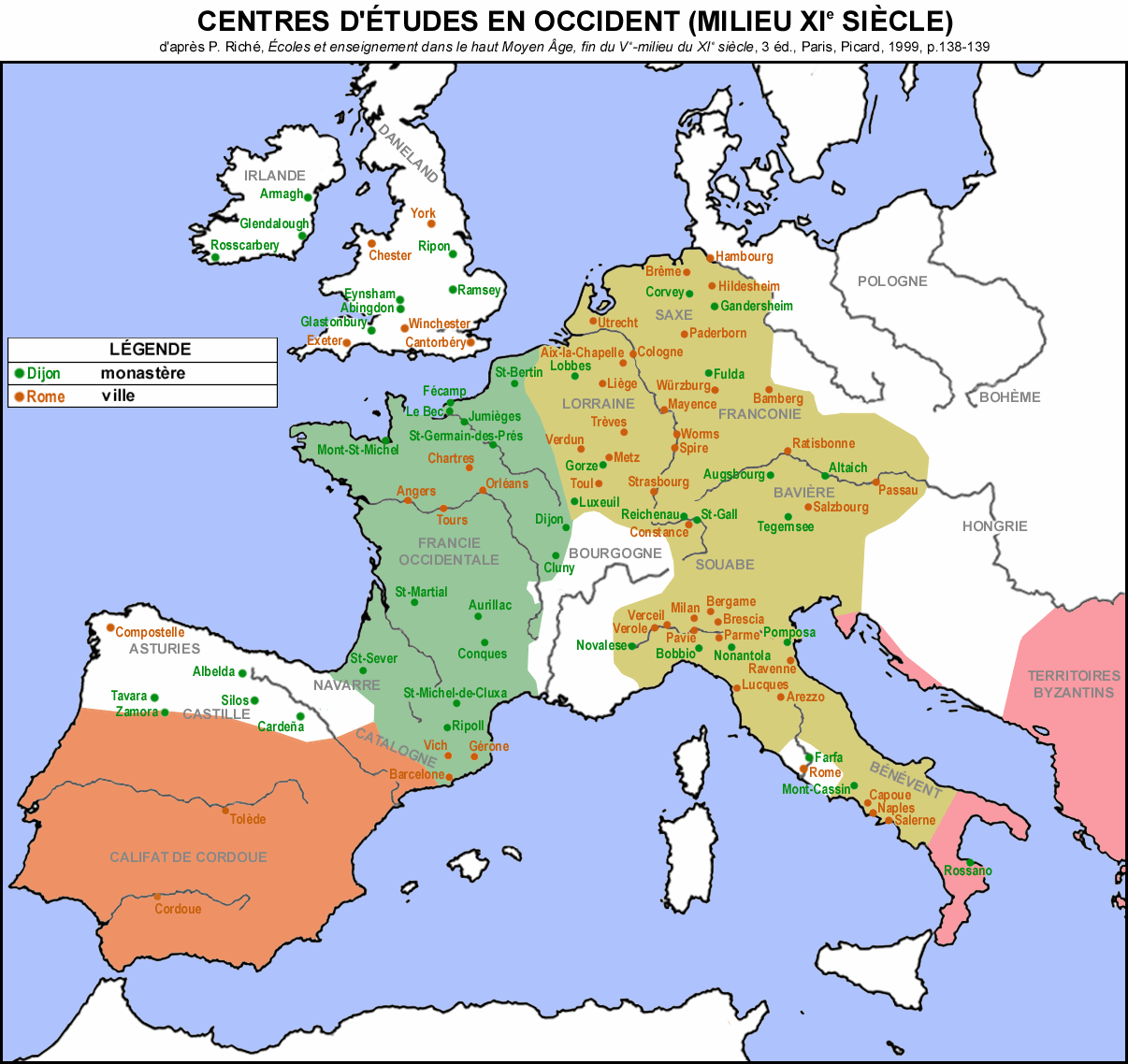
Centers of learning in Western Europe in the mid-11th century

The map of major monastic and episcopal scholarly centers in Western Europe changed little between the late 9th and early 11th centuries. The main centers remained consistent, though some new ones emerged, particularly in regions with growing cultural activity (Germany, Catalonia).

=== Germany ===
In southern Germany (which became the Holy Roman Empire from 962), the school at St. Gall remained a key center thanks to remarkable teachers: Notker the Stammerer, Ekkehard II, and his brilliant disciples, Burchard, abbot of St. Gall from 1003 to 1022, and Notker Labeo, primarily a translator of classics into German. Ekkehard IV succeeded him, with his main work, the Casus Sancti Galli, recounting the history of St. Gall's teachers since the late 9th century. The school declined in the mid-11th century due to abbey reforms. Reichenau experienced a more unstable trajectory, with a decline before Abbot Witigowo ("Abbas Aureus"), from 985 to 997, restored its reputation, particularly through the production of luxury manuscripts under Otto III and Henry II. Abbot Berno (1008–1048), a student of Abbo, counted among his disciples Hermannus Contractus, one of the era's most versatile scholars, known for treatises on the astrolabe, computation, and music. The abbey produced no further notable scholars after his death in 1054.

In Bavaria, Tegernsee, enriched by Abbot Gozpert's library, hosted the poet and translator Froumund of Tegernsee. Further north, Regensburg, under Abbot Ramwold (975–1001), had a school led by the monk Hartwich (trained at Chartres) focused on the liberal arts, with a scriptorium producing luxury manuscripts. In Saxony, Otric taught at the episcopal school in Magdeburg. The episcopal school in Hildesheim flourished under Bernward, known for his works and later tutor to Otto III. In the 11th century, Hildesheim remained active, while schools in Bamberg (a new bishopric established by Henry II with a rich library from the imperial collection) and Worms (rivaling Würzburg) developed further.

=== Lotharingia ===
Lotharingia remained rich in monastic and episcopal study centers. Echternach was known for its library. Cologne became a center of learning thanks to Bruno: its school trained bishops Theodoric of Metz, Wigfrid of Verdun, and Gerard of Toul. Liège (a bishopric under Cologne), already active under Stephen (901–920), Ratherius (953–955), and Eraclus (959–971), became the "Athens of the North" under Notker (972–1008). Notker also oversaw Lobbes Abbey, entrusting its direction to his friends Folcuin and Heriger, a poet, hagiographer, theologian, scientist, and friend of Gerbert. The scholaster Egbert, trained by Notker, wrote a manual titled Fecunda ratis (the "laden ship"), a collection of religious and moral poems. Students of Fulbert of Chartres settled in Liège in the early 11th century, including Adelman, who praised the city as a "nurse of the higher arts." Wazo served as scholaster before becoming bishop in 1042, followed by Adelman and Franco, author of a famous treatise on the quadrature of the circle.

=== France ===
In France, three schools stood out, each associated with a renowned master: Fleury, Reims, and Chartres.Saint-Benoît-sur-Loire (Fleury) gained prominence under Abbo, scholaster from 965 and abbot from 988 after a brief stay at Ramsey in England. He was succeeded by Abbot Gauzlin, whose life is known through a biography by his disciple Andrew of Fleury, who described Fleury as "nothing other than a torrent of the liberal arts and the gymnasium of the Lord's school."

Reims owed its reputation to Gerbert, who taught there from 972 and served as archbishop from 991 to 997. Chartres was recognized thanks to Fulbert, scholaster around 1004 and bishop from 1007, a respected advisor to Robert II. He left a rich collection of letters, sermons, and poems. His students included Berengar of Tours, Hartwic of St. Emmeram, and Adelman of Liège.

Other notable centers included Saint-Martial de Limoges, linked to Fleury, where Ademar of Chabannes excelled as a poet, sermon writer, historian, and illustrator; Mont Saint-Michel with its active scriptorium; Fécamp, where Abbot John composed influential meditative theological works; Saint-Riquier, where Abbot Angilram (†1045), a disciple of Fulbert, was skilled in grammar, music, and dialectic; and Saint-Bertin, which exchanged manuscripts and teachers with English schools.

=== England ===
In England, schools were reorganized by three bishops: Dunstan, Archbishop of Canterbury (959–988), Æthelwold, Bishop of Winchester (963–984), and Oswald, Bishop of Worcester and Archbishop of York (961–992). The most renowned teachers in the early 11th century were Ælfric and his disciple Ælfric Bata, authors of Latin conversation manuals in dialogue form, and Byrhtferth, a student of Abbo during his time at Ramsey, who wrote a manual in Latin and Old English.

=== Mediterranean regions ===
Scholarly activity was less intense around the Mediterranean. In Catalonia, stimulated by Arab influences, scholars like Gerbert were trained in Barcelona, Vic, and Ripoll. The latter was Spain's largest school, especially in the 11th century under Oliba, who was abbot before becoming bishop of Vic.

In Italy, schools were less active until the early 11th century. Gerbert's brief abbacy at Bobbio (983–984) was too troubled by administrative issues to foster significant teaching. Urban schools began to develop around the year 1000, notably in Parma, where Peter Damian and Anselm of Besate, author of a Rhetorimachia, were educated before the latter moved to Germany. Lanfranc was trained in his hometown and the kingdom's capital, Pavia, mastering the liberal arts and law before becoming a notable teacher in Normandy. Schools also existed in Novara, Verona, and Cremona.

Further south, schools revived in Arezzo under Bishop Theodald, who welcomed the famous musician Guido of Arezzo around 1030, known for his solmization and the invention of the Guidonian hand. Schools also flourished under the influence of the dukes of Naples, Capua, and Salerno, where Bishop Alfanus, a poet, imitator of classical authors, and scholar of music, astronomy, and medicine, shone. Alfanus was trained at Monte Cassino, which regained prestige under Abbot Theobald (†1035), with figures like Laurence, later bishop of Amalfi (from 1030), who compiled a florilegium of pagan and Christian poetic and scientific works, including texts by Boethius, for students.

Italy produced other notable figures: Yves the Rhetorician, the philosopher and dialectician Drogo, and the grammarian Papias, whose glossary quickly gained popularity in the West.

== Educational content ==
=== Teaching according to Abbo and Gerbert ===
According to Pierre Riché, "two names best symbolize this renaissance: Abbo, abbot of Saint-Benoît-sur-Loire, and Gerbert, scholaster of Reims, later pope of the year 1000." Near contemporaries, both born around 940 and dying in 1003 (Gerbert) and 1004 (Abbo), they were exceptional scholars who left significant works and trained numerous disciples.

==== Abbo of Fleury ====
Born in Orléans, Abbo was presented by his parents to Saint-Benoît-sur-Loire before 950. He studied in Paris and Reims to complete his education, returning to Fleury as scholaster around 965. He stayed at Ramsey in England from 985 to 987, but returned to become Fleury's abbot in 988. Engaged in defending his monastery's rights and combating abuses (simony, lay possession of ecclesiastical property), he advised Robert II and led two embassies to Rome in 995 and 997, securing privileges for his abbey. In 1004, while inspecting the Gascon dependency of La Réole, he was killed by rebellious monks. His life is known through a biography by his disciple Aimoin.

Abbo's teaching is known through his pedagogical works, particularly his Quaestiones grammaticales, a collection of answers to grammatical questions posed by his Ramsey students, and treatises on dialectic and sciences reflecting a novel interest in these disciplines. Aimoin describes Abbo's role as a teacher:

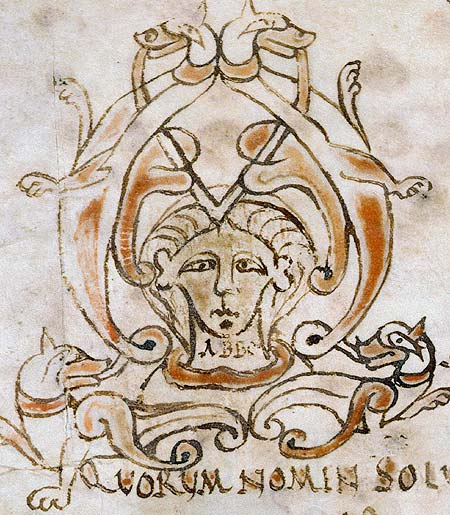
Stylized depiction of Abbo in a manuscript of Aristotle's Categories and Abbo's De syllogismis hypotheticis (Fleury, c. 962–986, folio 62)

As he reached the pinnacle of knowledge, he was asked to share it with others and took on the role of scholaster.
He taught students for several years with such care in reading and chant that he openly rejoiced that the funds entrusted to him increased his gains. Eager to explore further secrets of knowledge and visit various centers of wisdom, having mastered grammar, arithmetic, and dialectic, he sought to add knowledge of other arts. Thus, he went to the schools of Paris and Reims to hear the philosophers teaching there. He studied with them for a time but did not achieve as much as he hoped.
Returning to Orléans, he connected with a cleric who, secretly due to envious peers and for a large sum, initiated him into the sweetness of music. Thereafter, fully versed in five of the liberal arts, he surpassed all his contemporaries in knowledge. Rhetoric and geometry remained, which he did not master as fully as he wished but was not entirely unfamiliar with. He read Victorinus on the richness of rhetoric, whom Jerome, translator of divine law, boasted of having as a teacher. His knowledge of geometric calculations was far from mediocre, so that, with his keen intellect actively grasping all these things, their works were accessible to him.

==== Gerbert of Aurillac ====
From a modest background in Auvergne, Gerbert entered as an oblate at Saint-Géraud d'Aurillac before studying in Catalonia from 967 to 969. In 970, he visited Rome, meeting Otto I. He became scholaster of Reims in 972 under Archbishop Adalberon. His teaching soon made him one of the West's most renowned scholars.

From the 980s, Gerbert's career increasingly aligned with the Ottonians. Briefly abbot of Bobbio under Otto II in 983, he returned to Reims hoping to succeed Adalberon. Hugh Capet (whose election he supported) chose Arnoul (illegitimate son of King Lothair) instead, but Arnoul was deposed in 991, and Gerbert succeeded him amid controversy: the pope did not recognize his election, and Gerbert sought refuge with Otto III in 997. At age 14, Otto benefited from Gerbert's teaching. The emperor appointed Gerbert archbishop of Ravenna in 998 and pope in 999 as Sylvester II, symbolizing imperial control over the papacy. Gerbert died in 1003, a year after Otto III's death in 1002.

Gerbert's reputation as scholaster of Reims owed much to his most famous student, Richer, who devoted significant space to him in his four-book Histoire. Richer recalled Gerbert's foundational teaching, marked by a humanistic culture blending classical references and a fresh interest in dialectic:

How he prepared his students for the study of rhetoric.
He read and explained with profit four books on various types of reasoning, two on categorical syllogisms, three on hypothetical syllogisms, one on definitions, and one on divisions. Afterward, he wanted to advance his students to rhetoric; but he feared that without knowledge of poetic styles, they could not attain oratorical skill. Thus, he introduced poets he deemed suitable for their study, reading and commenting on Virgil, Statius, and Terence, the satirists Juvenal, Persius, and Horace, and the historiographer Lucan; once his students were familiar with these authors and their styles, he introduced them to rhetoric.
Why he provided them with a sophist.
After completing rhetoric, he entrusted them to a sophist to train them in debate, so they could handle reasoning with an art that seemed artless, which appears to be the orator's highest perfection.

=== Libraries ===
Libraries were created and enriched during the Ottonian Renaissance through the intense activity of the monastic scriptoria and were the subject of further developments in the 10th century, as evidenced by the catalogs that have survived. The catalog of Bobbio Abbey lists almost 600 works, that of Fleury Abbey nearly the same count. Gerbert (the future Pope Sylvester II) played an important role in the acquisition and inventory of the library of Bobbio, and spent his wealth to fund his collection. Adso of Montier-en-Der's book chest included a large number of books such as those of Porphyry, Aristotle, Terence, Cicero, and Virgil.

=== Innovations: dialectic and sciences ===
==== Dialectic ====
Until this period, the logica vetus (consisting of Boethius's translations of Aristotle and Porphyry and Cicero's Topics) formed the basis of dialectic teaching. The discipline was revitalized in the late 10th century by the rediscovery of Boethius's works through exchanges with the Byzantine Empire: the Categorical Syllogisms and Hypothetical Syllogisms, added to his Definitions and Divisions.

Gerbert was familiar with these texts and distinguished himself through his mastery of dialectic during the 980 Ravenna dispute with Otric and in his treatise De rationali et ratione uti (On the Rational and the Use of Reason), written in 997 and dedicated to Otto III. Abbo commented on these works of Boethius in two treatises, appreciated by his student Aimoin, who said of his master that he very clearly untangled certain knots of dialectical syllogisms (...).

Fulbert was familiar with Abbo's and especially Gerbert's works: manuscript 100 of the Chartres municipal library, a florilegium of dialectic works from Fulbert's time and likely from his collection, includes Porphyry's Introduction, Aristotle's Categories, Fulbert's own Distinction between Rhetoric and Dialectic, Cicero's Topics, Aristotle's Peri Hermeneia, three commentaries by Boethius, and Gerbert's De Ratione from 997. The Chartres master further developed dialectic teaching, increasingly mastered in the early 11th century, as did Abbot Majolus of Cluny.

==== Sciences ====
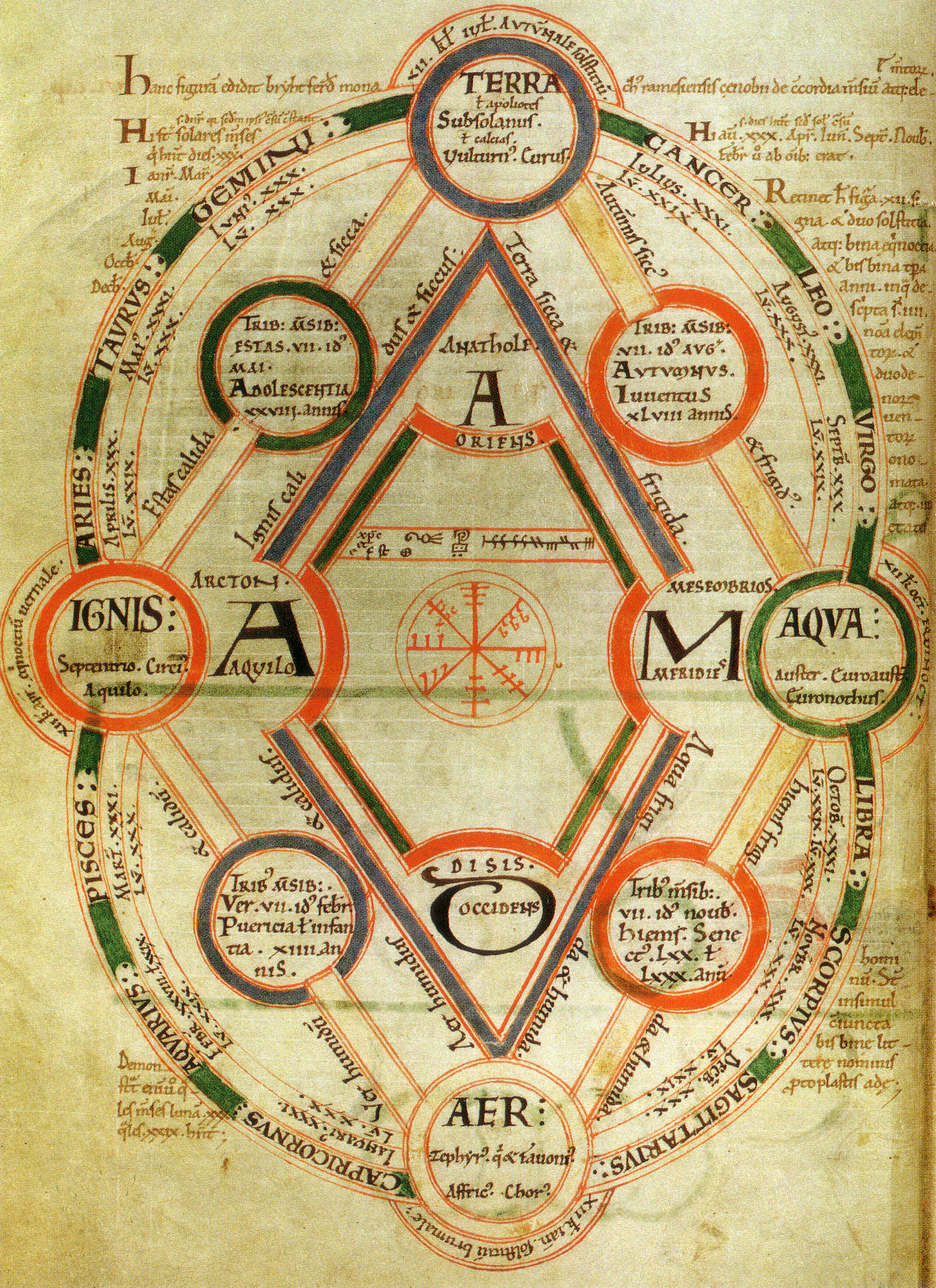
Ottonian era diagram, Diagram of Byrthferth: the mysteries of the universe

Growing interest in the quadrivium disciplines is evident in the teachings of the era's leading scholars.

Abbo's scientific teaching is noted by Aimoin in his Life of Abbo:

(...) He set out cycles in the form of tables, varied and pleasing computational calculations. He also recorded his discussions on the paths of the sun, moon, and planets for posterity.

Specifically, Abbo left several astronomy treatises, a star catalog, and a commentary on Victorinus of Aquitaine's Calculus, enabling him to establish a perpetual Julian calendar. However, he was unaware of Arab mathematical innovations.

Gerbert's teaching in the scientific disciplines of the quadrivium is better documented. Richer details Gerbert's methods in arithmetic, music, and especially astronomy:

He began by teaching arithmetic (...), then worked to spread knowledge of music (...) by arranging genres on the monochord, distinguishing consonances or symphonies in tones and semitones, ditones and dieses, and methodically distributing sounds in various modes.
(...) It is not out of place to describe the effort he put into explaining astronomy; by admiring the sagacity of such a great man, the reader can appreciate his genius. (...) He first represented the world with a solid wooden sphere, which, in its small proportions, accurately depicted ours. He positioned the polar axis obliquely to the horizon, depicting northern constellations near the upper pole and southern ones near the lower. He fixed this position using the circle, called horizon by the Greeks and limitans or determinans by the Latins, as it separates visible from invisible stars. With the sphere thus placed on the horizon to practically and convincingly demonstrate the rising and setting of stars, he introduced his students to the plan of the universe and taught them to recognize constellations. In clear nights, he studied the stars, noting their rising and setting as they moved across different parts of the earth.

Besides the monochord for music and the terrestrial sphere, Gerbert built other spheres for studying planets and constellations and an abacus, a calculating table, for teaching computation and geometry:

Gerbert devoted no less care to teaching geometry. To prepare for this science, he had an armorer construct an abacus, a tablet designed for calculation, divided into twenty-seven longitudinal columns, where he placed nine numerals to represent all numbers. He also had a thousand horn markers made, which, arranged in the abacus's twenty-seven compartments, facilitated multiplication and division of all kinds of numbers with such speed that, given their vast range, it was easier to conceptualize than express them. Those wishing to fully understand this system should read Gerbert's work addressed to the grammarian Constantine, where it is amply and appropriately treated.

His exchanges with his disciple Constantine, a monk at Saint-Benoît-sur-Loire, form the core of Gerbert's scientific legacy, focusing on arithmetic and the use of the abacus. A letter on constructing spheres for astronomical study and a treatise on geometry further attest to his contributions. Gerbert's extensive scientific knowledge led to claims that he introduced Arabic numerals (without the zero) to Gaul, though this remains debated.

Fulbert adopted Gerbert's abacus and taught geometry to his students. In his poems on the zodiac, he referenced the astrolabe and used Arabic numerals. However, Gerbert and Fulbert's advancements were relatively isolated: the spread of the decimal system in positional notation in the West awaited Fibonacci's Liber abaci (1202, revised 1228) and translations of Al-Khwārizmī by Gerard of Cremona in the 12th century.

== Arts ==
The Ottonian Renaissance is recognized especially in the arts and architecture, invigorated by renewed contact with Constantinople, in some revived cathedral schools, such as that of Archbishop Bruno of Cologne, in the production of illuminated manuscripts from a handful of elite scriptoria, such as Quedlinburg Abbey, founded by Otto in 936, and in political ideology. The Imperial court became the center of religious and spiritual life, led by the example of women of the royal family: Matilda the literate mother of Otto I, his sister Gerberga of Saxony, or his consort Adelaide. The Byzantine influence further increased with the marriage of Otto II with Princess Theophanu, who upon her husband's death in 983 ruled as Empress dowager for her minor son Otto III until 991.

After Otto I's Imperial coronation, there emerged a renewed faith in the idea of Empire in Otto's immediate circle and a reformed church, creating a period of heightened cultural and artistic fervor. Ottonian art was a court art, created to confirm a direct Holy and Imperial lineage as a source of legitimized power linked from Constantine and Justinian. In this atmosphere the masterpieces that were created fused the traditions which the new art was based on: paintings from Late Antiquity, the Carolingian period, and Byzantium. In this way, the term is used as an analogue to the Carolingian Renaissance which accompanied Charlemagne's coronation in 800.

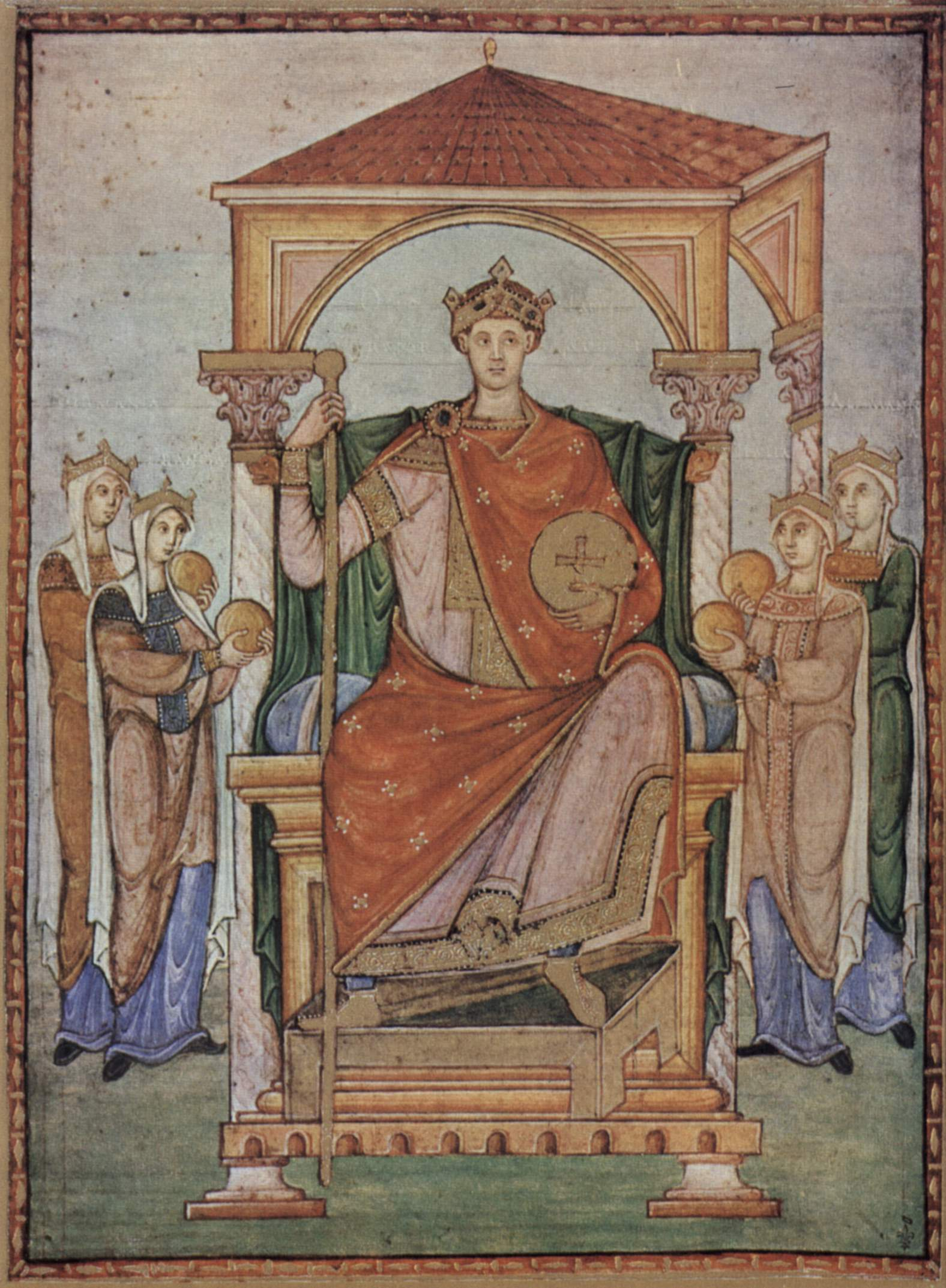
Emperor Otto II, Registrum Gregorii, Trier, c. 985, 27 × 20 cm, Musée Condé, Chantilly

A small group of Ottonian monasteries received direct sponsorship from the Emperor and bishops and produced some magnificent medieval illuminated manuscripts, the premier art form of the time. Corvey produced some of the first manuscripts, followed by the scriptorium at Hildesheim after 1000. The most famous Ottonian scriptorium was at the island monastery of Reichenau on Lake Constance: hardly any other works have formed the image of Ottonian art as much as the miniatures which originated there. One of the greatest Reichenau works was the Codex Egberti, containing narrative miniatures of the life of Christ in a fusion of styles including Carolingian traditions as well as traces of insular and Byzantine influences. Other well known manuscripts included the Reichenau Evangeliary, the Liuther Codex, the Pericopes of Henry II, the Bamberg Apocalypse and the Hitda Codex.

Hroswitha of Gandersheim characterises the changes which took place during the time. She was a nun who composed verse and drama, based on the classical works of Terence. The architecture of the period was also innovative and represents a predecessor to the later Romanesque.

Politically, theories of Christian unity and empire thrived, as well as revived classical notions of Imperial grandeur in the West. By Otto II's Greek wife Theophanu, Byzantine iconography entered the West. The globus cruciger became a symbol of kingly power and the Holy Roman Emperors were represented as crowned by Christ in the Byzantine fashion. It was in trying to revive the "glory that was Rome" that Otto III made the Eternal City his capital and increased in Greco-Roman fashion the ceremony of the court. Schools also revived under the influence of the Dukes of Naples and Capua where the illustrious Bishop St Alfanus I, an imitator of ancient writers, was closely involved in music, astronomy and medicine.

== Evolution of the Church ==
=== Cluniac growth ===
The 10th century saw the rise in France of a monastery in the Mâconnais, founded in 909 or 910, which became the center of an expanding ecclesiastical network: the "Church of Cluny" (Ecclesia cluniacensis), overseeing a growing number of abbeys and priories.

Cluny's founder was William the Pious, son of the powerful Count of Auvergne Bernard Plantapilosa and grandson of Dhuoda. William entrusted the abbey to Berno (†926), who initiated a reform to adhere strictly to the Rule of Saint Benedict. This work was continued by Abbot Odo (927–942), and the abbey flourished under Abbots Aymard (942–954), Majolus, and especially Odilo, who secured an exemption privilege from Pope Gregory V in 998, extended by Pope John XIX to all Cluniac dependencies in 1024. By the 11th century, the number of dependent abbeys grew from thirty-seven to sixty-five, including Vézelay and Saint-Pierre de Moissac.

Cluniacs played a pivotal role in Benedictine monasticism until the end of the 12th-century Renaissance and beyond. Cluniac spirituality sought to restore the Rule of Saint Benedict, emphasizing choral celebration of the office, prioritizing this over traditional monastic retreat or cell isolation. This made Cluny the most cenobitic form of the Benedictine tradition, influencing all aspects of Cluniac life, including improved diet for choral performance and reduced manual labor, including in scriptoria: Cluny's library from the 10th to 13th centuries was the richest in the West after Monte Cassino, but its monastic school remained of limited activity.

=== Urgency of reform in the late 10th century ===
Cluny's role was crucial in the Gregorian Reform, but other centers acted spontaneously in the same direction: Brogne, founded in 919 under the Benedictine rule, led reforms in Belgium and Flanders; Gorze, reformed around 933, influenced Lorraine and German monasticism; Saint-Victor de Marseille, reformed by Honoratus in 977, adopted the Benedictine rule.

These reform centers responded to an increasingly urgent need. The 10th century saw a decline in public order, leading to what Jean Chélini calls a moral and institutional decadence in the West. Pagan practices (spirit worship, witchcraft), moral and marital decline (repudiation, multiple marriages), and barbaric ordeals in justice resurged. Within the Church, simony became widespread, the Capetians (Hugh Capet, Robert the Pious) engaged in lucrative trafficking of episcopal offices, and ecclesiastical roles were overly politicized from the reign of Otto I.

The Church also faced challenges in newly Christianized regions like Scandinavia, where resistance and pagan customs posed difficulties (see Spread of Christianity in the 5th to 15th centuries). Christianization was relatively straightforward in Denmark, with the conversion of King Harald and his son Sweyn around 960, but more gradual in Norway, through the efforts of early Christian kings Haakon (938–961), Olaf Tryggvason (995–1000), and Saint Olaf Haraldsson (1014–1030), who relied on foreign missionaries. In Sweden, Christianity spread more slowly, starting with the Birka community (founded in 865, revived by Unni of Hamburg's visit, who died there in 936) and Sigtuna, leading to the probable conversion of King Olof Skötkonung around 1008. Bohemia was Christianized with the establishment of the Diocese of Prague in 973 and the mission of the hermit Gunther (†1045), as were Poland (conversion of Mieszko in 966) and Hungary (baptism of Géza and his son Stephen I in 985), all facing pagan resistance.

== Limitations ==
=== A limited renewal ===
Whether considered primarily Ottonian, of the 10th century, around the year 1000, or as a continuation of the Carolingian Renaissance, the "renaissance" had clear limits.

Geographical limitations were evident first. Cultural vitality varied sharply between Germany and the rest of the West, or between northern and southern Europe, and the scholarly network was unevenly dense. Human limitations also existed: beyond the two main figures, Abbo and Gerbert, the period's notable scholars were fewer and less productive than the exceptional generations of Carolingian scholars from Peter of Pisa to John Scotus Eriugena. The quantitative output of the 10th and 11th centuries was not comparable to the Carolingian period, and education remained primarily based on the liberal arts and texts written or rediscovered under Charlemagne and his successors.

The disengagement of kings and princes from education and culture further distinguished the Ottonian period from the preceding two centuries. While this is less true for Germany, it exacerbated geographical disparities and reduced the renewal's scope, which was almost solely driven by ecclesiastical circles:

The alliance between power and the scholarly clerical world seems broken. The Church falls into lay hands, and the greatest intellectual of the time, Gerbert, shows no interest in the small Frankish kingdom where he was born. As for the monks, they scatter like flocks of sparrows, hastily carrying relics and manuscripts under the blows of Danes, Saracens, or Hungarians. […] From 911, Normandy, and since 878, Brittany, lose all trace of culture.

Thus, the renewal from around 900 to 1030 should be seen primarily as a period of resistance for Carolingian cultural activity (aptly termed the "Third Carolingian Renaissance" by Pierre Riché), in a more unstable context, marked by limited periods of growth in time and space. It concluded a long era of Western cultural unification and the gradual development of medieval education:

The foundations laid by the pioneers of the 6th and 7th centuries prepared the Carolingian edifice, completed by the monks and clerics of the 10th century. Educational institutions no longer needed political impetus to progress and establish themselves. […] What a distance between Alcuin's religiously and liturgically dominated culture and that of Fulbert and his students! […] In an intellectually unified world, beyond kingdom borders, a clerical intelligentsia, moving freely between schools and communicating easily through the universal language of ecclesiastical Latin, could rapidly advance and spread scientific and pedagogical innovations. Now that the ancient curriculum was fully applied (unlike under the Roman Empire), the fruits of this education could emerge.

=== Challenging aftermath ===
The final limitation of the Ottonian Renaissance concerns the sustainability of the renewal. The remarkable cultural flourishing of the 12th century did not immediately follow the 10th-century renewal, even considering its extension beyond the year 1000. The 11th century, marked by political, social, and economic transformations, was a crisis period for schools and the intellectual world. The humanistic culture of the Carolingian era, rich in classical references, gave way to less rigorous, often heretical, doctrines, with Berengar of Tours as a prominent example.

== See also ==
- Ottonian art (Pre-Romanesque art)
- Ottonian architecture
- Carolingian Renaissance
- Renaissance of the year 1000
- Renaissance of the 12th century
- Northumbria's Golden Age
- Golden Age of medieval Bulgarian culture
- Macedonian Renaissance
- Palaeologan Renaissance

== Notes ==
=== Bibliography ===
- Bossuat, Robert; Pichard, Louis; Raynaud de Lage, Guy; Hasenohr, Geneviève; Zink, Michel (1964). Dictionnaire des lettres françaises, Le Moyen Âge [Dictionary of French Letters: The Middle Ages]. Fayard.
- Gauvard, Claude; Libera, Alain; Zink, Michel (2002). Dictionnaire du Moyen Âge [Dictionary of the Middle Ages]. Paris: PUF.
- Iogna-Prat, Dominique; Picard, Jean-Charles (1990). Religion et culture autour de l'an mil [Religion and culture around the year 1000] (in French). Picard.
- Guyotjeannin, Olivier; Poulle, Emmanuel (1996). Autour de Gerbert d'Aurillac, le pape de l'an mil [Around Gerbert of Aurillac, the pope of the year 1000] (in French). École des chartes.
- Chélini, Jean (1968). Histoire religieuse de l'Occident médiéval [Religious History of the Medieval West] (in French). Nouvelle bibliographie.
- Le Goff, Jacques (1977). La civilisation de l'Occident médiéval [Medieval Western civilization] (in French). Arthaud.
- Le Goff, Jacques (1957). Les intellectuels au Moyen Âge [Intellectuals in the Middle Ages] (in French). Le Seuil.
- Riché, Pierre; Verger, Jacques (2006). Des nains sur des épaules de géants. Maîtres et élèves au Moyen Âge [Dwarfs on the shoulders of giants. Teachers and students in the Middle Ages] (in French). Tallandier.
- Riché, Pierre (1983). Les Carolingiens. Une famille qui fit l'Europe [The Carolingians: A Family That Shaped Europe] (in French). Hachette.
- Riché, Pierre (1973). L'Empire carolingien [The Carolingian Empire] (in French). Hachette.
- Riché, Pierre (1989). Gerbet d'Aurillac, pape de l'an mil [Gerbert of Aurillac, pope of the year 1000] (in French). Fayard.
- Riché, Pierre (1999). Écoles et enseignement dans le Haut Moyen Âge (fin du Ve siècle : milieu du XIe siècle [Schools and education in the Early Middle Ages (late 5th century: mid-11th century)] (in French). Picard.
- Parias, Michel (1981). Histoire générale de l'enseignement et de l'éducation en France, vol. I : Des origines à la Renaissance [General History of Teaching and Education in France, Vol. I: From the Origins to the Renaissance] (in French). Nouvelle Librairie de France.
- Sot, Michel; Boudet, Jean-Patrice; Guerreau-Jalabert, Anita; Rioux, Jean-Pierre; Sirinelli, Jean-François (1997). Histoire culturelle de la France [Cultural history of France] (in French). Le Seuil.
- Sot, Michel; Boudet, Jean-Patrice; Guerreau-Jalabert, Anita; Rioux, Jean-Pierre; Sirinelli, Jean-François (1997). Histoire culturelle de la France [Cultural history of France] (in French). Le Seuil.
