= Alexis Debat =

French terrorism and national security issues commentator

Alexis Debat (born 1977), currently using the name Yves Bergquist, is a French former commentator on terrorism and national security issues, formerly based in Washington D.C. He worked as a reporter, consultant, and source for ABC News for six years, as a senior fellow at the Nixon Center, and was a contributing editor to The National Interest. According to Mother Jones, he was the Director of the Terrorism and National Security Program at the Nixon Center. He was also part of the Consulting Committee of the French magazine Politique Internationale, headed by Patrick Wajsman, and worked until September 2007 for the National Security Institute at George Washington University on Islamist radicalization in Afghanistan since 2005. Since 2003, he has been called an "expert" by Time, U.S. News & World Report, National Journal, the Boston Herald, the Los Angeles Times, Associated Press, PBS, etc. He also wrote op-eds in the Financial Times and the International Herald Tribune.

However, he resigned from ABC News in June 2007, after some ABC officials raised questions about his credentials. He is currently the director of artificial intelligence and neuroscience in media at the Entertainment Technology Center.

== Background ==
An in-depth inquiry into his work as a consultant cleared his reporting, according to ABC News President David Westin. That investigation found no instances of false reporting, ABC said, but did uncover four details about operations and meetings in Pakistan that could not be confirmed. "None of these discrepancies would rise to the level of a formal, on-air retraction because none of them was material to the substance of our report," Mr. Westin wrote in an internal memo ABC has however deleted articles by Alexis Debat, replaced by the notice "This story has been removed from our Web site because of questions raised about the credibility of one of its authors, Alexis Debat."

Kerry Smith, ABC's senior vice president for editorial quality, who headed up the inquiry, described the process as "particularly sensitive" because it involved re-reporting on confidential sources, belonging not just to Mr. Debat but to other, current ABC reporters—reflecting the collective nature of investigative work. At one point, Ms. Smith sent a three-person team, which included an Urdu speaker and producer Rhonda Schwartz, to Pakistan to determine whether Mr. Debat went to the hotels he said he did, and to confirm that he met with the people he said he met with.

In an interview with The New York Observer in 2007, Debat said he felt cautiously pleased for himself and for his former colleagues by the results of the inquiry. "I'm very happy that their collective reputation is salvaged," said Mr. Debat.

In September 2007, the French news media Rue 89 alleged that two interviews, one of Barack Obama and the other of former US Federal Reserve Chairman Alan Greenspan, both published in the French magazine Politique Internationale, had been fabricated. These allegations in turn led to Debat's voluntary resignation, allegedly for "personal reasons", from The National Interest and the Nixon Center. Many other personalities also since stated that Politique Internationale published bogus interviews of them. The list included former US President Bill Clinton, US Speaker of the House Nancy Pelosi, former US Secretary of State Colin Powell, New York Mayor Michael Bloomberg, Microsoft founder Bill Gates, and former U.N. Secretary-General Kofi Annan.

Alexis Debat has denied Rue 89's allegations, and claimed that he was taking steps to charge Rue 89 and Pascal Riché, author of the story, for "slander. The trial is pending." He admitted however having made "a mistake" for Obama's interview. On the other hand, Debat also admitted he did not interview Bill Clinton, Pelosi, Bloomberg, Gates, Greenspan or Annan, but that these "interviews" were piece together from speeches, with the consent of Patrick Wasjman, the director of Politique Internationale. He has also claimed that "a technicality" had prevented the Sorbonne University from issuing his PhD, which he had not been made aware of.

Alexis Debat moved to California and currently uses the name Yves Bergquist.

== Controversy over "expert" status ==
Debat was a respected expert on terrorism issues, writing for example on the Jundallah Balochi and Sunni organisation, on the Tabligh organisation, on Iran and many other subjects. Two days before Rue 89 's revelations, Alexis Debat was the source of a Sunday Times article claiming that The Pentagon had a "‘three-day blitz’ plan for Iran". In an article published by National Journal, Laura Rozen has questioned Debat's account of alleged US support to the Jundallah in purported covert operations against Iran. This ABC report by Debat had itself been angrily denied by Pakistan official sources, ABC later reported. ABC precised that "ABC News stands by its reporting on this story." Laura Rozen then explained that according to the Center for Strategic and Budgetary Assessments, partially funded by the US government, Debat had been a paid employee of them, until the controversy lifted by Rue 89. Andrew Krepinevich, head of the conservative think-tank, put the blame on the competitive aspect of medias, recalling : "We had a contract with the Pentagon to do some work ... We hired Alexis to support us in that work. His sole arrangement with us was as a consultant.

Debat was paid as a "consultant" by ABC News, although he also wrote for ABC's The Blotter.

Debat presented himself as "former advisor to the French minister of Defense on Transatlantic Affairs," "visiting lecturer at Middlebury College" and claimed that he was at work on a manuscript on the history of the Central Intelligence Agency.

In an interview on PBS in Autumn 2005, during the riots in the French suburbs, he was introduced as a former social worker, claiming he had worked in Martine Aubry's foundation, Fondation Agir Contre l'Exclusion (FACE). On PBS, he claimed that "what started as isolated clashes quickly became a political opportunity for these people to put their situation at the forefront of the political debate to make headlines with their own situations," although he also underlined "a pervasive, very dark racism in French society that associates the second generation Muslims, these second generation immigrants with trouble."

According to his (now deleted) online biography at George Washington University's Homeland Security Policy Institute (a US governmental think tank), Debat is additionally claimed to have worked as an analyst for the French government on the Counter-Terrorism Coordinating Committee, as an expert on Islamic finance and Islamic law for clients such as Deutsche Bank and the Japan External Trade Organization, as a contractor for the RAND think tank, as advisor for the Business for Diplomatic Action consortium, and once again for the French government as "a desk officer for the Ministry of Defense."

According to Jeffrey Schneider from ABC, suspicions were aroused when the French government, in May 2007, told them that they were skeptical concerning Debat's scholarship credentials. Thereafter, ABC launched an investigation which in June 2007 led to his resignation, before inspecting all of his preceding work for ABC. Rue 89, however, pointed out that according to the French government, ABC was the first to contact the French embassy, and not otherwise. The latter answered them that it was not their job to verify credentials. Thereafter, ABC requested to the French embassy the contacts of the French Minister of Defence in order to verify this point in Debat's Curriculum Vitae. This point was later confirmed by ABC itself, who declared that they had made a mistake. Rue 89 later announced that a whistleblower inside ABC News had launched an unofficial investigation on Debat in May 2007.

Furthermore, two journalists at ABC have claimed that Debat's sensational articles were in fact supported by Brian Ross, ABC chief investigative correspondent. AP news agency has stated that ABC was now sending long time Ross producer Rhonda Schwartz to Pakistan to counter-check Debat's articles. Rue 89, however, questions ABC News' decision to let the control of the investigation to Brian Ross, who was Alexis Debat's direct superior. This inquiry into Debat's work as a consultant cleared his reporting, according to ABC News President David Westin (see above).

== Early warnings ==
Alexis Debat's credentials had been called into question once.

A spokesperson for the French defense Department asked Libération in September 2002 to run a correction after the French newspaper quoted Debat, presented as an "official at the French Defense Ministry", on the role Zacarias Moussaoui played in the September 11 attacks. The defense correspondent in Libération, Jean Dominique Merchet, then published the correction, stating that Debat was not currently a defense official, but had been in the past. The AFP news agency also contradicted ABC News on September 6, 2002 by reporting that Debat (who was then interviewed in the case concerning Zacarias Moussaoui) had never been an "official" but a "desk officer" at the French Defence Ministry. After allegedly looking into the matter, ABC News continued to present him as "former official in the French Minister of Defense" — according to Rue 89, he did make a brief passage at the Délégation aux Affaires stratégiques (Delegation of Strategic Affairs).

Stéphane Dujarric, chief spokesman for the UN secretary-general Kofi Annan, said he had denounced to Patrick Wajsman, head of Politique Internationale, the bogus interview in June 2005. Despite this warning, Debat continued to be cited by Politique Internationale as the author of interviews of international level personalities. When asked why he continued to work with Debat, Patrick Wajsman declared that "Everybody can be trusted once. He seemed to be well-connected in Washington, working for ABC and the Nixon center." Debat disputes this, and claims to have evidence that Wasjman asked him to piece together this interview from Annan's speeches.

== Debat's work ==
=== Debat as a news source ===
Debat was cited as primary source for many US news reports on a range of topics since 2001:

- "U.S. Strike Killed Al Qaeda Bomb Maker", ABC News (January 18, 2006)
- "The Secret War Against Iran", ABC News (April 3, 2007)
- "Suicide Bomb Teams Sent to U.S., Europe", ABC News (June 18, 2007). ABC has acknowledged him as a consultant on this story.
- "Pentagon three-day blitz plan for Iran", The Sunday Times (September 2, 2007)

=== Debat as a news reporter ===
Replaced by ABC by "This Story Has Been Removed From the Site" or "This story has been removed from our Web site because of questions raised about the credibility of one of its authors, Alexis Debat."

- "Why Al Qaeda Is At Home In Pakistan", ABC News (March 3, 2006)
- "Captured Zarqawi Aide Spilled the Beans", ABC News (June 9, 2006)
- "The Man Who Is Planning the Next Attack on America", ABC News (August 9, 2006)
- "Zawahiri Was Target in U.S. Attack on Religious School in Pakistan", ABC News (October 3, 2006)
- "American Passports Found on Bodies of Al Qaeda Fighters in Somalia", ABC News (June 5, 2007)

=== Essays and articles listed at the Nixon Center ===
Retrieved from Google Search.

- "In Praise of Warlords" (PDF), The National Interest (Summer 2006)
- "America the Vulnerable" (PDF), The National Interest (September/October 2006)
- "Terror and the Fifth Republic" (PDF), The National Interest (Winter 2005/2006)
- "Channel the violence", International Herald Tribune (November 21, 2006)
- "Hezbollah blinks; Britain leaves Iraq; NATO expansion and Russia", International Herald Tribune (February 25, 2007)
- "Vivisecting the Jihad: Part Two", The National Interest (online, October 14, 2004)
- "9/11: Not A Failure. A Choice.", The National Interest (online July 2003)

=== Debat in Politique Internationale ===
Patrick Wajsman, director of Politique Internationale, has now taken out all interviews of the website. Google cache still works for some alleged interviews. There are some discrepancies in date and issues; these come from the website itself. On its website, Politique Internationale presents itself as "the most influential Francophone journal dedicated to international questions."

- "Riyad-Washington: une alliance troublée", (Alleged) Interview of Donald de Marino. Issue n°94. Winter 2001–02.
- "Voyage au-coeur du renseignement américain", article by Alexis Debat. Issue n°95.
- "Vol au-dessus d'un nid de faucons", article by Alexis Debat. Issue n°99.
- "Europe/Etats-Unis: le grand écart", (Alleged) Interview of Charles Kupchan. Issue n°99.
- "George Bush et l'Irak: une première étape?", (Alleged) Interview of Bill Kristol. Issue n°101.
- "CIA, FBI: Un monde presque parfait...", (Alleged) Interview of John MacGaffin. Issue n°102.
- "La Planète renseignement", article by Alexis Debat. Issue n°102.
- "Terrorisme : les années noires de la maison blanche", (Alleged) Interview of Richard Clarke. Issue n°104.
- "Un Rêve américain", (Alleged) Interview of Arnold Schwarzenegger (co-authored by Damjan de Krnjevic-Miskovic, managing editor of The National Interest, and Alexis Debat). Issue n°105, Autumn 2004.
- "Rendez-Vous en 2008", (Alleged) Interview of Hillary Clinton. Issue n°106, Winter 2005.
- "Rebâtir l'Irak", (Alleged) Interview of Iyad Allaoui. Issue n°106, Winter 2005.
- "La Maison Blanche face au défi iranien." Article by Alexis Debat. Issue n°107,
- "L'homme qui faisait trembler Saddam Hussein...", (Alleged) Interview of Paul Wolfowitz. Issue n°107.
- "Pour une amérique sans entraves", (Alleged) Interview of John Bolton. Issue n°109, Autumn 2005.
- "Le Pakistan à la table des grands", (Alleged) Interview of Pervez Musharraf. Issue n°109, Autumn 2005.
- "New York! New York!", (Alleged) Interview of Michael Bloomberg. Issue n°110, Winter 2005. Refuted by Bloomberg.
- "Y a-t-il une vie après la Maison-Blanche?", (Alleged) Interview of Bill Clinton. Issue n°110, Winter 2005. Admitted as bogus by Debat.
- "La Croisade de l'homme le plus riche du monde", (Alleged) Interview of Bill Clinton. Issue n°111, Spring 2006. Admitted as bogus by Debat.
- "Mon Année à Bagdad", (Alleged) Interview of Paul Bremer. Issue n°111, Spring 2006.
- "La Planète Renseignement", (Alleged) Interview of John MacGaffin. Issue n°112, Summer 2006.
- "Le Magicien tire sa révérence", (Alleged) Interview of Alan Greenspan. Issue n°112, Summer 2006. Refuted by Greenspan.
- "Egypte: Le Prochain Rais", (Alleged) Interview of Gamal Moubarak. Issue n°114, Winter 2007.
- "La Femme la plus puissante du monde", (Alleged) Interview of Nancy Pelosi. Issue n° 114, Winter 2007. Refuted by Pelosi.
- "Abkhazie: le fantasme de l'indépendance", (Alleged) Interview of Serguei Bagapch (president of self-proclaimed Abkhazia), co-signed by Alexis Debat and Nathalie Ouvaroff. Issue n°114, Winter 2007.
- "De New York à Washington", (Alleged) Interview of Rudolph Giuliani. Issue n°115, Spring 2007.
- "Objectif Maison-Blanche", (Alleged) Interview of Barack Obama, co-signed by Alexis Debat and Thérèse Delpech. Issue n°115, Spring 2007. Refuted by Obama.

=== Debat in Libération ===
- "A Langley, pas plus de deux experts parlent pashtoun" (in Langley, "No More Than Two Experts Speak Pachtoun"), Libération, September 20, 2001 (mirrored here)
- "Moussaoui impliqué dans un autre attentat ?", September 7, 2002
- "Espionnage: puissant mais pas devin", February 6, 2003
- "Le nucléaire français surveillé de près", March 23, 2003
- "La France à la recherche du fantôme de l'aéroport", August 1, 2004
- "La colère des espions", July 6, 2003

== See also ==
- Journalism ethics and standards
