= Criticism of ABC =

Over the years, ABC, a division of The Walt Disney Company since 1996, including ABC Daytime and ABC News, has faced criticism and controversy on a range of issues, including depicting a school shooting rampage, Ted Koppel reading names of the members of the United States Armed Forces who were killed in Iraq, a contract dispute, false credentials, the purchase of Freeform, suspension of Jimmy Kimmel, and guests hosted on The View. Company officials and employees such as Alexis Debat and Michael Eisner have been criticized, while ABC series Ellen and Nothing Sacred have been criticized by Christian religious organizations.

== Company officials and employees ==
=== Alexis Debat ===
Alexis Debat, a consultant for ABC for years and also a writer for The National Interest, resigned from ABC in June 2007 after the broadcasting company discovered that he did not have a Ph.D. from the Sorbonne as he claimed. In September 2007, the French news media Rue 89 revealed that he had made at least two bogus interviews, one of Barack Obama and another of Alan Greenspan, both published in the French magazine Politique internationale. This led to his resignation from The National Interest. Debat had specialized in reports on terrorism and national security for the past six years (writing, for example, on the Jundallah Balochi and Sunni organization).

=== Michael Eisner ===
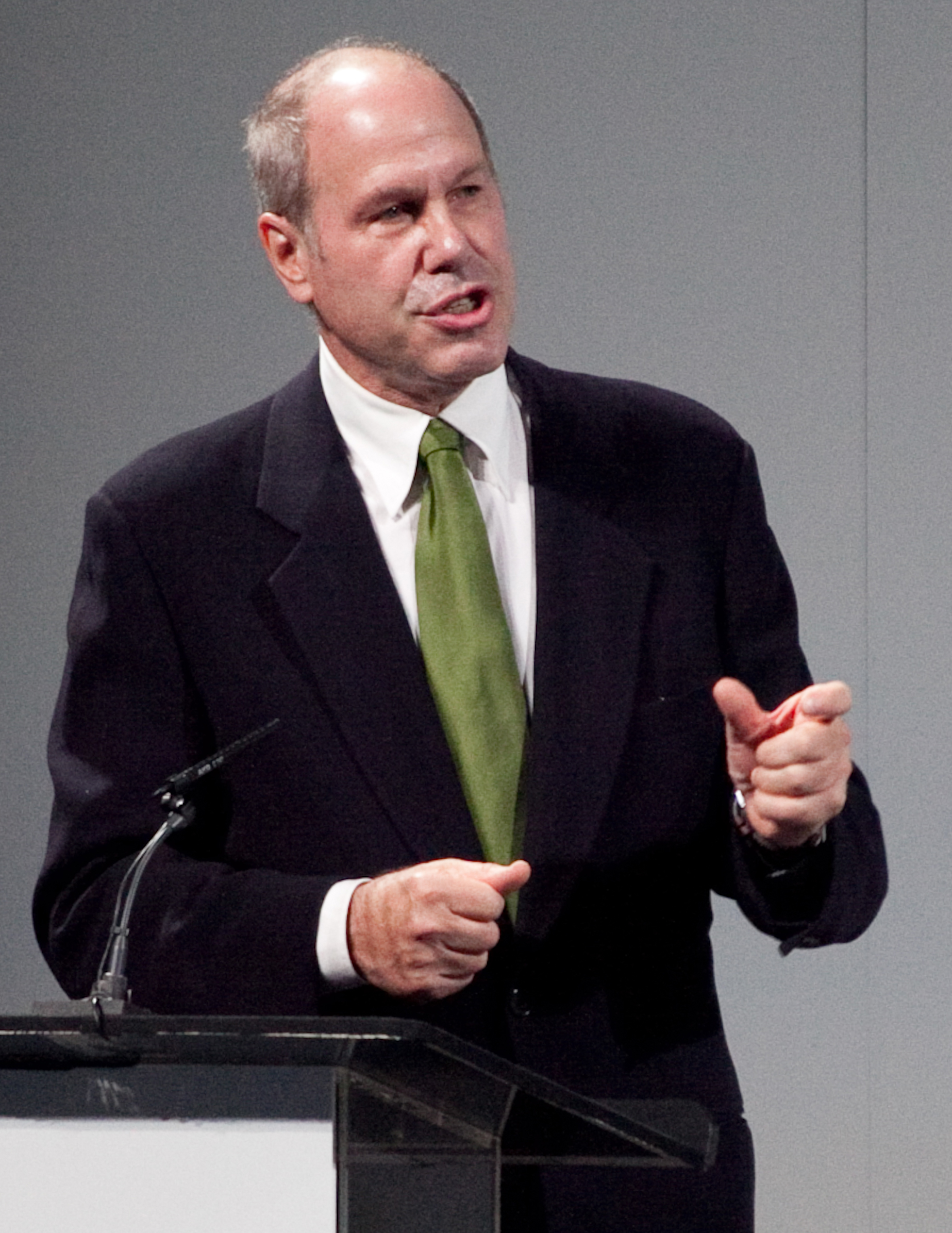
Walt Disney Company CEO Michael Eisner in October 2010

In 1977, Roy E. Disney, the son of Disney co-founder Roy O. Disney and nephew of Walt Disney, resigned as an executive due to disagreements with his colleagues' decisions at the time. As he claimed later, "I just felt creatively the company was not going anywhere interesting. It was very stifling." He retained a seat on the board of directors. His resignation from the board in 1984, which occurred in the midst of a corporate takeover battle, was the beginning of a series of developments that led to the replacement of company president and CEO Ronald William Miller (married to Walt's daughter Diane Marie Disney) by Michael Eisner, Frank Wells, & Jeffrey Katzenberg. Roy soon returned to the company as vice-chairman of the board of directors and head of the animation department.

Eisner has been criticized for his management style. The book DisneyWar by James B. Stewart is an exposé of Eisner's 20-year tenure as chairman and CEO at The Walt Disney Company. Stewart describes some of the following:

- The struggle to get Who Framed Roger Rabbit made in time and on budget despite the ambitions of Robert Zemeckis and Richard Williams to make the film bigger and bolder
- Eisner's tension with Frank Wells before Wells' death
- Eisner's friendship-turned-rivalry with Jeffrey Katzenberg
- Eisner's tension with Michael Ovitz during Ovitz's short-lived presidency
- The purchase of the ABC Family channel and its content and the fallout resulting from Disney's inability to revive it
- Hilary Duff's decision to quit the Disney Channel because of low salary
- Financing of the film Fahrenheit 9/11
- Pixar's decision not to renew its relationship with Disney
- The hostile takeover attempt by Comcast.

In 2003, Roy resigned from his positions as Disney vice chairman and chairman of Walt Disney Feature Animation, accusing Eisner of micromanagement, flops with the ABC television network, timidity in the theme park business, turning The Walt Disney Company into a "rapacious, soul-less" company, and refusing to establish a clear succession plan, as well as a string of box-office movie flops starting in the year 2000.

On March 3, 2004, at Disney's annual shareholders' meeting, a surprising 43% of Disney's shareholders, predominantly rallied by former board members Roy Disney and Stanley Gold, withheld their proxies to re-elect Eisner to the board. Disney's board then gave the chairmanship position to George J. Mitchell. However, the board did not immediately remove Eisner as chief executive.

On March 13, 2005, Eisner announced that he would step down as CEO one year before his contract expired. On September 30, Eisner resigned both as an executive and as a member of the board of directors, and, severing all formal ties with the company, he waived his contractual rights to perks such as the use of a corporate jet and an office at the company's Burbank headquarters. Eisner's replacement was his longtime assistant, Bob Iger.

== Television series ==
=== ABC Daytime ===
ABC Daytime scrapped a One Life to Live storyline, which depicted a school shooting rampage on the day of the Virginia Tech shooting on April 16, 2007. In August 2009, Frons announced that the production of All My Children would move from New York City to Los Angeles by the end of the year.

=== Jimmy Kimmel Live! ===
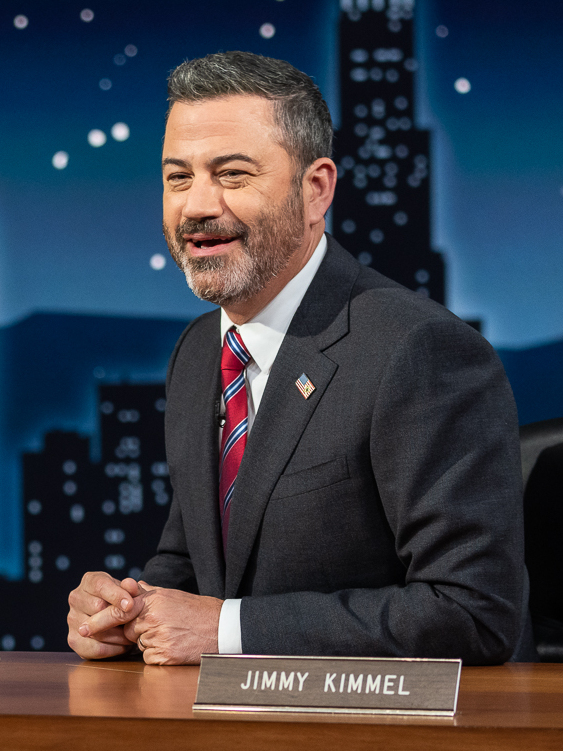
On September 17, 2025, the Walt Disney Company suspended Jimmy Kimmel Live, a late night talk show, after its host's monologue about U.S. president Donald Trump's reaction to the assassination of Charlie Kirk.

On September 17, 2025, the American Broadcasting Company (ABC) and its corporate parent, The Walt Disney Company, temporarily suspended production of the late-night talk show Jimmy Kimmel Live!, following criticism from conservatives and public pressure from Trump administration officials including Federal Communications Commission chair Brendan Carr over the host and comedian's monologue commentary about President Donald Trump and his supporters' reaction to the assassination of Charlie Kirk.

The network's suspension of Kimmel sparked widespread backlash from political leaders and commentators, entertainers, entertainment industry unions, constitutional scholars and the public as well as boycotts against Disney/ABC and broadcast station owners Nexstar Media Group and Sinclair Broadcast Group (whose respective decisions to pull Jimmy Kimmel Live! from their ABC-affiliated stations over his monologue remarks prompted the network's own decision to suspend the program), and sparked debate about the attempted erosion of First Amendment to the United States Constitution, notably freedom of speech in the United States and Freedom of the press in the United States amid calls by prominent conservatives to impose retaliatory and disciplinary actions against people celebrating, justifying, or trivializing Kirk's death or encourage further political violence.

There have been protests outside of Disney's offices both in Los Angeles and New York, with calls for boycotting Disney and cancelling streaming services have spread across social media, while Google searches for "cancel Disney Plus" and "cancel Hulu" have spiked. On Instagram, posts on the topic have comments about how users want to "stand for something" and "boycott all Disney movies." Multiple Reddit threads about canceling Disney+ have over 1,000 comments.

=== The View ===
In June 2006, host Star Jones prematurely announced her firing from The View, surprising her cohosts. In 2008, on The Oprah Winfrey Show, Barbara Walters told Oprah she felt "betrayed" by the announcement, and revealed Jones's gastric bypass surgery.

Also in 2006, host Rosie O'Donnell spoke in "mock Chinese", prompting complaints from UNITY: Journalists of Color and New York City councilman John C. Liu.

In 2013, anti-vaccine propagandist Jenny McCarthy was brought on to the panel. Critics called the decision "irresponsible".

In an ongoing controversy discussed since September 2025, the FCC announced February 6, 2026, that they are investigating The View over their adherence to new regulations from shifting equal-time laws, changed to favour Republican Party candidates by Donald Trump.

== Programming ==
=== ABC News ===
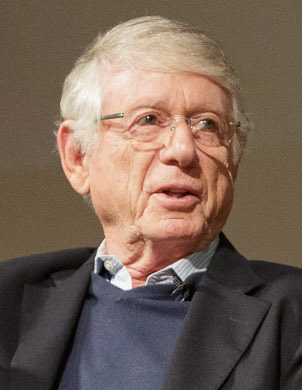
Nightline host Ted Koppel in December 2017

On April 30, 2004, Nightline host Ted Koppel read the names of the members of the United States Armed Forces who were killed in Iraq. This prompted controversy from conservatives, who believed that Koppel was making a political statement, and from Sinclair Broadcasting Group, which felt that ABC was undermining the Iraq war effort. Others, including a The Washington Post television columnist, thought it was a ratings stunt for sweeps, and indeed Nightline was the highest-rated program during that time period, and had about 30% more viewers than other Nightline programs that week. Sinclair stations did not air the program. Koppel repeated the format on May 28, 2004, reading the names of service members killed in Afghanistan, and on May 30, 2005, reading the names of all service members killed in Afghanistan or Iraq between the last program and the preparation of the program. This time, Sinclair stations aired the program as scheduled.

In the wake of the job cuts, a significant controversy erupted online in May 2010 after it was announced the former VP of news coverage, Mimi Gurbst, was leaving the network to become a guidance counselor. A story in the New York Observer reported that Gurbst was a "cherished" mentor inside the news division. Reporters who closely follow TV news observed that a large number of current and former ABC News staffers went online to vigorously respond that Gurbst had helped perpetuate a negative culture with ABC News.

=== The Path to 9/11 ===
ABC aired the controversial two-part miniseries The Path to 9/11 in the United States on September 10, 2006, at 8 p.m. EDT and September 11, 2006, at 8 p.m. EDT. The extensive pre-broadcast controversy over the film has included disputes over the accuracy of its dramatization of key events, as well as calls by historians and from former Clinton and Bush administration officials for ABC to re-edit part of the film or to not broadcast it at all. According to the official statement released by ABC on September 7, 2006, the film is a dramatization, not a documentary, drawn from a variety of sources, including the 9/11 Commission Report, other published materials, and personal interviews.

The main source of the controversy stems from portions of the film concerned with the Clinton administration in the 1990s. Critics say that certain dramatized scenes tend to suggest that blame for the events that took place on September 11, 2001, lies with Clinton and his cabinet. One example cited is a scene in which then-National Security Advisor Sandy Berger does not approve of the order to take out a surrounded Osama bin Laden, tells the squad in Afghanistan that they will have to do the job without official authorization and then hangs up the phone. According to Sandy Berger and others – including conservative author and Clinton critic Richard Miniter – this never happened. Screenwriter Cyrus Nowrasteh has now admitted that the abrupt hang-up was not in the script and was improvised.

=== Contract dispute affecting WABC-TV and WPVI ===
The logo of WPVI, the ABC television affiliate in Philadelphia

On March 2, 2010, two major ABC affiliate stations, WABC-TV in New York City and WPVI in Philadelphia, stated that they would pull their programming from Cablevision on March 7, 2010 (at midnight), unless a new payment structure was implemented for its network programming. Cablevision responded by citing WABC-TV and WPVI's free, over-the-air accessibility. Cablevision spokesman Charles Schueler stated, "It is not fair for ABC-Disney to hold Cablevision customers hostage by forcing them to pay what amounts to a new TV tax." Also that day, Cablevision announced through e-mail that their entire film catalog of on-demand movies would be available without charge until midnight that evening as an apology to their customers.

== Freeform ==
Fox Family Worldwide Inc. was sold from News Corporation's Fox Entertainment Group to Disney for US$2.9 billion on October 24, 2001. The sale to Disney also included television channel Fox Kids and Saban Entertainment (renamed BVS Entertainment). The entire network was officially renamed ABC Family on November 10, 2001.

The sale to Disney was considered one of the largest mistakes or problems occurring during the tenure of Michael Eisner. The failure was primarily due to the acquisition being done by the strategic planning department of Disney, without consulting anyone at ABC. The original plan was to use the channel to essentially show re-runs of ABC programming, but this plan was completely impossible since ABC had no syndication rights to the majority of their own programs. During this time, the network did air same-season repeats of Alias, Less Than Perfect, Life with Bonnie, and The Bachelor, almost all of which were Touchstone Television productions (The Bachelor is distributed by Time Warner's Telepictures). But in trying to change the focus of the channel, Disney also canceled several Fox Family series, like State of Grace, and cut back on the network's TV movies, which were among the few programs Fox Family was doing well with. The ratings tumbled further as the network became dependent on syndicated reruns and no original programs (save for original wrap-around segments around Bachelor repeats, and children's programming).

The next major plan was to reposition the channel to market it to college students, young women, or to a more hip audience under the name XYZ, a reverse reference to ABC. Disney soon found that the channel could never be renamed as such. The original sale from CBN to Fox/Saban contained a (now disputed) stipulation that the channel contains the word "Family" in the name forever, no matter who owns the network. To create XYZ, the Family Channel would have had to cease to exist – terminating all existing cable TV contracts – and XYZ would have to be created as a completely new network. Cable companies would not be obligated to put XYZ in the spot vacated by the Family Channel. ABC scrapped the idea after discovering this clause.

The name was revisited at one point in 2003, serving as a program block entitled "The XYZ", showing programs and movies aimed at the above groups. The network was also used as a buffer to burn off failed ABC series, such as All American Girl, which featured former Spice Girl Geri Halliwell.

Since 2006, the critics have gone after programming on ABC Family. Most critics of the network feel it has gone from a family friendly to "too risqué", and shows like Greek and The Secret Life of the American Teenager are far too racy for "family viewers". Critics feel that the executives at ABC Family are only after viewership numbers and are unconcerned about showing younger generations in questionable scenarios in series and films. The main focus of criticism is on teenage pregnancy or underage drinking.

== Miscellaneous criticisms and complaints ==
- Religious welfare groups such as the Catholic League have spoken out against the release of material which they and others found offensive, including vehement protests of the Miramax Films features Priest (1994) and Dogma (1999). Disney pushed back Dogma's release date due to the controversy surrounding the movie, and eventually sold the distribution rights to Lions Gate Films. The ABC show Nothing Sacred, about a Jesuit priest, a book called Growing Up Gay (published by Disney-owned Hyperion Press), the (unofficial) annual Gay and Lesbian Days at Disney theme parks, and similar issues spurred boycotts of Disney and its advertisers by the Catholic League, the Assemblies of God, and other conservative Christian groups.
- The Southern Baptist Convention (SBC) and the American Family Association voted to boycott Disney over opposition to Disney offering domestic partnership benefits to gay employees and over opposition to the ABC show Ellen, in which the show's star, Ellen DeGeneres, came out as lesbian. Both boycotts were withdrawn in 2005.
