= Medieval renaissances =

Periods of significant cultural renewal across medieval Western Europe

The medieval renaissances were periods of cultural renewal across medieval Western Europe. These are effectively seen as occurring in three phases: the Carolingian Renaissance (8th and 9th centuries), Ottonian Renaissance (10th century) and the Renaissance of the 12th century.

The term was first used by medievalists in the 19th century, by analogy with the historiographical concept of the 15th and 16th century Italian Renaissance. This was notable since it marked a break with the dominant historiography of the time, which saw the Middle Ages as a Dark Age. The term has always been a subject of debate and criticism, particularly on how widespread such renewal movements were and on the validity of comparing them with the Renaissance of the Post-Medieval Early modern period.

== History of the concept ==
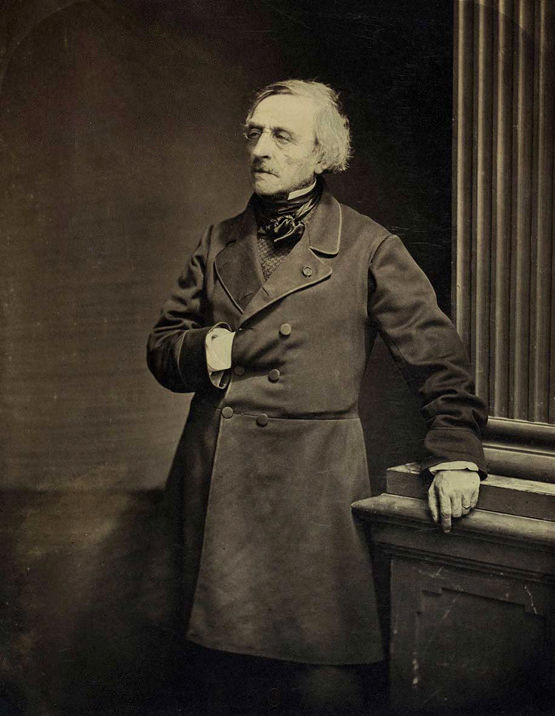
Jean-Jacques Ampère was the first writer to speak of a medieval renaissance.

The use of the term "renaissance" in medieval history emerged in the 19th century alongside the development of medieval studies. Jean-Jacques Ampère first employed it in the 1830s, referring to a Carolingian Renaissance and a 12th-century renaissance. In doing so, Ampère countered the prevailing view of the Middle Ages as a culturally regressive period, as notably advanced by Jules Michelet. Although occasionally adopted by other 19th-century authors, the concept was not widely applied to specific moments in medieval cultural history until the 20th century, beginning in the 1920s.

Erna Patzelt applied the concept to the Carolingian era in 1924, Hans Naumann used it for the Ottonian period in 1927, and Charles H. Haskins published his influential work The Renaissance of the Twelfth Century in 1927. Three medieval renaissances were thus established, corresponding to the 8th, 10th, and 12th centuries.

The terms Carolingian Renaissance, Ottonian Renaissance, and 12th-century Renaissance must be distinguished from the work of historians such as Jacob Burckhardt, who sought medieval roots for the 16th-century Renaissance. The concept of medieval renaissances draws on the latter but applies the idea of cultural renewal to other periods, highlighting shared features such as the influence of classical antiquity and its study. It does not refer to "pre-Renaissances," a term more suited to the Italian Trecento. Beyond these three periods, the term "renaissance" gained traction among medievalists for various eras: a Vandal renaissance in 6th-century Africa, an Isidorian renaissance in 7th-century Visigothic Spain, a Northumbrian renaissance in the 8th century, and others. It also appears in late antique history with a Constantinian renaissance and in Byzantine history, notably the Macedonian Renaissance. This proliferation reflects the enduring presence of classical references throughout the Middle Ages.

Comparisons between medieval renaissances and the 16th-century Renaissance require caution. Medieval renaissances are discussed by specialists in cultural, educational, and intellectual history and are not portrayed as widespread, coherent developments across medieval Western society—only the 12th-century renaissance coincides with major economic and social transformations. These phenomena lack the highly secularized humanism of the 16th century. The term "renaissance," without a Latin equivalent, aligns with the contemporary notion of cultural renovatio, but in the Middle Ages, it remains tied to the idea of ecclesiastical and Christian societal reformatio. Medieval renaissances thus belong to a continuous process of religious transformation. They also differ from the 16th-century Renaissance in strengthening monastic and episcopal schools, contrasting with the later separation of science and teaching.

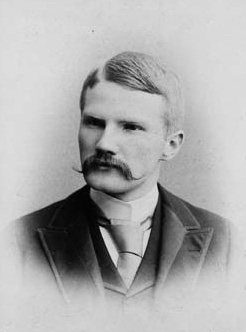
Charles H. Haskins published The Renaissance of the Twelfth Century in 1927

== Pre-Carolingian renaissances ==
As Pierre Riché points out, the expression "Carolingian Renaissance" does not imply that Western Europe was barbaric or obscurantist before the Carolingian era. The centuries following the collapse of the Roman Empire in the West did not see an abrupt disappearance of the ancient schools, from which emerged Martianus Capella, Cassiodorus and Boethius, essential icons of the Roman cultural heritage in the Middle Ages, thanks to which the disciplines of liberal arts were preserved. The fall of the Western Roman Empire saw the "Vandal Renaissance" of Kings Thrasamund and Hilderic in late 5th and early 6th century North Africa, where ambitious architectural projects were commissioned, the Vandal kings dressed in Roman imperial style with Roman triumphal rulership symbols, and intellectual traditions, poetry and literature flourished. Classical education and the Romano-African elite's opulent lifestyle were maintained, as seen in the plentiful classicizing texts which emerged in this period. The 7th century saw the "Isidorian Renaissance" in the Visigothic Kingdom of Hispania in which sciences flourished and the integration of Christian and pre-Christian thought occurred, while the spread of Irish monastic schools (scriptoria) over Europe laid the groundwork for the Carolingian Renaissance. There was a similar flourishing in the Northumbrian Renaissance of the 7th and 8th centuries.

== Medieval periods of renaissance ==
=== Renaissances before Charlemagne? ===
Even before Charlemagne, the growth of monastic and episcopal schools in the West—a process starting in the 6th century—led to periods of genuine dynamism in certain cultural centers. This gave rise to terms such as the "Isidorian renaissance" for Visigothic Spain or the "Northumbrian renaissance" (or more broadly Anglo-Saxon) during the era of Bede. The term could also apply to Italy or Gaul in the 8th century. Pierre Riché groups these various renewals into a single, nearly simultaneous movement, a "prelude to the great Carolingian renewal," peaking between 680 and 700.

Should these be viewed as isolated renaissances or precursors to the Carolingian Renaissance? For the Isidorian renaissance, significant limitations exist. Isidore of Seville appears isolated, with Zaragoza and later Toledo becoming the main Visigothic study centers amid threats from Arab expansion in southern Spain. Isidore's humanistic culture, blending Christian and pagan classical elements, remained confined to a small elite. Knowledge of Greek and Hebrew, essential for biblical interpretation, was minimal despite Byzantine and Jewish presence.

The Anglo-Saxon case highlights further constraints. Figures in the Northumbrian renaissance, such as Aldhelm and Bede, opposed classical culture and the liberal arts, focusing on biblical studies and rejecting rhetoric and dialectic as tools for heretics. Its influence was limited among English clergy and laity.

Continued growth in 8th-century Gaul primarily prepared the Carolingian renewal, introducing political reformist will alongside widespread monastic culture.

== Carolingian Renaissance (8th and 9th centuries) ==
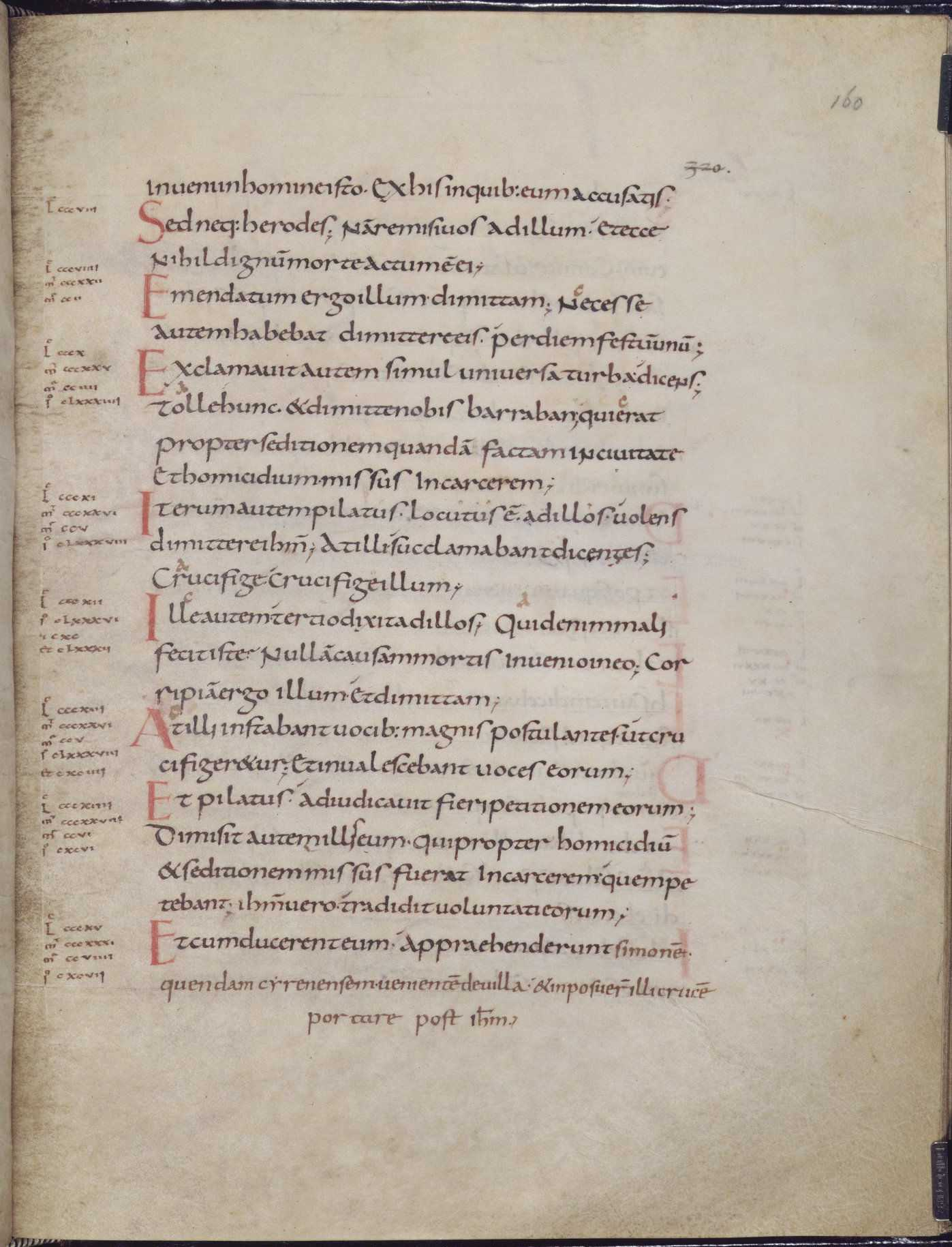
Carolingian minuscule, one of the products of the Carolingian Renaissance.

The Carolingian Renaissance was a period of intellectual and cultural revival in the Carolingian Empire occurring from the late eighth century to the ninth century, as the first of three medieval renaissances. It occurred mostly during the reigns of the Carolingian rulers Charlemagne and Louis the Pious. It was supported by the scholars of the Carolingian court, notably Alcuin of York For moral betterment the Carolingian renaissance reached for models drawn from the example of the Christian Roman Empire of the 4th century. During this period there was an increase of literature, writing, the arts, architecture, jurisprudence, liturgical reforms and scriptural studies. Charlemagne's Admonitio generalis (789) and his Epistola de litteris colendis served as manifestos. The effects of this cultural revival, however, were largely limited to a small group of court literati: "it had a spectacular effect on education and culture in Francia, a debatable effect on artistic endeavors, and an immeasurable effect on what mattered most to the Carolingians, the moral regeneration of society," John Contreni observes. Beyond their efforts to write better Latin, to copy and preserve patristic and classical texts and to develop a more legible, classicizing script—the Carolingian minuscule that Renaissance humanists took to be Roman and employed as humanist minuscule, from which has developed early modern Italic script—the secular and ecclesiastical leaders of the Carolingian Renaissance for the first time in centuries applied rational ideas to social issues, providing a common language and writing style that allowed for communication across most of Europe.

One of the primary efforts was the creation of a standardized curriculum for use at the recently created schools. Alcuin led this effort and was responsible for the writing of textbooks, creation of word lists, and establishing the trivium and quadrivium as the basis for education.

While a substantial portion of the classical corpus that it is possessed today owes its survival to the copies produced by Carolingian scribes, the use of the term renaissance to describe this period is contested because its aims and output differ markedly from those of the 15th- and 16th-century Renaissance. The Carolingian project was a top-down initiative, driven by royal patronage and executed by literate elites who trained and served in ecclesiastical institutions, in contrast to the wide-ranging social movements of the later Italian Renaissance. Earlier scholarship sometimes portrayed the Carolingian period as an attempt to recreate the previous culture of the Roman Empire, motivated by humanist and antiquarian interests. More recent historiography, however, tends to view the Carolingian Renaissance primarily as a religious reform project. Rather than a pure revival, Carolingian scholars described their engagement with classical learning as correctio. This notion of correctio, combined with pragmatic concerns, aimed to "correct" and transform older knowledge into something useful and suitable for a newly unified Christian society—society whose salvation Charlemagne, as its ruler, felt personally responsible for.

Similar processes occurred in Southeast Europe with the Christianization of Bulgaria and the introduction liturgy in Old Bulgarian language and the Cyrillic script created in Bulgaria few years before the reign of Simeon I of Bulgaria, during the reign of his father Boris I of Bulgaria. Clement of Ohrid and Naum of Preslav created (or rather compiled) the new alphabet which was called Cyrillic and was declared the official alphabet in Bulgaria in 893. The Old Church Slavonic language was declared as official in the same year. In the following centuries the liturgy in Bulgarian language and the alphabet were adopted by many other Slavic peoples and counties. The Golden Age of medieval Bulgarian culture is the period of the Bulgarian cultural prosperity during the reign of emperor Simeon I the Great (889—927). The term was coined by Spiridon Palauzov in the mid 19th century. During this period there was an increase of literature, writing, arts, architecture and liturgical reforms.

== Ottonian Renaissance (10th and 11th centuries) ==
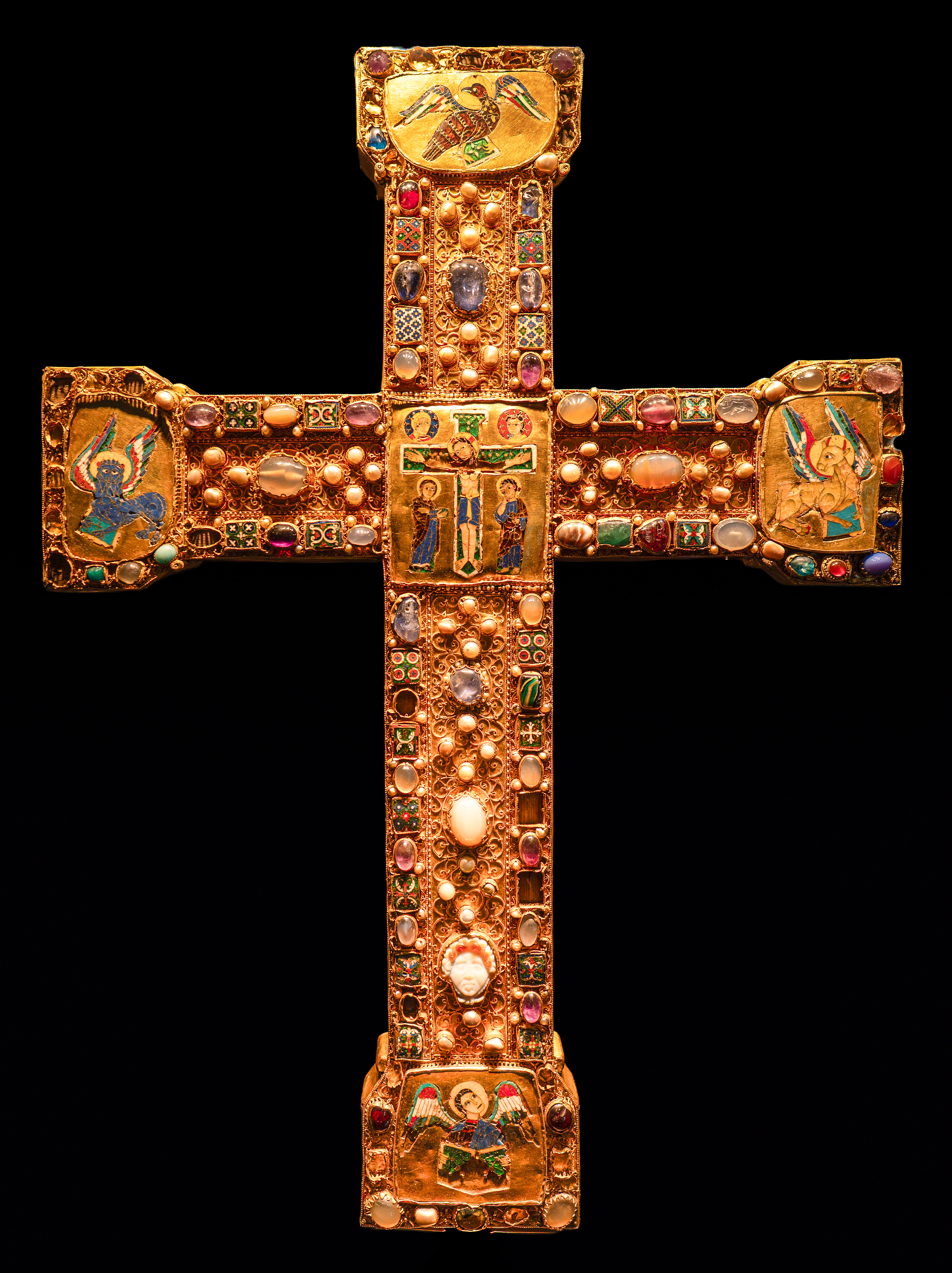
Enamel processional cross (Senkschmelzen-Kreuz), former Essen Abbey, about 1000

The Ottonian Renaissance was a limited renaissance of logic, science, economy and art in central and southern Europe that accompanied the reigns of the first three emperors of the Saxon Dynasty, all named Otto: Otto I (936–973), Otto II (973–983), and Otto III (983–1002), and which in large part depended upon their patronage. Pope Sylvester II and Abbo of Fleury were leading figures in this movement. The Ottonian Renaissance began after Otto's marriage to Adelaide (951) united the kingdoms of Italy and Germany and thus brought the West closer to Byzantium and furthered the cause of Christian (political) unity with his imperial coronation in 963. The period is sometimes extended to cover the reign of Henry II as well, and, rarely, the Salian dynasts. The term is generally confined to Imperial court culture conducted in Latin in Germany. It is sometimes also known as the Renaissance of the 10th century, so as to include developments outside Germania, or as the Year 1000 Renewal, due to coming right at the end of the 10th century. It was shorter than the preceding Carolingian Renaissance and to a large extent a continuation of it - this has led historians such as Pierre Riché to prefer evoking it as a 'third Carolingian renaissance', covering the 10th century and running over into the 11th century, with the 'first Carolingian renaissance' occurring during Charlemagne's own reign and the 'second Carolingian renaissance' happening under his successors. The Ottonian Renaissance is recognized especially in the arts and architecture, invigorated by renewed contact with Constantinople, in some revived cathedral schools, such as that of Bruno of Cologne, in the production of illuminated manuscripts from a handful of elite scriptoria, such as Quedlinburg, founded by Otto in 936, and in political ideology. The Imperial court became the center of religious and spiritual life, led by the example of women of the royal family: Matilda the literate mother of Otto I, or his sister Gerberga of Saxony, or his consort Adelaide, or Empress Theophanu.

== 12th-century Renaissance ==
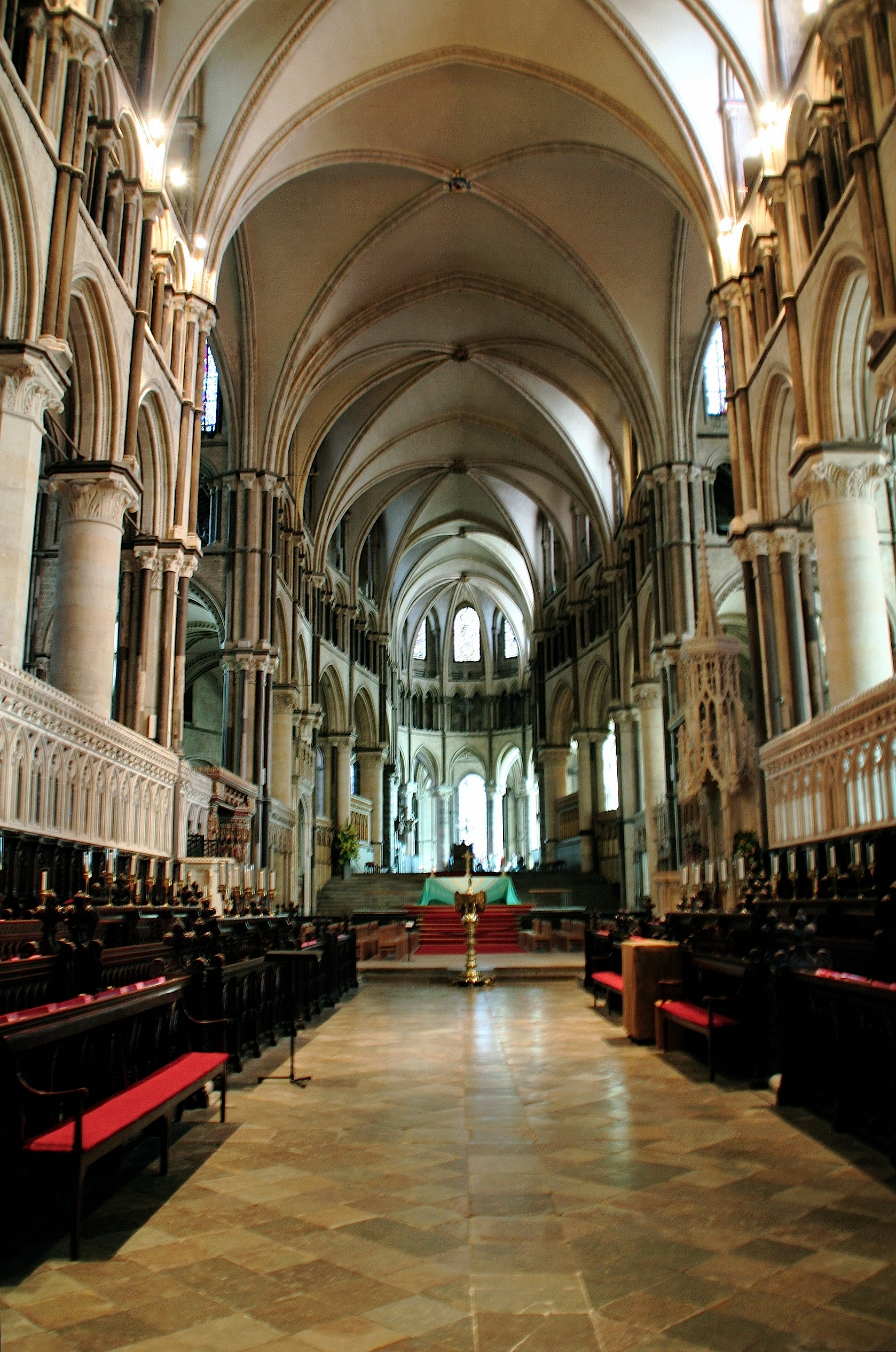
New technological discoveries allowed the development of Gothic architecture

The Renaissance of the 12th century was a period of many changes at the outset of the High Middle Ages. It included social, political and economic transformations, and an intellectual revitalization of Western Europe with strong philosophical and scientific roots. For some historians these changes paved the way to later achievements such as the literary and artistic movement of the Italian Renaissance in the 15th century and the scientific developments of the 17th century.

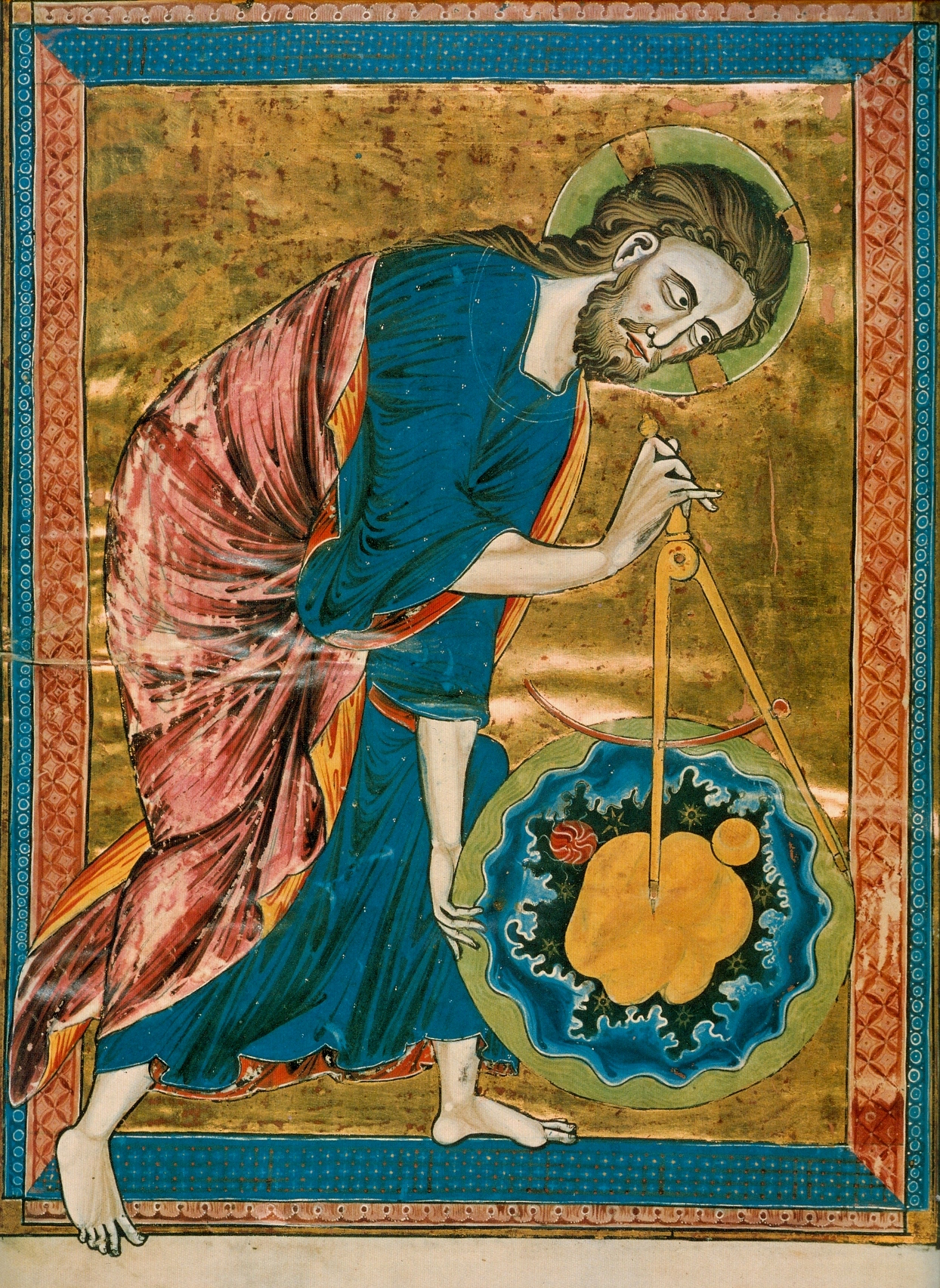
Medieval scholars sought to understand the geometric and harmonic principles by which God created the universe.

After the collapse of the Western Roman Empire, Western Europe had entered the Middle Ages with great difficulties. Apart from depopulation and other factors, most classical scientific treatises of classical antiquity, written in Greek, had become unavailable. Philosophical and scientific teaching of the Early Middle Ages was based upon the few Latin translations and commentaries on ancient Greek scientific and philosophical texts that remained in the Latin West.

This scenario changed during the renaissance of the 12th century. The increased contact with the Islamic world in Spain and Sicily, the Crusades, the Reconquista, as well as increased contact with Byzantium, allowed Europeans to seek and translate the works of Hellenic and Islamic philosophers and scientists, especially the works of Aristotle.

The development of medieval universities allowed them to aid materially in the translation and propagation of these texts and started a new infrastructure which was needed for scientific communities. In fact, the European university put many of these texts at the center of its curriculum, with the result that the "medieval university laid far greater emphasis on science than does its modern counterpart and descendent."

In Northern Europe, the Hanseatic League was founded in the 12th century, with the foundation of the city of Lübeck in 1158–1159. Many northern cities of the Holy Roman Empire became Hanseatic cities, including Hamburg, Stettin, Bremen and Rostock. Hanseatic cities outside the Holy Roman Empire were, for instance, Bruges, London and the Polish city of Danzig (Gdańsk). In Bergen and Novgorod the league had factories and middlemen. In this period the Germans started colonizing Eastern Europe beyond the Empire, into Prussia and Silesia. In the late 13th century Westerners became more aware of the Far East. Marco Polo is the most commonly known documenter due to his popular book Il Milione but he was neither the first nor the only traveller on the Silk Road to China.

Several Christian missionaries such as William of Rubruck, Giovanni da Pian del Carpini, Andrew of Longjumeau, Odoric of Pordenone, Giovanni de Marignolli, Giovanni di Monte Corvino, and other travelers such as Niccolò da Conti also contributed to the knowledge and interest in the far eastern lands.

The translation of texts from other cultures, especially ancient Greek works, was an important aspect of both this Twelfth-Century Renaissance and the latter Renaissance (of the 15th century), the relevant difference being that Latin scholars of this earlier period focused almost entirely on translating and studying Greek and Arabic works of natural science, philosophy and mathematics, while the latter Renaissance focus was on literary and historical texts.

A new method of learning called scholasticism developed in the late 12th century from the rediscovery of the works of Aristotle; the works of medieval Jewish and Islamic thinkers influenced by him, notably Maimonides, Avicenna (see Avicennism) and Averroes (see Averroism); and the Christian philosophers influenced by them, most notably Albertus Magnus, Bonaventure and Abélard. Those who practiced the scholastic method believed in empiricism and supporting Roman Catholic doctrines through secular study, reason, and logic. Other notable scholastics ("schoolmen") included Roscelin and Peter Lombard. One of the main questions during this time was the problem of the universals. Prominent non-scholastics of the time included Anselm of Canterbury, Peter Damian, Bernard of Clairvaux, and the Victorines. The most famous of the scholastic practitioners was Thomas Aquinas (later declared a Doctor of the Church), who led the move away from the Platonic and Augustinian and towards the Aristotelian.

During the High Middle Ages in Europe, there was increased innovation in means of production, leading to economic growth. These innovations included the windmill, manufacturing of paper, the spinning wheel, the magnetic compass, eyeglasses, the astrolabe, and Hindu-Arabic numerals.

== See also ==
- Architecture of the Tarnovo Artistic School
- Art School of Tarnovo
- Continuity thesis
- Golden Age of medieval Bulgarian culture
- Macedonian Renaissance
- Painting of the Tarnovo Artistic School
- Palaeologan Renaissance
- Tarnovo Literary School
- Byzantine civilisation in the 12th century
