= Rue89 =

French news website

- Website type: News website
- Available in: French
- Creators: Pierre Haski, Pascal Riché, Arnaud Aubron, Michel Lévy-Provençal, and Laurent Mauriac
- Website: www.nouvelobs.com/rue89/
- Commercial: yes
- Launched: 6 May 2007; 19 years ago

Rue89 is a French news website started by former journalists from the newspaper Libération. It was officially launched on 6 May 2007, on the day of the second round of the French presidential election. Its news editor is Pascal Riché, former op-ed editor of Libération, and its chief editor. The president of the society Rue89 is Pierre Haski, the former deputy editor of Libération.

== History ==
Rue89 was co-founded by Pierre Haski, Pascal Riché, Arnaud Aubron, Michel Lévy-Provençal, and Laurent Mauriac. Libération, which had been bought back by Édouard de Rothschild, was then in the turmoil of a crisis, which included a plan of downsizing and the voluntary resignation of a number of its long-standing employees. As soon as 14 May 2007, Rue89 published its first scoop, taken up by the rest of the French press, which concerned the censorship of an article which was to be published by Le Journal du Dimanche, owned by Arnaud Lagardère, who is close to Sarkozy. The suppressed article spoke about the abstention of Cécilia Sarkozy, the wife of the new President Nicolas Sarkozy, at the second round of the presidential election.

On 5 September 2007, Pascal Riché revealed that Alexis Debat, a collaborator of The National Interest and of ABC News, had signed a false interview of Barack Obama, published in Politique Internationale. The article underlined a number of incoherencies concerning Debat's alleged Curriculum Vitae. Rue89's scoop was taken up by The Washington Post, and Debat resigned from The National Interest.

In February 2008, Michel Lévy-Provençal, one of the founders, who left when the website was launched, sold his shares and criticized Rue89 for being a "marketing success" but a journalistic failure.

In October 2008, Rue89 launched Eco89, a news site dedicated to economics.

In June 2010, Rue89 launched a monthly paper.

In December 2011, Rue89 was bought by Claude Perdriel, owner of the weekly Le Nouvel Observateur for €7.5 million.

In April 2012, Rue89 ceased its monthly print issue. The same year the website won the general excellence award in non-English online journalism.

In March 2014, Rue89 and the Global Editors Network launched the first French MOOC about digital journalism.

As of March 2015, after refocusing on the so-called "digital revolution" in late 2014, Rue89 global audience is far behind other French online newspapers such as the Huffington Post France.

In January 2017, only four journalists were still working for Rue89 and the website was virtually dead.

== Name ==
According to its editor, Pascal Riché, the name Rue89 has been chosen as a reference to freedom, through French Revolution (1789) and the fall of the Berlin Wall (1989) as much as the symbolism of the street (French: rue) as a place of meeting and discussion.

== Founders ==
- Pierre Haski, president of the society Rue89 and editor-in-chief (directeur de la publication)
- Pascal Riché, news editor (rédacteur en chef)
- Arnaud Aubron, webmaster/editor
- Michel Lévy-Provençal
- Laurent Mauriac, CFO

== Team ==
- Mathieu Deslandes, deputy news editor
- Zineb Dryef, journalist

== See also ==
- Bakchich, another news website founded in 2006
