= Pierre Haski =

French journalist, co-founder of Rue 89 (born 1953)

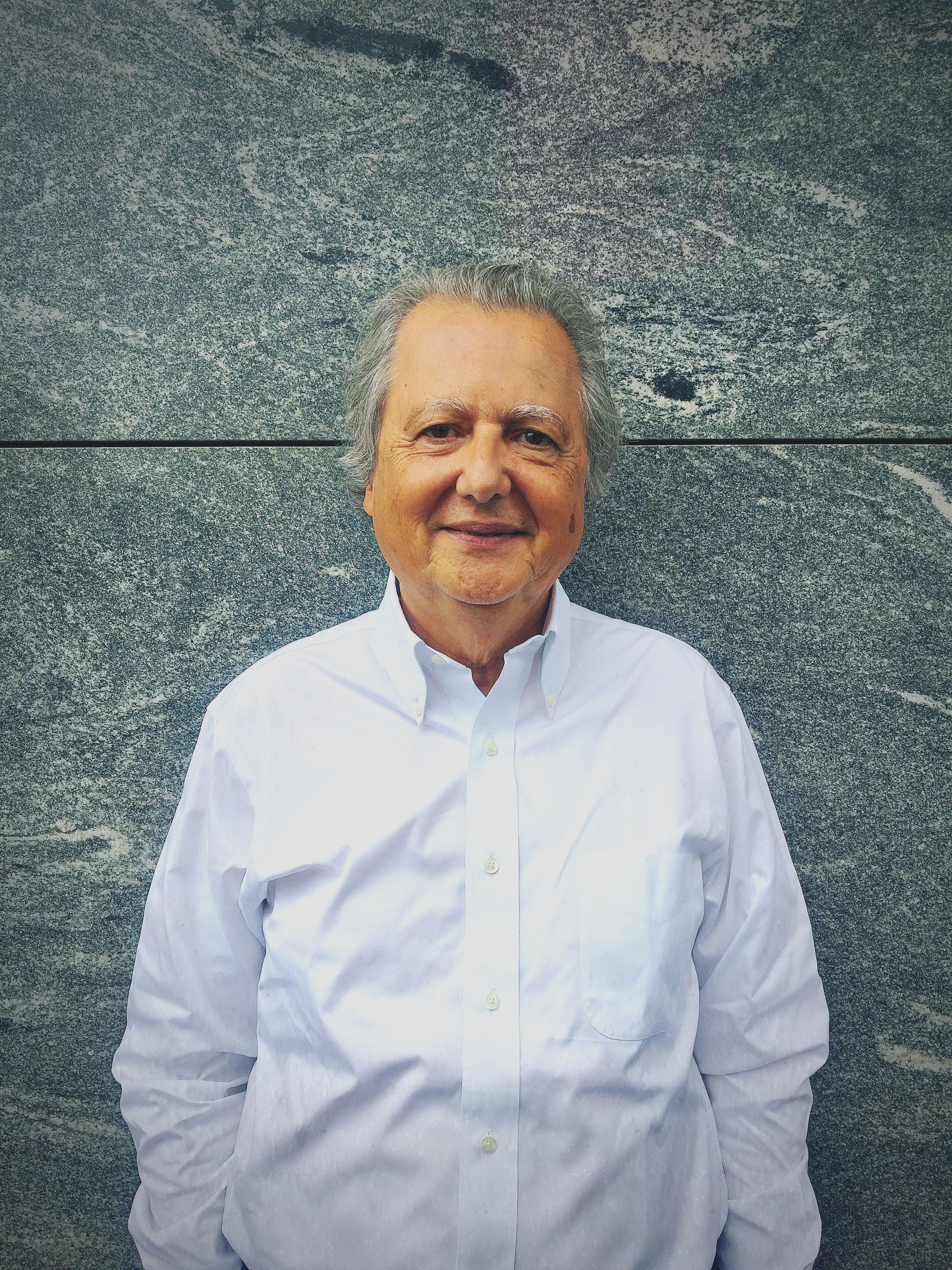
- Haski in 2021
- Born: 8 April 1953 (age 73); Tunis, Tunisia
- Education: Centre de formation des journalistes
- Occupation: Journalist
- Known for: Co-founder of Rue 89; President of Reporters without Borders

Pierre Haski (born 8 April 1953) is a French journalist and co-founder of Rue89. He was deputy editor of Libération from January 2006 till his departure in 2007 from the daily. He became president of the Reporters Without Borders association in 2017.

== Life ==
Haski started his career in 1974 as a journalist for the Agence France-Presse (AFP), and was its correspondent in South Africa from 1976 to 1980. He then joined the staff of the daily Libération in 1981. At first responsible of the Africa section, he then was charged of its diplomatic section between 1988 and 1993. Haski went on a number of international assignments, corresponding from South Africa, Jerusalem (1993–1995), and China (2000–2005), and serving as head of the foreign correspondent division from 1995 to 2000. He was stationed in Beijing from 2000 through 2005, during which he posted a blog on the newspaper's website, Mon Journal de Chine ("My Journal from China"), which access was blocked by the Chinese authorities. During his time in China, he came across the diary of a schoolgirl in a remote province, which he edited and published in the West as The Diary of Ma Yan. From January 2006 to 2007, he was deputy chief-editor of Libération.

In the turmoil of the crisis at Libération, he resigned from his functions in 2007 and co-founded, in March 2007, the Internet newspaper Rue 89, along with Arnaud Aubron, Michel Lévy-Provençal, Laurent Mauriac, Nicole Pénicaut and Pascal Riché. In September 2007, he also worked for Europe 1 radio.

He became president of the Reporters Without Borders association in 2017. Since August 2018, he has been the geopolitical columnist for the morning show Le 7/9 (which became Le 7/9.30 then Le 7/10) on France Inter.

== Books ==
- Ma, Yan, and Pierre Haski (2005). The Diary of Ma Yan: The Struggles and Hopes of a Chinese Schoolgirl. HarperCollins. ISBN 0-06-076496-1. ISBN 978-0-06-076496-8.
- Pierre Haski (2025).

Décolonisations Africaines Preface de Pap Ndiaye. Stock|France Inter. ISBN 978-2-234-09649-3

== Films ==
- "Nous sommes Taïwan" (2023)
