= The Diary of Ma Yan =

- Cover of English-language edition
- Author: Ma Yan
- Original title: 马燕日记
- Publisher: Haski
- Publication date: 2005

The Diary of Ma Yan: The Struggles and Hopes of a Chinese School Girl (马燕日记) is the published diary of Ma Yan (马燕), a Chinese schoolgirl from a small village in the Ningxia Hui Autonomous Region, China.

== Background ==
In March 2001, French journalist Pierre Haski was filming a documentary about Chinese Muslims in Zhangjiakou (张家树), a remote rural village in Ningxia. During his stay in the modest home of the village imam, Haski observed the challenging living conditions faced by the community, including poverty and limited access to basic necessities such as drinking water and education. Despite these hardships, the villagers were hospitable to Haski and his team.

As the team was preparing to leave, Ma Yan's mother handed them her 13-year-old daughter's handwritten diaries, pleading for their help. In Shanghai, Haski and his team reviewed the diaries and were deeply moved by Ma Yan's heartfelt writings. In her entries, Ma Yan detailed her struggles and her strong desire to continue her education despite her family's severe financial difficulties. Her family had been forced to withdraw her from school because they could not afford the fees.

The diaries were later edited and published in France by Haski, bringing international attention to Ma Yan's story.

In the summer of 2002, the Children of Ningxia fund was established to support Ma Yan and other children in similar circumstances by providing financial aid for education. Since its initial release, The Diary of Ma Yan has been translated into 17 languages and has sold over 200,000 copies worldwide.
