= Pascal Riché =

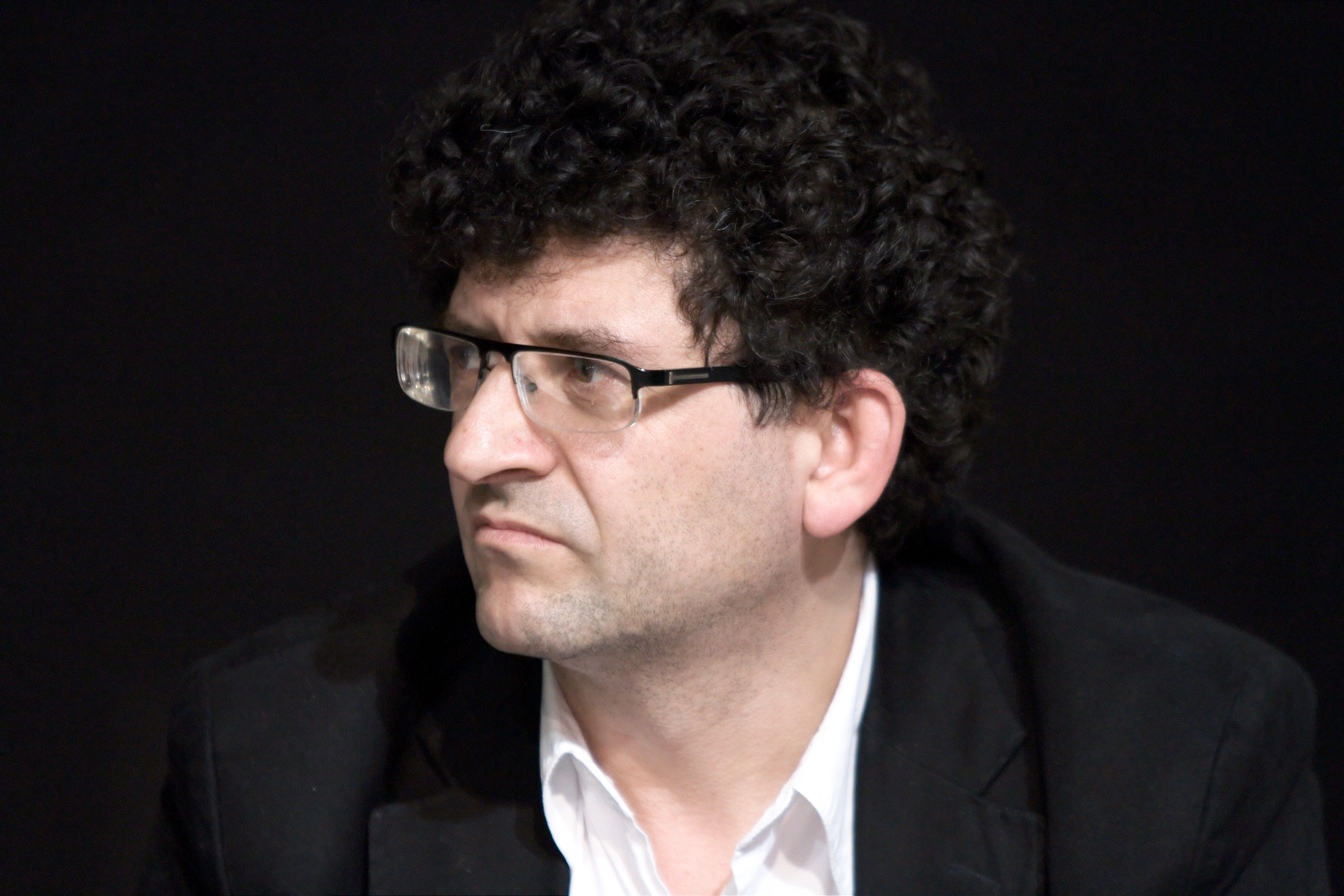
- Riché in 2010
- Born: June 1962 (age 63); France
- Education: Sciences Po
- Occupation: Journalist
- Father: Pierre Riché

Pascal Riché (French pronunciation: [paskal ʁiʃe]; born June 1962) is a French journalist, co-founder of Rue89 along with Arnaud Aubron, Laurent Mauriac, and Pierre Haski. He is currently the deputy editor of L'Obs (previously known as Le Nouvel Observateur).

== Life ==
Pascal Riché is a former alumnus of Sciences Po and of the Centre de formation des journalistes (CFJ) journalism school. He started his journalistic career in Ouest-France, the largest regional newspaper in France, and La Tribune de l'Economie, before joining Libération in 1989. There, he headed the economy service until 2000, when he was named Washington bureau chief (2000–2006). He then became Op-ed editor of the daily.

Following the crisis at Libération, Riché resigned from his functions and co-founded the Internet newspaper Rue 89 in March 2007.

He also has been a columnist for several media : DS magazine, TPMCafe, France Culture, Radio Nova.

He is the son of the medievalist historian Pierre Riché.

== Bibliography ==
He is the author of L'union monétaire de l'Europe, with Charles Wyplosz, and La Guerre de Sept ans, histoire secrète du franc fort 1989-1996 with Eric Aeschimann, which earned the 1997 Turgot Prize of the Best economic book of the year.
