= Aimoin =

Aimoin is a given name. Notable people with the name include:

- Aimoin of Saint-Germain-des-Prés (died 889), 9th-century monk and hagiographer
- Aimoin of Fleury (c. 960–c. 1010), 10th-century French chronicler
