= Thérèse Delpech =

Thérèse Delpech (11 February 1948 – 17 January 2012) was a French international relations expert and prolific public intellectual. Thèrese Delpech graduated from the École Normale Supérieure and went on to pass the agrégation of philosophy. During the rest of her career, she concentrated on international relations issues. Delpech had been director of strategic studies at the French Atomic Energy Commission (CEA) from 1997. She served as an adviser to Alain Juppé during his tenure as prime minister (1995–1997). She was also a researcher with CERI at Sciences Po, a commissioner with the United Nations Monitoring, Verification and Inspection Commission, and an international adviser to the International Committee of the Red Cross, and was "one of France's foremost thinkers on international security." Breaking with many French intellectuals she supported the 2003 American-led intervention in Iraq and has since advocated stronger sanctions against Iran.

She was ranked 81 in the Prospect Magazine 2008 Top 100 Public Intellectuals Poll. In 2012, RAND posthumously published what will perhaps be her last book, a detailed study of decades of RAND literature on nuclear deterrence.

== Bibliography ==
- Iran and the Bomb : The Abdication of International Responsibility (Translator: Ros Schwartz) February 2009
- Savage Century : Back to Barbarism (Translator: George Holoch) September 2008
- La Politica Del Caos June 2003

== See also ==
- Nuclear program of Iran
- Politics of France
