= Hans Naumann =

German historian (1886–1951)

Hans Naumann (May 13, 1886 – September 25, 1951) was a German literary historian (philologist) and folklorist (Germanist). Naumann was the first historian to describe the Ottonian period as a medieval renaissance.

Naumann was born in Görlitz and died in Bonn. Being a member of the Nazi Party, Naumann was a strong proponent of the book burning.

== Literary works ==
- Grundzüge der deutschen Volkskunde, 1922
- Deutsche Dichtung der Gegenwart, 1923
- Germanischer Schicksalsglaube, 1934
