= Libération =

French daily newspaper founded in 1973

- Front page from 2 November 2015
- Type: Daily newspaper
- Format: Compact
- Owner: Bruno Ledoux
- Editor: Dov Alfon
- Founded: 1973; 53 years ago
- Political alignment: Centre-left
- Language: French
- Headquarters: Paris, France
- Country: France
- Circulation: 97,633 (total, 2022); 9,900 (digital, 2018)
- ISSN: 0335-1793 (print); 2262-4767 (web)
- Website: liberation.fr

Libération (French: [libeʁɑsjɔ̃]), popularly known as Libé (French: [libe]), is a daily newspaper in France, founded in Paris by Jean-Paul Sartre and Serge July in 1973 in the wake of the protest movements of May 1968. Initially positioned on the far left of France's political spectrum, the editorial line evolved towards a more centre-left stance at the end of the 1970s, where it remains as of 2012.

The publication describes its "DNA" as being "liberal libertarian". It aims to act as a common platform for the diverse tendencies within the French Left, with its "compass" being "the defence of freedoms and of minorities". Edouard de Rothschild's acquisition of a 37% capital interest in 2005, and editor Serge July's campaign for the "yes" vote in the referendum establishing a Constitution for Europe the same year, alienated it from a number of its left-wing readers.

In its early days, it was noted for its irreverent and humorous style and unorthodox journalistic culture. All employees, including management, received the same salary. In addition to traditional editor's notes, known as Note de la rédaction and marked as N.D.L.R., it included the innovative NDLC (note de la claviste), apt and witty comments inserted at the last moment by the typesetter. It was the first French daily to have a website. It had a circulation of about 67,000 in 2018. Libération has been considered a newspaper of record in France.

== History ==
=== First period (1973–81) ===
Libération was founded by Jean-Paul Sartre, Philippe Gavi, Bernard Lallement, Jean-Claude Vernier, Pierre Victor alias Benny Lévy and Serge July and was first published on 3 February 1973, in the wake of the protest movements of May 1968. Sartre remained editor of Libération until 24 May 1974. During this period one of the contributors was Samir Frangieh, a leftist Lebanese journalist.

The paper was initially run along non-hierarchical lines, with all staff – from the editor-in-chief to the janitor – receiving the same salary, but this later gave way to a "normal set-up". In the early 1980s it began to take advertisements and allowed external bodies to have a stake in its financing, which it had completely refused before, but continued to maintain a left leaning editorial stance.

=== Second period (since 1981) ===
After several crises, Libération temporarily stopped being published in February 1981. It resumed publication on 13 May under a new format, with Serge July as new director.

Although Libération is not affiliated with any political party, it has, from its theoretical origins in the May 1968 turmoil in France, a left-wing slant. According to co-founder and former director Serge July, Libé was an activist newspaper that, however, does not support any particular political party, acts as a counter-power, and generally has bad relations with both left-wing and right-wing administrations. Libé's opinion pages (rebonds) publish views from many political standpoints. An example of their proclaimed independent, "counter-power" slant is when in 1993 Libération leaked Socialist president François Mitterrand's illegal wiretapping program.

Libération is known for its sometimes alternative points of view on cultural and social events. For instance, in addition to reports about crimes and other events, it also chronicles daily criminal trials, bringing in a more human vision of petty criminals. As Serge July puts it, "the equation of Libération consisted in combining counter-culture and political radicalism". The editors' decision, in 2005, to support the Treaty establishing a Constitution for Europe (TCE) was criticized by many of its readers, who later decided to vote "no" to a treaty seen as too neoliberal, lacking social views deemed necessary to the solid foundation of a "European nation".

On 11 December 2010, Libération started hosting a mirror of the WikiLeaks website, including the United States diplomatic cables and other document collections, in solidarity with WikiLeaks, in order to prevent it from being "suffocated" by "governments and companies that were trying to block [WikiLeaks'] functioning without even a judicial decision".

In June 2015, Libération, working with WikiLeaks, reported that the United States National Security Agency had been secretly spying on the telephone conversations of presidents Jacques Chirac, Nicolas Sarkozy and François Hollande from at least 2006 through 2012.

=== Édouard de Rothschild's involvement ===
In 2005 Libération badly needed funds, and Serge July strove to convince the board to allow Édouard de Rothschild to buy a stake in the paper. The board agreed on 20 January 2005. Social conflicts arose shortly after. On 25 November 2005, the paper went on strike, protesting against the layoff of 52 workers. Rothschild, who had promised he would not interfere in editorial decisions, decided that he was not playing an active enough role in the paper's management. In May 2006 the paper announced a weekend magazine called Libé week-end, with a supplement called Ecrans (covering television, internet and film), and another called R. (The latter was abandoned in September of the same year.)

On 13 June 2006, Serge July told the editorial staff that Édouard de Rothschild was refusing to invest more money in the paper unless Louis Dreyfus (directeur général) and himself left the paper. July had accepted, believing the paper's future existence to depend on his decision. The journalists were shocked. The next day, they published a public statement praising the paper's founder and expressing their worries about journalistic independence. Serge July left the paper on 29 June 2006.

A debate between Bernard Lallement, the first administrator-manager of Libération and Edouard de Rothschild took place in Le Monde newspaper. In a column published on 4 July 2006, Lallement argued that July's departure was the end of an era where "writing meant something". Lallement painted a bleak picture of Libération's future, as well as that of the press as a whole. Criticizing Rothschild's interference, Lallement quoted Sartre, who had famously said that "Money doesn't have any ideas". Later, on his blog, Lallement argued that Rothschild, who had had no historic attachment to the paper, was only interested in making money, not in the paper itself. On 6 July, Rothschild declared: "Libération needs help and moral, intellectual and financial support. Libération doesn't need a requiem."

Sixty-two employees—including 35 journalists, such as Antoine de Gaudemar, chief editor, Sorj Chalandon, who was awarded the Albert Londres Prize, both present since the 1973 creation of Libé, and Pierre Haski, deputy editor, present since 1981—were about to resign at end of January 2007 (of a total of 276 employees). With the 55 other employees who left the newspaper at the end of 2005, this made a total of about 150 staff who had left since Rothschild's ownership, not including tens of resignations (including Florence Aubenas, Dominique Simonnot, Antoine de Baecque, Jean Hatzfeld)

In May 2007, former Libération journalists, including Pierre Haski and Pascal Riché (Op-Ed editor of Libération) created the news website Rue 89.

In 2014, the newspaper once again found itself in the news, following a public dispute between its journalists and shareholders over the future of the newspaper. In the face of falling circulation the latter had sought to re-invent the paper's web site as a social network. The editor-in-chief Nicolas Demorand resigned over the row.

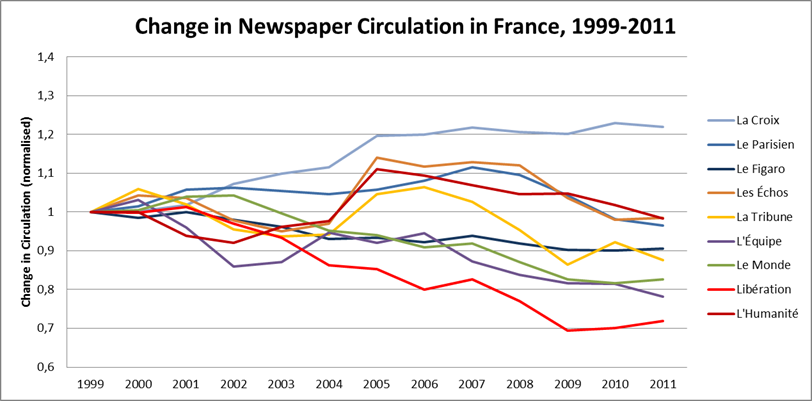

== Circulation statistics ==
Year	France paid circulation
1999	169,427
2000	169,011
2001	174,310
2002	164,286
2003	158,115
2004	146,109
2005	133,270
2006	142,557
2007	132,356
2008	123,317
2009	111,584
2010	113,108
2011	119,205
2012	119,418
2013	101,616
2014	93,781
2015	88,395
2016	73,331
2017	75,275
2018	67,238
2019	71,522
2020	76,522

== See also ==
- Chunichi Shimbun, affiliated newspaper in Japan
- List of French newspapers
