= Pierre Riché =

French historian (1921–2019)

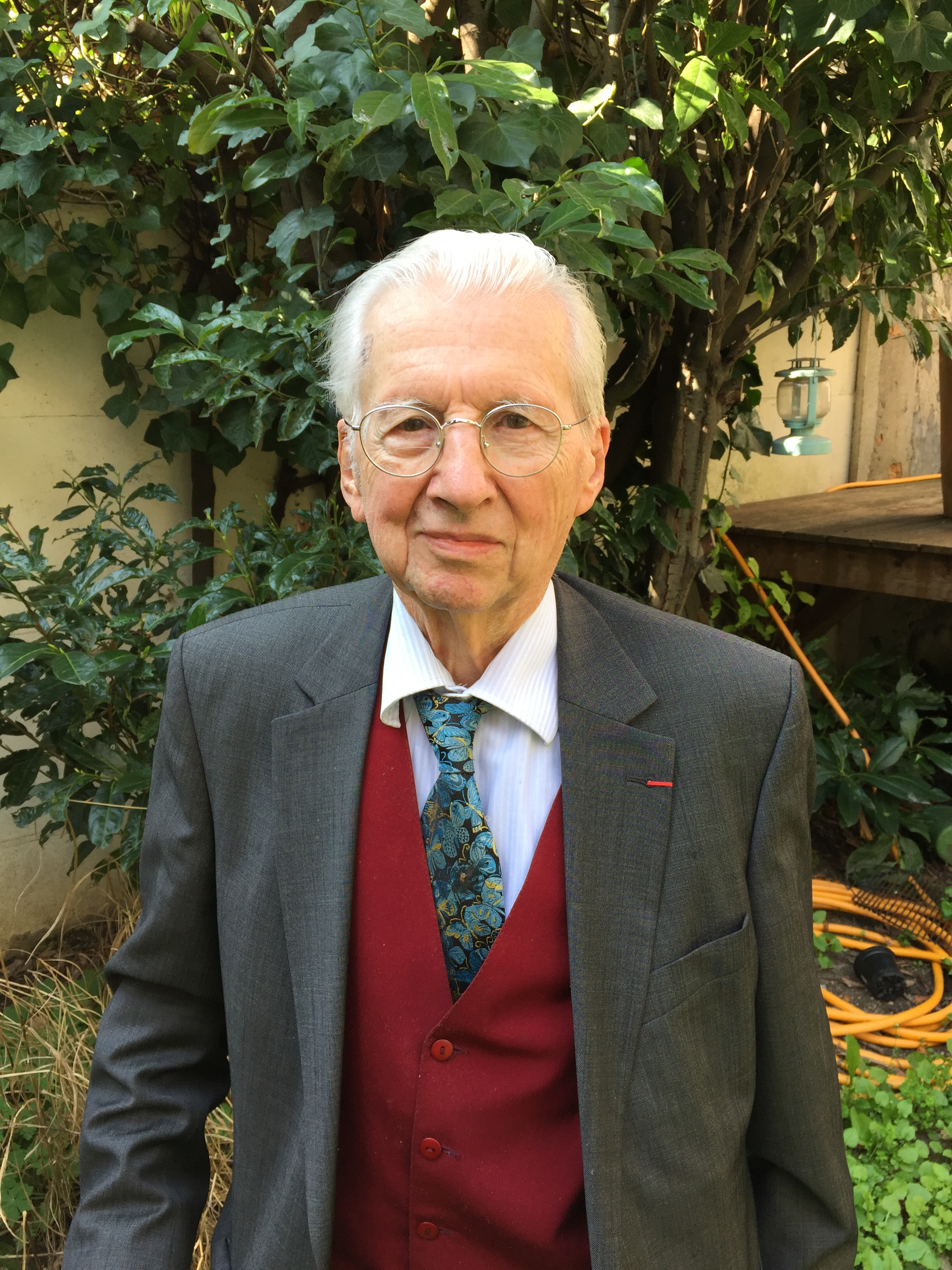
- Riché in 2017
- Born: 4 October 1921; Paris, France
- Died: 6 May 2019 (aged 97)
- Education: Faculté des lettres de Paris
- Occupation: Historian
- Children: Pascal Riché
- Website: pierreriche.free.fr

Pierre Riché (French pronunciation: [pjɛʁ ʁiʃe]; October 4, 1921 – May 6, 2019) was a French historian specializing in the early Middle Ages and the year 1000 (French: An mil or An mille).

== Biography ==
After studying at the Faculté des lettres de Paris, he passed the aggregation of history in 1948, and taught at the high school of Constantine (Algeria) and at Le Mans. In 1953, he was appointed assistant at the Sorbonne.

From 1957 to 1960 Pierre Riché taught as assistant professor in Tunis, before joining the University of Rennes. In 1962, he obtained his doctorate of 3 with a thesis on Education and culture in the barbaric West. He was then appointed professor at the Faculty of letters of Nanterre in October 1967. In 1968, he founded the Center for Research on Late Antiquity and the Early Middle Ages. He retired in 1989.

He is the father of the journalist Pascal Riché.

== Works ==
- La vie des enfants au Moyen Âge, Sorbier, coll. «La vie des enfants…», 2005 (with Danièle Alexandre-Bidon)
- Henri-Irénée Marrou, historien engagé, Cerf, 2003
- Les Invasions barbares, PUF, coll. «Que sais-je ?», 1953; 2003 (with Philippe Le Maître)
- L'Europe de l'an mil, Éditions Zodiaque, 2001
- Écoles et enseignement dans le haut Moyen Âge, Picard, 2000
- Les grandeurs de l'An Mille, éditions Bartillat, 1999
- Dictionnaire des Francs. Les temps mérovingiens, Christian de Bartillat, 1999 (with Patrick Périn)
- Les Carolingiens, Hachette, coll. «Pluriel», 1997
- Éducation et culture dans l'Occident barbare : s-VIe -VIIIe, Seuil, coll. «Points Histoire», 1995 (4th edition)
- Césaire d'Arles, De l'Atelier, 1989
- L'Europe barbare de 476 à 774, SEDES, Paris, 1989
- Gerbert d'Aurillac : Le Pape de l'an mil, Fayard, 1987
- Abbon de Fleury, un moine savant et combatif, Brepols, 2004
- Grandeur et faiblesse de l'Église au Moyen Âge, Cerf, 2006
- Des nains sur des épaules de géants : maître et élèves au Moyen Âge, Tallandier, 2006
- C'était un autre millénaire, souvenir d'un professeur de la communale à Nanterre, Tallandier, 2008
