= Politique internationale =

- Editor: Anne Le Fur
- Categories: Politics
- Frequency: Quarterly
- Founder: Patrick Wajsman
- Founded: 1978
- Country: France
- Based in: Paris
- Language: French
- Website: www.politiqueinternationale.com
- ISSN: 0221-2781

Politique internationale is a quarterly French political affairs magazine covering international relations based in Paris, France.

== History and profile ==
Politique internationale was established by Patrick Wajsman in 1978. The headquarters is in Paris. It has published interviews with leaders both from France and the rest of the world. It organizes eight to ten Breakfast Round Tables a year, bringing together members of the editorial board and a guest of honor. It also publishes Special Reports written in several languages.

The Politique Internationale Prize recognizes a personality from outside France who has demonstrated political courage through his or her actions or writing. The editor-in-chief is Anne Le Fur.
