= Aprilov High School =

Coordinates: 42°52′12″N 25°19′3″E

Aprilov National High School
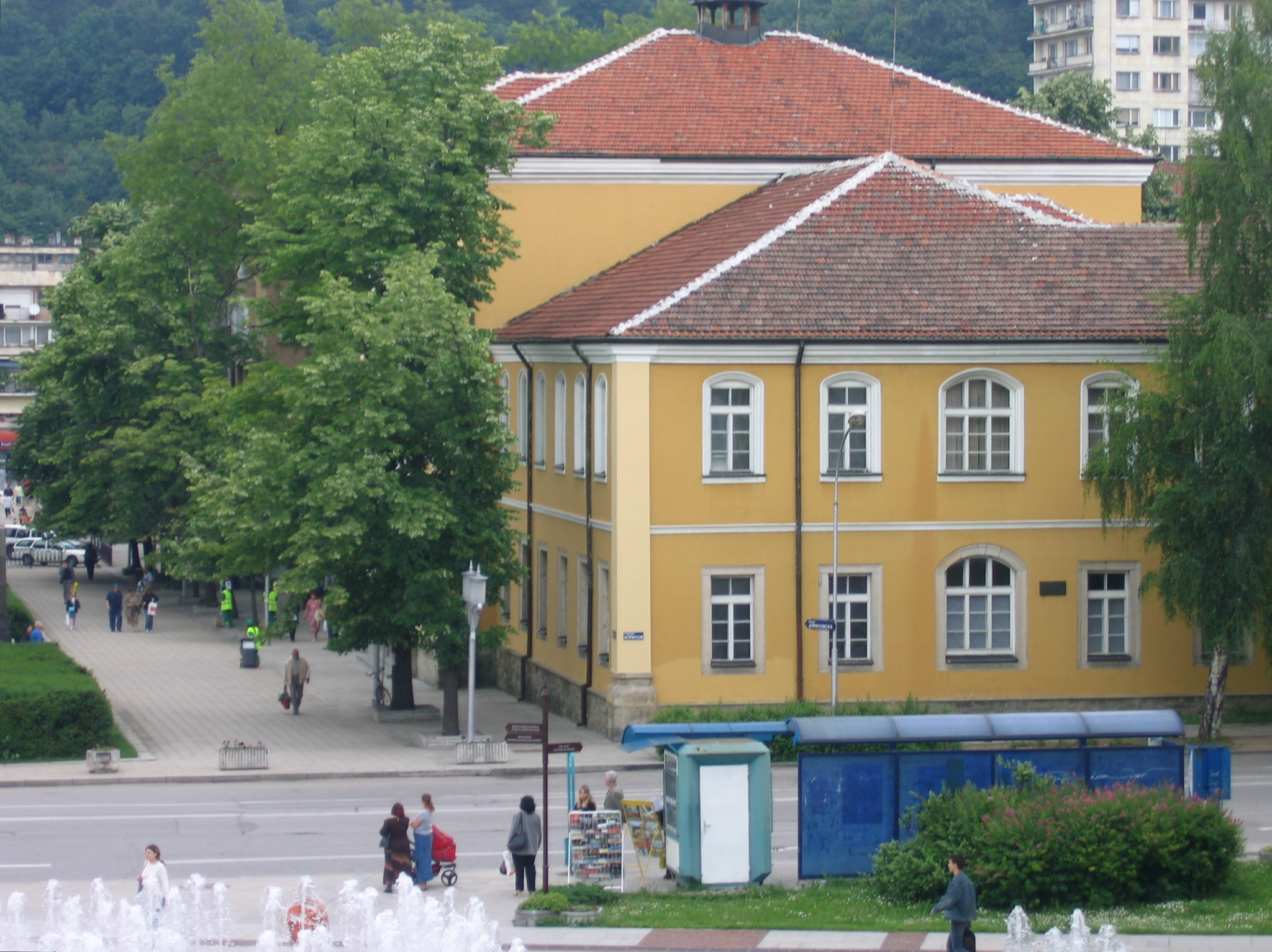
- Aprilov High School
- Aprilovska Str. 15, Gabrovo; Bulgaria

Information
- Type: Public
- Established: 1835; 191 years ago
- Principal: Elvira Hristova
- Grades: 8–12
- Gender: Coeducational
- Website: www.nag-school.org

The Aprilov National High School (Национална Априловска гимназия) in Gabrovo is the first modern secular school in Bulgaria. It was opened on 2 January 1835, when Bulgaria was still part of the Ottoman Empire, with the financial help of Vasil Aprilov, Nikolay Palauzov, Vasil Rasheev and other wealthy Bulgarians and was based on the Bell-Lancaster method.

Formed as the Gabrovo School, it took the name of its primary benefactor, Vasil Aprilov, in 1889. The school still exists today, having returned to its historic building in 1992 and it is one of the most prestigious high schools in Bulgaria.

== History ==
=== Establishment and development ===
The April High School was established during the Bulgarian Renaissance as the first Bulgarian high school. Its origins and development are inextricably linked with the ideas, activities and generosity of the ideologue of modern Bulgarian education Vasil Aprilov. The high school grew on the basis of the Gabrovo Mutual School, opened on the initiative of Aprilov and the Odessa circle of Bulgarians in 1835. The school is the first modern Bulgarian secular school and gave impetus to the opening of similar schools in other cities in the Bulgarian lands. Its graduates are some of the most prominent Revival educators such as Neofit Rilski, Joseph Kovachev, Kalist Lukov, Tsvetan Semerdzhiev, etc. The school was public and free for children from all over the country. With the help and donation of Vasil Aprilov and his closest associate and supporter Nikolay Palauzov, on April 24, 1840, the first public school library was established. In 1857, another prominent Revival activist, a graduate of the school and an Aprilov scholarship holder, Todor Burmov, reformed the curricula and the school moved into the next educational level - a class school. Only 10 years later, in 1867, the teacher Yosif Kovachev introduced the teaching of the "sound method" for the first time.

Meanwhile, the construction of a special school building was in progress. During his visit to Gabrovo in the summer of 1847, Vasil Aprilov opened a subscription list to raise funds for the construction. The building was built in several stages: in 1847–1851, the masonry on the first floor was made by an unknown master; in 1872–1873, the building was completed by Usta Gencho Kanev from Tryavna. It was built in a way that was similar to the building of the Richelieu Lyceum in Odessa. It was located, according to the then framework of the city, on its outskirts, in one of the "most wholesome" and "most hygienic” places. The building was finally completed after the Liberation of Bulgaria in 1880–1881, when its middle part was finished and a number of structural improvements were made. However, on August 26, 1873, the high school moved to a new place and thus became the first school to have its own, specially built building. The class of 1873 was the first complete class to graduate from the school.

The inherited tradition, the good teachers and the material base enabled the school to keep its position as one of the most elite in the country even after the Liberation. On August 12, 1878, the high school was declared state-owned. A little later, on July 20, 1889, on the occasion of the solemn celebration of the 100th anniversary of the birth of Vasil Aprilov, it adopted the name "State Men's Aprilov High School". The school's staff consisted of prominent pedagogues, specialists and public figures such as Trayko Kitanchev, Tsvetan Radoslavov, Evtim Dabev, Ivan Urumov, Stanimir Stanimirov, Sava Sirmanov and others. At the school they expand their pedagogical experience and had the opportunity to implement new educational ideas. Some of them were authors and translators of text- and handbooks. The high school drew students from all over Bulgaria. According to data for the first four school years after the Liberation, it was the largest secondary school in the country. More than 183 of the students came from lands outside of Bulgaria's borders, from Macedonia and Western Thrace to Romania. Among its graduates are some of the leading Bulgarian intellectuals and public figures such as Aleko Konstantinov, Nikola Mihov, Stoyan Romanski, Anastas Ishirkov, Petko Staynov and others. As early as September, 1916, the high school became mixed.

In the years after September 9, 1944, the school retained its leading place in the Bulgarian educational system. It changed its educational profile several times.

=== After 1987 ===
In 1988, the school acquired a new status, becoming a high school with a humanitarian profile, which studies subjects such as literature, history, philosophy and arts. Initially, the program contained elements of classical education such as the study of Old Bulgarian and Latin, the history of culture and the history of philosophy. A few years later, the study of ancient languages dropped out of the program with the aim that the foreign language profile is strengthened.

In 1992, after its transformation into a state school, it received its current name, the National Aprilov High School. At that time the Aprilov High School was housed in the building of the Mathematical High School. In 1996, a decision was made by the Gabrovo Municipal Council to return the school to its historic building in the city center, which for the previous few decades housed the National Museum of Education, founded in 1973. On February 9, 1998, the President Petar Stoyanov together with the mayor Nikolay Dachev inaugurated the renovated historical building of the Aprilov High School. This happened after a 25-year interruption of school activities in this building. From 1992 to 1996 the two institutions were administratively merged under the name National Aprilov High School with a museum of education. This merger has been terminated. The museum is still housed in the west wing of the same building.

On the occasion of the 175th anniversary of its founding in 2010, the school received the badge of honor of the President Georgi Parvanov "for the continuation of the national educational tradition and for remarkable achievements in modern education".

== Education ==
The school is ranked among the most elite secondary schools in Bulgaria. Currently, it enrolls students in 3 language and 2 humanitarian classes. The main foreign languages studied are English and German, and in addition to them, French and Spanish are taught as second languages. The humanitarian profiles are Bulgarian language and literature and history. Many specialized and extracurricular forms of education are also offered.

Over the years, graduates of the school have been winners of national and international student competitions. According to data, 95% of the school's graduates continue their education in universities.

== Traditions ==
=== April Days of Culture ===
Since the early 1990s, the school has been the organizer of the April Days of Culture, which are held annually in the second half of May. The event includes student seminars, theater performances, concerts and literary readings. Traditionally, the days of culture end with the graduation of 12th grade students.

=== Aprilovtsi return ===
The initiative "Aprilovtsi return" is a continuation of the idea that arose on the occasion of the 180th anniversary of the Aprilov High School, to organize an annual Alumni Ball, which will meet the past and present of the high school through informal, festive, creative and working meetings of graduates from different grades of the school. Successful and accomplished students of the Aprilov High School return to tell about their path, the meaning of what they have achieved and the effort they have put into their careers.

== Notable people ==
=== Founder ===
- Vasil Aprilov - economic and educational figure, donor, writer

=== Teachers ===
- Neofit Rilski - monk, teacher, artist, and an important figure of the Bulgarian National Revival
- Grigor Parlichev - writer and translator
- Spiro Gulabchev - politician, publicist and publisher, and one of the first ideologues of anarchism in Bulgaria
- Vasil Karagiosov - manufacturer, politician (MP), honorary vice-consul of Germany in Gabrovo, teacher, prominent public figure and donor

=== Alumni ===
- Anastas Ishirkov - scientist, geographer and ethnographer, professor at Sofia University and academician at the Bulgarian Academy of Sciences
- Ran Bosilek - writer, poet and translator
- Atanas Burov - financier, philanthropist, diplomat and politician from the People's Party, and later the moderate wing of the Democratic Alliance, Minister of Trade, Industry and Labor (1913, 1919–1920) and of Foreign Affairs and Religions (1926–1931)
- Radko Dimitriev - officer, lieutenant general, participant in the Serbo-Bulgarian War, the Balkan War and the Inter-Allied War; Russian officer, infantry general, participated in the Russo-Turkish War and the First World War
- Tsanko Dyustabanov - national revolutionary and participant in the April Uprising of 1876
- Nikola Ivanov - officer (infantry general), chief of staff of the army in 1894–1896 and Minister of war (1896–1899), commander of the Second Bulgarian Army during the Balkan Wars of 1912–1913
- Koljo Karagiosov - economist, shareholder and CEO, honorary consul of Germany in Gabrovo, prominent public figure
- Vasil Radoslavov - politician, MP, leader of the Liberal Party (1887–1918), three-times Prime Minister of Bulgaria
- Tsvetan Radoslavov - psychologist and author of the current national anthem of Bulgaria "Mila Rodino"
- Mihail Savov - officer (lieutenant general), two-times military minister (1891–1894 and 1903–1907), assistant commander in chief during the Balkan Wars
- Stanislav Stanilov - archaeologist, historian and politician
- Racho Stoyanov - writer, playwright and translator
- Teodor Teodorov - politician, leader of the People's Party, Prime Minister of Bulgaria (1918–1919)
- Ivan Fichev - general, Minister of Defence (1914–1915), military historian and academician
- Ivan Hristov - poet, literary critic and musician
