= Aprilov =

Aprilov may refer to

- Aprilov Point on the north coast of Greenwich Island, Antarctica
- Aprilov National High School in Bulgaria
- Aprilov (surname)
