= Luben Mortchev =

Luben Mortchev (Bulgarian: Любен Морчев; born 11 March 1933 in Kingdom of Bulgaria) is a Bulgarian theatre, film and TV director, playwright, and professor at the National Academy for Theatre and Film Arts “Krastyo Sarafov” (NATFA).

Luben Mortchev graduated from the National Academy for Theatre and Film Arts “Krastyo Sarafov” in 1955, in the class of Prof. Boyan Danovski where he studied working with the actor with Prof. Nikolai Massalitinov.

During the five decades of his career, Luben Mortchev worked as a theater director with multiple theatre companies all over the county. He also directed plays for The Bulgarian National Radio and The Bulgarian National Television. Luben Mortchev lent his professional expertise to many amateur drama organizations in support of a wider cultural outreach. In his later years Luben Mortchev continued his creative and professional life in Paris, where he currently resides.

In 1960, Luben Mortchev started his career in education as an assistant professor at the National Academy for Theatre and Film Arts, “Krastyo Sarafov” (NATFA). He continued teaching as a Professor of Film and Television Directing until 1999.

== Films ==
1967, "Dvorat s Lyulkite", TV film

1977, ‘’Momchetata ot Zlaten Lav’’, 4 episodes, Bulgarian National Television.

1984, ‘’Zlatniyat Vek‘’, Bulgarian National Television. “Zlatniyat Vek” (“The Golden Century”) is 11-episode historic drama outlining the reign of King Simeon. In 1984, the series was forbidden by the Bulgarian Communist Party. Since the fall of the communist regime the series has been broadcast more than thirty times.

1991, “Nosht bez teb’’, Bulgarian National Television.

== Television Theatre ==
Luben Mortchev is one of the founders of the TV theater at the Bulgarian National Television. Between 1964 and 1977 he directed 33 televised plays both from Bulgarian and from classical authors such as Molière, Gogol, Marivaux and Hans Christian Andersen. Plays like “Lodka v gorata” by Nikolai Haytov and “Tabakera 18 Karata” by Nikola Rusev have become classics of the national television theatre.

== Stage theatre director ==
After graduating from The National Theatre Academy “Krastyo Sarafov” in 1955, Luben Mortchev started working as a theater director. From 1955 to 1964, he directed “A Curious Mishap” by Carlo Goldoni, “The Cabinet Minister’s Wife” by Branislav Nušić, “Hashove ” by Ivan Vazov, “At the Foot of Vitosha” (Bulgarian: В полите на Витоша) by Peyo Yavorov, “Squaring the Circle” by Valentin Kataev, “Two Angels Descend From Heaven” by Heinar Kipphardt, “Teresa’s Birthday” by Georgh Mdivani, “Two Mapples” (Russian: Два клёна) by Evgeny Schwartz, “Generous evening” (Czech: Příliš štědrý večer) by Vratislav Blazek among many others.

In Sofia, in theatre “Trudov Front” he worked in collaboration with Zelcho Mandadzhiev on the production of the plays “Ot Mnogo Lubov” by Kliment Tsachev, and “Maystori” by Racho Stoyanov. In The National Theatre “Ivan Vazov” he worked with Prof. Philip Philipov on the production of “Twelfth Night “ by Shakespeare, which was a reconstruction of an early performance directed by Nikolai Massalitinov. He directed “Enough Stupidity in Every Wise Man” by Alexander Ostrovsky, ”Predi Buria” by Boyan Balabanov, “Glas Naroden” by Georgi Karaslavov, and “Sluzhbogontsi” by Ivan Vasov.

From 1990 to 1999, Luben Mortchev worked in Paris, in collaboration with Theatre Company Radka Riaskova. Their productions were performed in “Theatre Bouffon” in Paris, and toured in France and Italy. Some of the titles included “The Cherry Orchard” by Anton Chekhov, “Le Médecin malgré lui“ by Molière, “Twelfth Night“ by Shakespeare, “Enough Stupidity in Every Wise Man” by Alexander Ostrovsky, “The Green Bird” by Carlo Gozzi, “The Imaginary Invalid” by Molière and “The Orchestra” by Jean Anouilh.

== Personal life ==
Luben Mortchev is married. His wife Afrodita Mortcheva is a professor of French Language at Sofia University “St. Kliment Ohridski”. She is also a prolific translator, author of a French Bulgarian dictionary, as well as the creator of a successful French Language Education Method “Le français c’est super!”. Together they have two children.
