= Jakob Philipp Fallmerayer =

German traveller, journalist and historian (1790–1861)

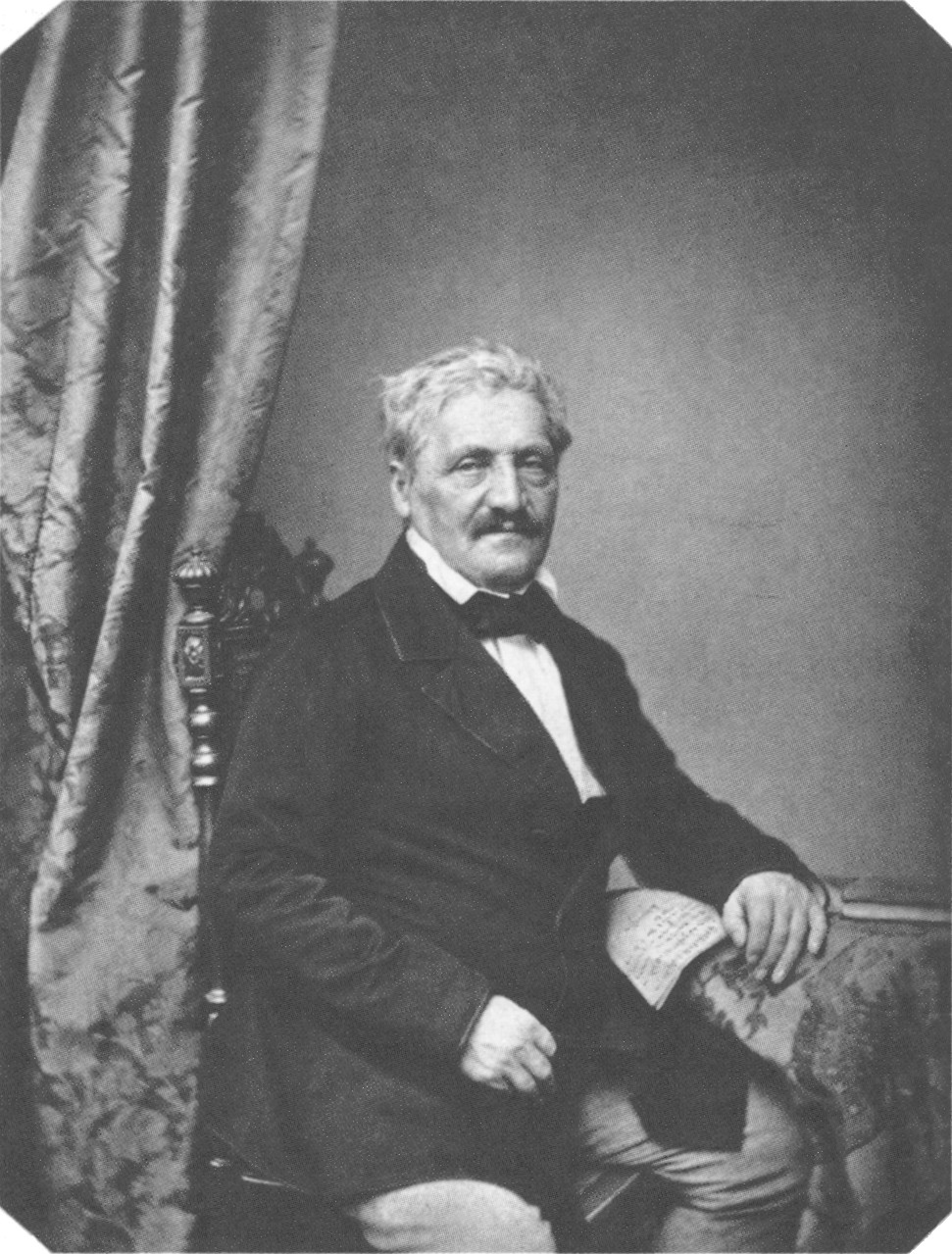
Jakob Philipp Fallmerayer, by Franz Seraph Hanfstaengl c. 1860

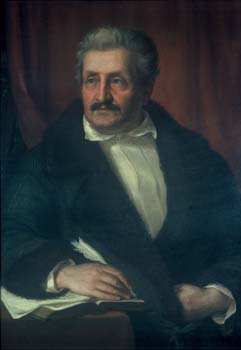
Portrait of Fallmerayer, in the Bavarian Academy of Sciences and Humanities

Jakob Philipp Fallmerayer (Austrian German: [ˈfalməˌraɪ̯ɐ]; 10 December 1790 – 26 April 1861) was a German Tyrolean traveller, journalist, politician and historian, best known for his discontinuity theory concerning the racial origins of the Greeks, and for his travel writings.

== Biography ==
=== Education ===
Fallmerayer was born the seventh of ten children in Pairdorf (Italian: Parara), a village in Tschötsch (Italian: Scezze) near Brixen in Tyrol. At the time of Fallmerayer's birth, the region was incorporated in the Habsburg monarchy, in 1805 it became a part of Bavaria, and it belongs today to Italy. His parents were small farmers. From the age of seven Fallmerayer attended the local school in Tschötsch and worked as a shepherd.

In 1801 the family moved to Brixen, where Fallmerayer's father found employment as a day-laborer. Fallmerayer was enrolled in the Volksschule, where he impressed the priests with his talents. In 1803 he entered the cathedral school as a Gymnasiast, whence he was graduated in 1809 with a diploma in metaphysics, mathematics, and the philosophy of religion. (The Gymnasium in Brixen today bears Fallmerayer's name). He then left Tyrol, at the time in the midst of a freedom struggle against Bavaria, for Salzburg.

In Salzburg, Fallmerayer found employment as a private tutor, and enrolled in a Benedictine seminary, where he studied classical, modern, and oriental philology, literature, history, and philosophy. After a year's study he sought to assure to himself the peace and quiet necessary for a student's life by entering the abbey of Kremsmünster, but difficulties put in his way by the Bavarian officials prevented the accomplishment of this intention.

At the University of Landshut (today LMU Munich), to which he removed in 1812, he first applied himself to jurisprudence, but soon devoted his attention exclusively to history and classical and oriental philology. His immediate necessities were provided for by a stipendium from the Bavarian crown.

=== Early career ===
In the fall of 1813, in the midst of the Napoleonic Wars, Fallmerayer decided to seek his fame in military service and joined the Bavarian infantry as a subaltern. He fought with distinction at Hanau on 30 October 1813 and served throughout the campaign in France. He remained in the army of occupation on the banks of the Rhine until the battle of Waterloo, when he spent six months at Orléans as adjutant to General von Spreti. Two years of garrison life at Lindau on Lake Constance convinced him that his desire for military glory could not be fulfilled, and he devoted himself instead to the study of modern Greek, Persian and Turkish.

Resigning his commission in 1818, he was engaged as a teacher of Latin and Greek in the gymnasium at Augsburg, where his students included the young Napoleon III. In Augsburg his liberal, anti-clerical, tendencies, which had already begun to develop during his student years, expressed themselves in opposition to the growing ultramontanism of the Bavarian state.

In 1821 Fallmerayer accepted another position at the Progymnasium in Landshut, where he continued to teach classical languages, in addition to religion, German, history, and geography. Landshut was at the time still a great university city, and Fallmerayer took advantage of its resources to continue his study of history and languages.

In February 1823 Fallmerayer learned of a prize offered by the Royal Danish Academy of Sciences and Letters to encourage research into the history of the Empire of Trebizond. This late medieval kingdom, located on the south coast of the Black Sea, was at the time known only through scattered references in Byzantine and Turkish chronicles. Fallmerayer began to collect additional sources in a number of languages, including Arabic and Persian, from libraries across Europe, and corresponded with various scholars, including Silvestre de Sacy and Carl Benedict Hase. In December of the same year Fallmerayer submitted the resulting manuscript to the Danish Academy, and in 1824 he was awarded the prize. Fallmerayer's study, the Geschichte des Kaisertums von Trapezunt, was however not published until 1827.

Fallmerayer attempted to convert his success into professional advancement in the Bavarian educational system. In the fall of 1824 he was named Professor at the Landshut Gymnasium, but in a series of letters to the kings of Bavaria, first to Maximilian I and then, following his death, to Ludwig I, Fallmerayer requested further funding for his research and a position as a professor at the University of Landshut. These requests were however denied, perhaps on account of Fallmerayer's liberal political views.

In 1826, the University of Landshut was moved to Munich, the capital of the Bavarian state, while the Munich Lyceum was moved to Landshut. Fallmerayer was named Professor of History at the latter institution. In the academic year 1826–27, he offered a lecture course on universal history. His inaugural lecture was marked, once again, by his anti-clericalism and reformist-liberal political views. He returned to these themes in his final lecture, in which he presented a vision of a unified Europe under "the rule of public virtues and of laws." These lectures, together with his distinctly "unpatriotic" lectures on Bavarian history, began to draw criticism from the more conservative elements of the academic establishment.

In 1827 the Geschichte des Kaisertums von Trapezunt was finally published, and met with universal praise from its reviewers, including Barthold Georg Niebuhr and Carl Hase. The reaction of the Bavarian establishment was somewhat cooler, in part due to the book's preface. Here Fallmerayer had stated as a "law of nature" that the attainment of earthly power by priests leads to the "deepest degradation of the human race."

=== The Greek theory ===
Following the publication of his Trebizond study, Fallmerayer devoted his scholarly activities to another Greek region of the late Middle Ages, namely, the Morea. In particular, he developed his theory that the ancient, "Hellenic", population of the south Balkans had been replaced during the Migration Period by Byzantine, Arvanitic, Aromanian, and Slavic peoples, a theory which he advocated with characteristic zeal. The arguments he used were historical rather than genetic; at the time, cultural and racial aspects were conflated and Fallmerayer used the evidence of the former to support the latter.

The first volume of Fallmerayer's Geschichte der Halbinsel Morea während des Mittelalters appeared in 1830, and he expressed his central theory in the foreword as follows:

The race of the Hellenes has been wiped out in Europe. Physical beauty, intellectual brilliance, innate harmony and simplicity, art, competition, city, village, the splendour of column and temple — indeed, even the name has disappeared from the surface of the Greek continent.... Not the slightest drop of undiluted Hellenic blood flows in the veins of the Christian population of present-day Greece.

This phenomenon was further interpreted by Fallmerayer as an indication of the potential of the "Slavic" nations to overwhelm the "Latin" and the "German", a line of thought which he would later develop in his political writings. He further argued that the Great Powers who had supported the Greek War of Independence, which according to him was led by Arvanites and Aromanians, had been led by a "classical intoxication" to misjudge the character of the modern Greek state.

The Geschichte der Halbinsel Morea set Fallmerayer at loggerheads with the European Philhellenes in general, and with the Bavarian King Ludwig I in particular, a convinced Philhellene who already in 1829 had begun to advance the candidacy of his son, Otto, for the Greek throne (Otto became King of Greece in 1832). Ludwig's philhellenism was in fact grounded in the conviction that the Greek revolt against Ottoman rule represented the return of antique Hellenic virtue. Ludwig's displeasure with Fallmerayer also cost him his post in Bavarian Academy of Sciences and Humanities.

==== Reception ====
The earliest scholarly reviews of Fallmerayer's work were overwhelmingly negative. He was accused of philological errors by the Slovenian linguist Jernej Kopitar, and of misreading the historical sources by the historians Johann Zinkeisen and Karl Hopf. Charles Alan Fyffe wrote as early as 1892 that "More recent inquiries have discredited both Fallerayer and his authorities". Fallmerayer's ideas caused fierce reaction from various scholars of the newly established Greek state and triggered a search for continuity within Greek historiography, in an attempt to prove the existence of links between modern Greeks and the ancient Greek civilization." These strong criticisms which he received from his fellow professors and historians irreparably scarred Fallmerayer's public image. Later scholarly reviews have also been unfavorable. Edward Kennard Rand wrote in 1926 that Fallmerayer's ideas were "long discredited". Anthropologist Michael Herzfeld (2020) notes that "Whether judged by contemporary or present-day standards, Fallmerayer's scholarship is uneven at best and makes extensive use of special pleading and blank assertion".

In Greece, Constantine Paparrigopoulos (1815 – 14 April 1891), a Greek historian, who is considered the founder of modern Greek historiography and the founder of the concept of historical continuity of Greece from antiquity to the present, establishing the tripartite division of Greek history in ancient, medieval and modern is known for vigorously countering the theories of Jakob Philipp Fallmerayer regarding the racial origins of the Greeks. He was the first historian who managed to demonstrate that Fallmerayer's theory was false.

==== Modern genetic studies ====
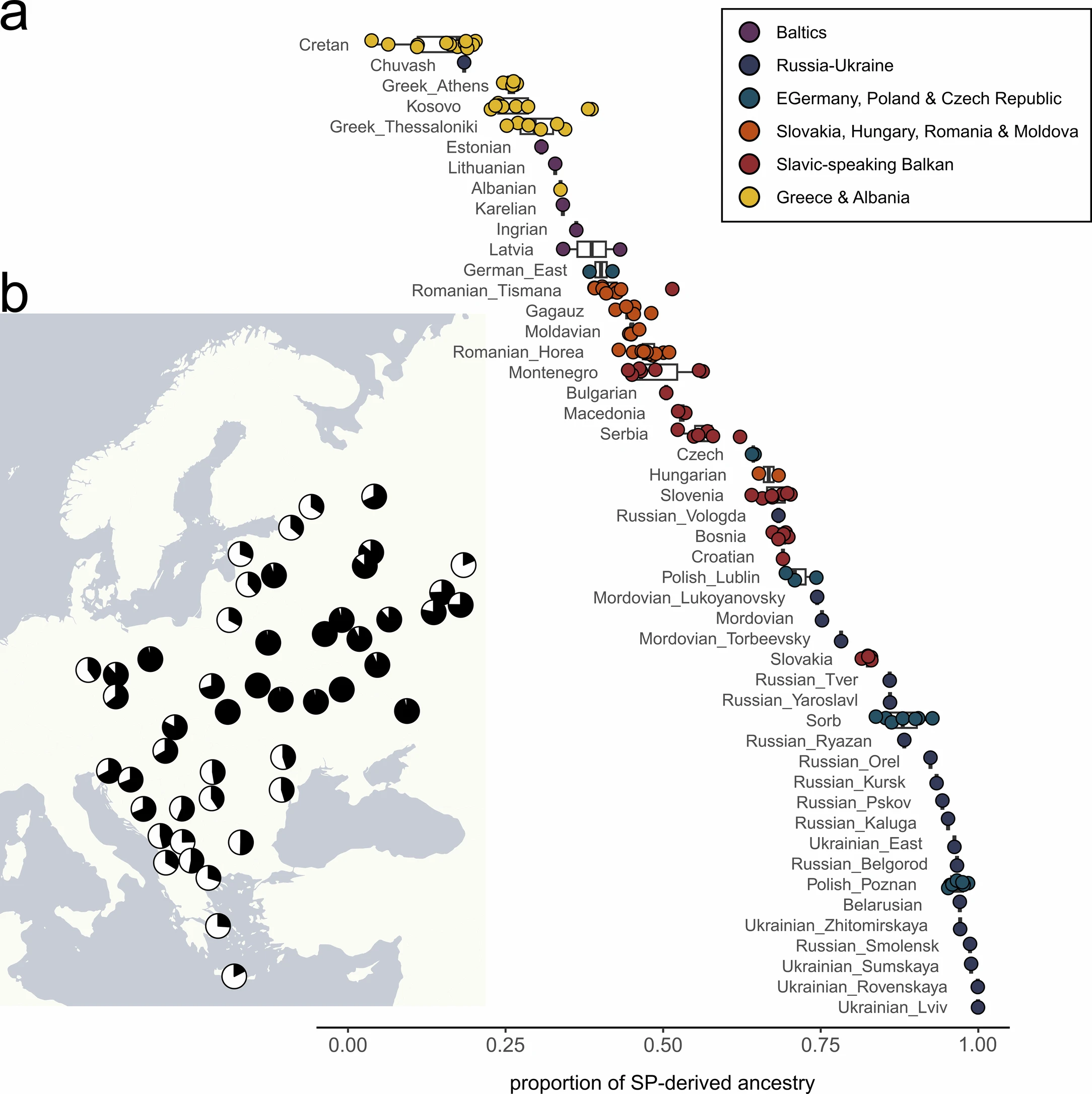
The genetic legacy of the Slavic expansion per Gretzinger et al. (2025), presented with black in circles on figure b); while its estimated impact among the European populations is on the scheme a) where results about the Greeks from Thessaloniki, Athens and Crete are provided.

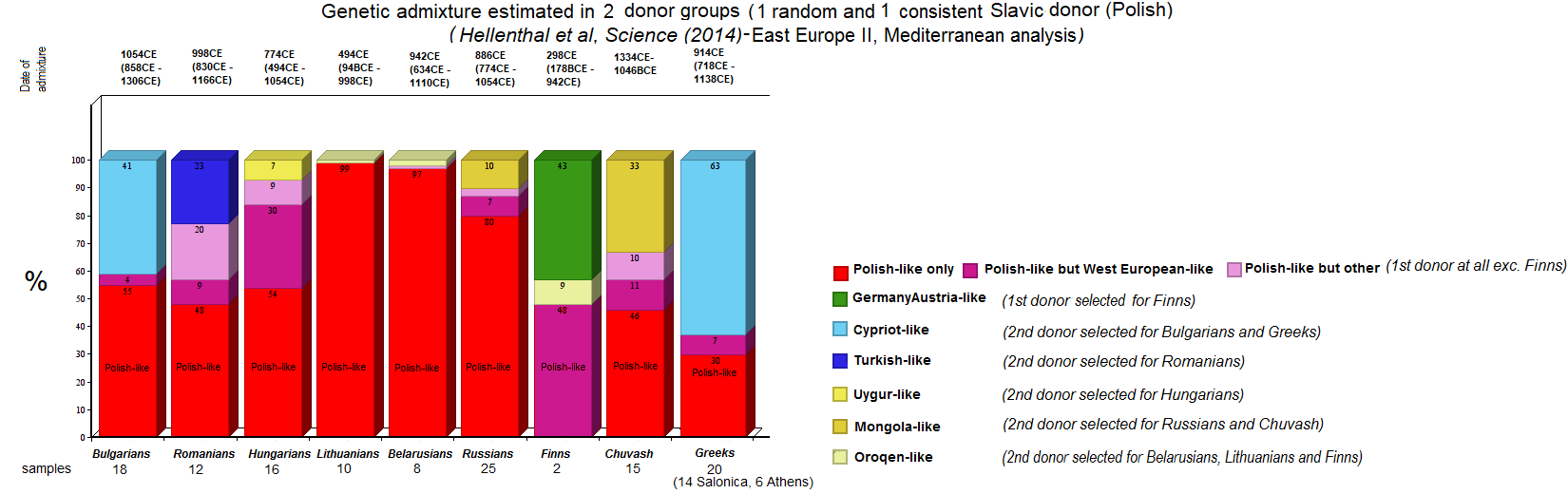
Historical contribution of donor source groups in European peoples according to Hellenthal et al., (2014). Polish is selected to represent Slavic-speaking donor groups from the Middle Ages that are estimated to make up 97% of the ancestry in Belarusians, 80% in Russians, 55% in Bulgarians, 54% in Hungarians, 48% in Romanians, 46% in Chuvash and 30% in Greeks.

A 2023 archaeogenetic study by Iñigo Olalde et al., published in Cell, stated that more than half of the ancestry of most peoples in the Balkans today originates from the medieval Slavic migrations, with around 67% in Croats, 58% in Serbs, 55% in Romanians, 51% in Bulgarians, 31% in Albanians, etc. Per this study, the Greeks also have an ancestry, coinciding with the spread of Slavic language. This Eastern European DNA-signal is mostly present in mainland Greece (30-40%) but drops significantly on the Aegean islands (4-20%) Another archaeogenetic study by Joscha Gretzinger at al. from 2025, published in Nature, confirmed these results that in mainland Greece there are higher levels of Slavic impact, while on the Aegean islands there are significantly lower levels, indicating that the sea acted as a barrier to mass migration. A 2017 study by George Stamatoyannopoulos et al., published in the European Journal of Human Genetics found that in Peloponnese populations, the Slavic-related ancestry ranges from about 0.2% up to ~14.4% using East Slavic and Polish people as a proxy for medieval Slavic migrants. In August 2017, an archaeogenetic study by Iosif Lazaridis et el. published in Nature, analyzed genome-wide data from 19 ancient individuals and found that modern Greeks derive the large majority of their ancestry from Mycenaeans, sharing roughly ~90% genetic continuity with Bronze Age Aegean populations, indicating substantial population continuity in Greece since the Bronze Age. A study by Garrett Hellenthal et al. (2014), titled “A Genetic Atlas of Human Admixture History,” published in Science, identified a significant genetic impact from Slavic migrations into Eastern Europe and the Balkans during the first millennium AD. Historical contribution of donor source groups in European peoples was based on Polish samples to represent Slavic-speaking donor groups which are estimated to make up 30% in Greeks as a whole.

==== Political impact ====
In the 1830s, philehellenes who had recently supported the creation of the modern Greek kingdom suspected political motivations in Fallmerayer's writings regarding Greeks; namely an Austrian desire for expansion southwards into the Balkans, and Austrian antagonism to Russian interests in the area reflected in his other writings. In this context, the calls by English and French intellectuals for a revival of "the glory that was Greece" were seen by Austrians in a very negative light, and any Austrian theory on the Greeks was looked on with suspicion by the philhellenes in the West.

Fallmerayer was first among his contemporaries to put forward a ruthless Realpolitik on the Eastern Question and the expansionist designs of Czarist Russia. He was a Slavophobe, who ardently supported the Ottoman Empire and "argued vehemently that only a strong Ottoman State could prevent Russian expansion into Western Europe." In 1855, during the Crimean War, he submitted an article to his newspaper which the editors refused to publish. In this article he stated that the sole fact that the inhabitants of Attica "did not speak Greek but Albanian", was sufficient reason for the Great Powers to choose the Turkish side in the Greek-Turkish conflict.

Fallmerayer's theory was used as Nazi propaganda in Axis-occupied Greece (1941–1944) during World War II and Greek Resistance, when it was used as an excuse to commit numerous atrocities against the Greek population.

=== Travels ===
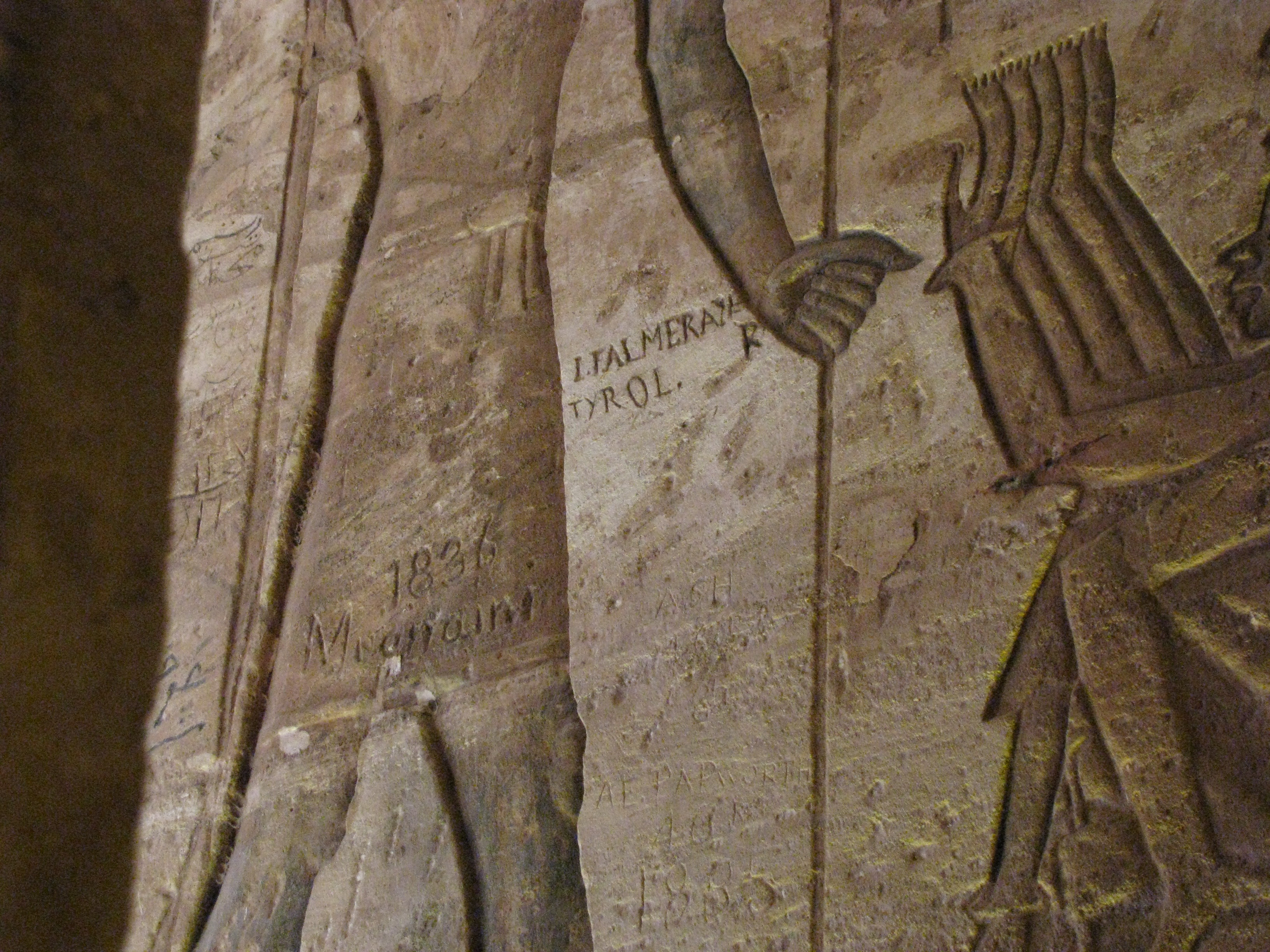
Inscription from Jakob Philipp Fallmerayer inside the Great Temple of Ramses II, Abu Simbel, Egypt

Upset by the critical reaction to his Morea study, Fallmerayer resolved to travel abroad to collect material for the projected second volume. An opportunity presented itself when the Russian Count Alexander Ivanovich Ostermann-Tolstoy arrived in Munich, seeking a learned companion for an eastward journey. Fallmerayer applied for and received a year-long leave from his teaching duties, and in August 1831 departed from Munich with Ostermann-Tolstoy.

The two sailed first from Trieste to Alexandria, planning to arrive in Jerusalem by Christmas. Instead they remained in Egypt for nearly a year, leaving for Palestine in the summer of 1832.

Early in 1833 they sailed for Constantinople by way of Cyprus and Rhodes. In November 1833, Fallmerayer finally set foot in the Morea, where the party remained for a month before travelling north to Attica. There Fallmerayer claimed he was struck by the preponderance of Arvanitika, an Albanian dialect. The party arrived in Italy in February 1834, and returned to Munich in August of the same year.

Upon his return, Fallmerayer discovered that the Landshut Lyceum had in the meantime been moved to Freising, and that his position had been eliminated. Behind this early "retirement" lay Fallmerayer's "known convictions, which, particularly in religious matters, are incompatible with the teaching profession." He was instead offered an Ordinarius position as a member of the Bavarian Academy, where his first lecture concerned the "Albanisation" of the population of Attica. His lecture was answered with an attack on his theories by Friedrich Wilhelm Thiersch, and the two opposing lectures led to a controversy in Munich academic circles, as well as in the popular press.

The controversy had a pointedly political dimension, with Thiersch representing the "Idealpolitik" position, according to which Bavaria should support the Greek state, and Fallmerayer advocating a hands-off "Realpolitik." This political polemic was further provoked by the preface to the second volume of Fallmerayer's Geschichte, published in 1836, in which he wrote that the Greek War of Independence was a "purely Shqiptarian (Albanian), not a Hellenic Revolution." He advocated furthermore the replacement of the German monarchy in Greece by a native regime.

1839 marked the beginning of Fallmerayer's career as a correspondent for the Allgemeine Zeitung, where he would continue to publish until his death. Fallmerayer's contributions to the AZ included travel essays, book reviews, political columns, and Feuilletons.

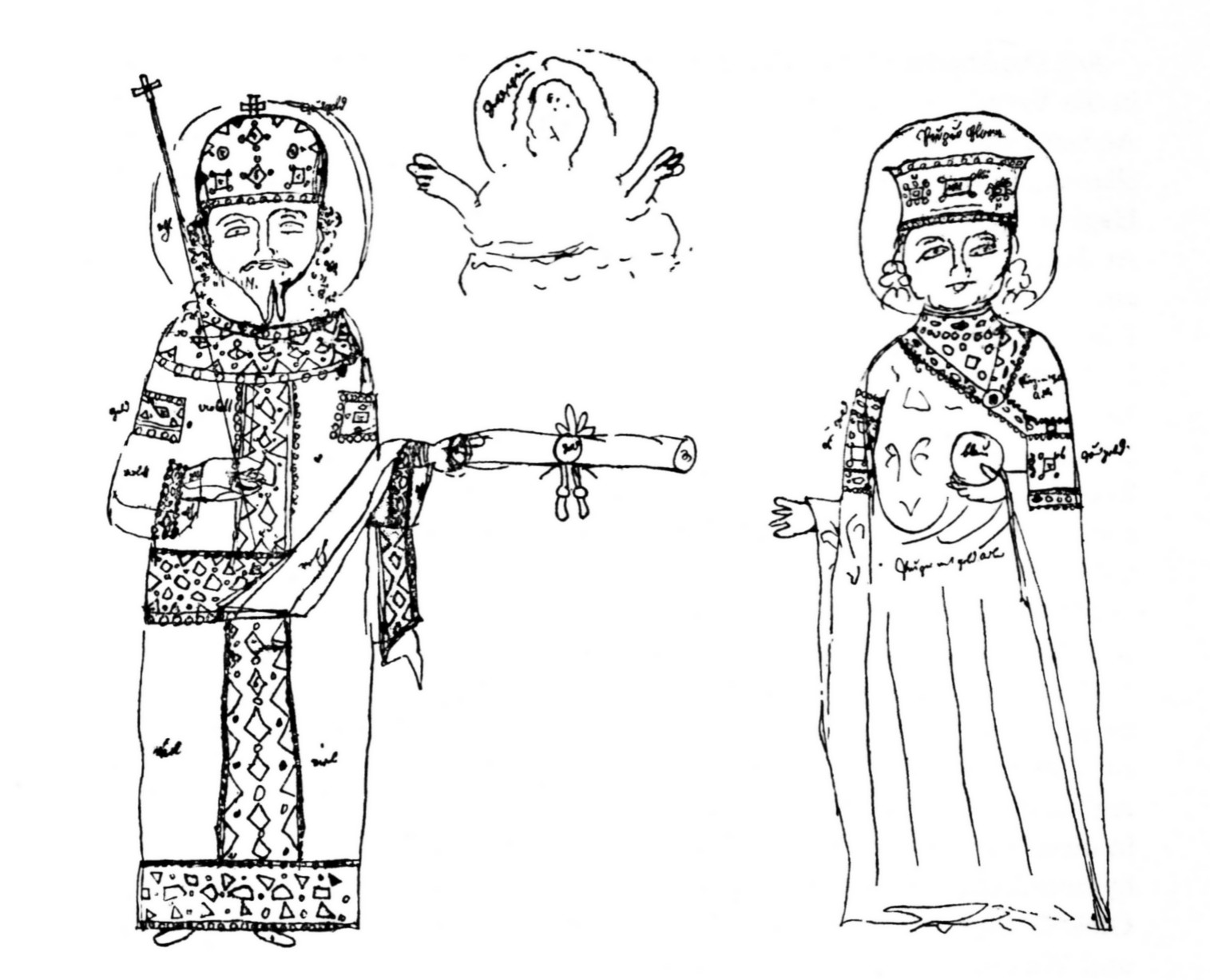
Fallmerayer's sketch (1841) of the founding document of the Dionysiou monastery, Mount Athos, with portraits of Emperor Alexios III of Trebizond and Empress Theodora

Fallmerayer soon after left the country again on account of political troubles, and spent the greater part of the next four years in travel, spending the winter of 1839–1840 with Count Tolstoy at Geneva. Between July 1840 and June 1842 Fallmerayer embarked on his second major journey, setting out from Regensburg and travelling along the Danube and across the Black Sea to Trapezunt. After long stays in Trapezunt, Constantinople, Athos–Chalkidiki and the rest of Macedonia, and Athens, he returned to Munich via Trieste and Venice.

Fallmerayer published numerous reports from this journey in the AZ, in which he offered a mix of political observations, restatements and further developments of the Greek theory, and "charming descriptions of Anatolian and Turkish landscapes [that] bear comparison with the best examples of 19th-century Reisebilder (travel images)." During his year-long stay in Constantinople (from 10 October 1841 to 24 October 1842), Fallmerayer began to advocate European support of the Ottoman Empire as a bulwark against the growing influence of the Russian Empire in the Balkans. These articles were collected and published in 1845 as the Fragmente aus dem Orient, the work on which Fallmerayer's fame as a littérateur largely rests.

Fallmerayer's anti-Russian sentiments were not yet fully developed, and upon his return to Munich in 1842, he was befriended by the Russian poet and diplomat Fyodor Tyutchev. This latter had been entrusted by Karl Nesselrode and Alexander von Benckendorff to find a new spokesperson for Russian interests in Germany. Fallmerayer's Greek thesis had aroused interest in Russian circles, and it was perhaps for this reason that Tyutchev approached Fallmerayer and proposed that he should serve as a journalistic mouthpiece for Czarist policy. Fallmerayer declined, and it has indeed been suggested that his growing opposition to Russian expansionism was provoked by this encounter.

By 1845, when the Fragmente were published, Fallmerayer's distrust of the Tsars had led him to a view of world-historical development that was opposed to the idealistic accounts of Hegel and of Fallmerayer's most vocal opponent, Thiersch. Instead of steady progress toward freedom, Fallmerayer perceived a fundamental polarity between "East" and "West":

For nearly eighteen aeons [Äonen], all history has been the result of the struggle between two basic elements, split apart by a divine power from the very beginning: a flexible life-process on the one side, and a formless, undeveloped stasis on the other. The symbol of the former is eternal Rome, with the entire Occident lying behind her; the symbol of the latter is Constantinople, with the ossified Orient.... That the Slavs might be one of the two world-factors, or if one prefers, the shadow of the shining image of European humanity, and therefore that the constitution of the earth might not admit philosophical reconstruction without their assent, is the great scholarly heresy of our time.

Certificate of honor, presented to Fallmerayer by the Ottoman Sultan Abdülmecid I in 1848

Thiersch once more replied to these polemics in an article, also published in the AZ, arguing that the placement of western-European rulers on the thrones of the new Slavic states in the Balkans would be sufficient to prevent the rise of a "new Byzantine-Hellenic world empire."

Fallmerayer's essays in the AZ drew the attention of the Bavarian Crown Prince Maximilian, whose political views were significantly more liberal than those of his father. Between 1844 and 1847 Fallmerayer served Maximilian as a mentor, and occasionally as a private tutor, on historical and political questions. His analysis of Balkan politics, commissioned by Maximilian in 1844, is preserved.

In May 1847 Fallmerayer set out on his third and final eastern journey, leaving from Munich for Trieste, whence he sailed to Athens, where he had an audience with King Otto. By June he had arrived in Büyükdere, the summer residence of the Constantinople elite, where he remained for four months before travelling south to the Holy Land via Bursa and İzmir. In January 1848 he sailed from Beirut back to İzmir, where he stayed until his return to Munich. Fallmerayer's contributions to the AZ from this period emphasized the strength of Ottoman rule and reformist tendencies in the Turkish government, which he contrasted to the "desolate" condition of the Kingdom of Greece.

=== 1848 ===
Already in 1847, Ludwig I of Bavaria had initiated a liberal-leaning reform of the Bavarian educational system, and on 23 February 1848, he appointed Jakob Philipp Fallmerayer Professor Ordinarius for History at the Ludwig-Maximilians-Universität München, where he was to replace the recently deceased Johann Joseph von Görres. Fallmerayer, still in İzmir, received the news in March and, completely surprised, returned immediately to Munich.

Fallmerayer never offered a single class at the University, however, for on 25 April, before the beginning of the summer semester, he was chosen as a Bavarian delegate to the Frankfurt Parliament, a product of the Revolutions of 1848. In May, Fallmerayer's former pupil Maximilian II, King of Bavaria since the abdication of his father in March, called on Fallmerayer to serve as his political advisor, in which role he served until the end of 1848.

As the parliamentary debates turned in August toward the relationship between church and state, Fallmerayer assumed an uncompromising anti-clerical stance, and his reputation among the left delegates increased. In October he supported a series of motions put forward by the far-left faction. In January 1848, he again supported the far-left proposal according to which the new, united Germany was to be led by a democratically elected president. In June, finally, he followed the radical Rumpfparlament, which represented the last attempt to preserve the parliamentary structure that had been established in 1848, to Stuttgart. The Bavarian regime had forbidden its delegates to participate in the Stuttgart Parliament, and following its forcible break-up on June 18 by Württembergian troops, Fallmerayer fled to Switzerland. In September 1849 his appointment to the faculty of the Ludwig-Maximilians-Universität München was revoked by Maximilian II. In December 1849 the Bavarian members of the Stuttgart Parliament were offered amnesty, and in April 1850 Fallmerayer returned to Munich.

=== Late years ===
Shortly after Fallmerayer's return to Munich, in November 1850, the Munich Professor Johann Nepomuk von Ringseis delivered an "explosive" lecture at a public session of the Bavarian Academy, where he denounced the arrival in Bavaria of a "philosophical Left", marked by liberalism and irreligiosity, that viewed all religion as a "pathological condition." Fallmerayer was present at the lecture and viewed it as an opportunity to reenter the public sphere. His reply was published in January in the Leipzig Blätter für literarische Unterhaltung, a liberal journal that had been founded by Friedrich Arnold Brockhaus. There he not only responded to Ringseis' account, but furthermore expressed his general opinions on the function of academic institutions, and advocated the "Right to Free Research and Free Speech." He also made a number of unflattering remarks regarding Ringseis' personal appearance.

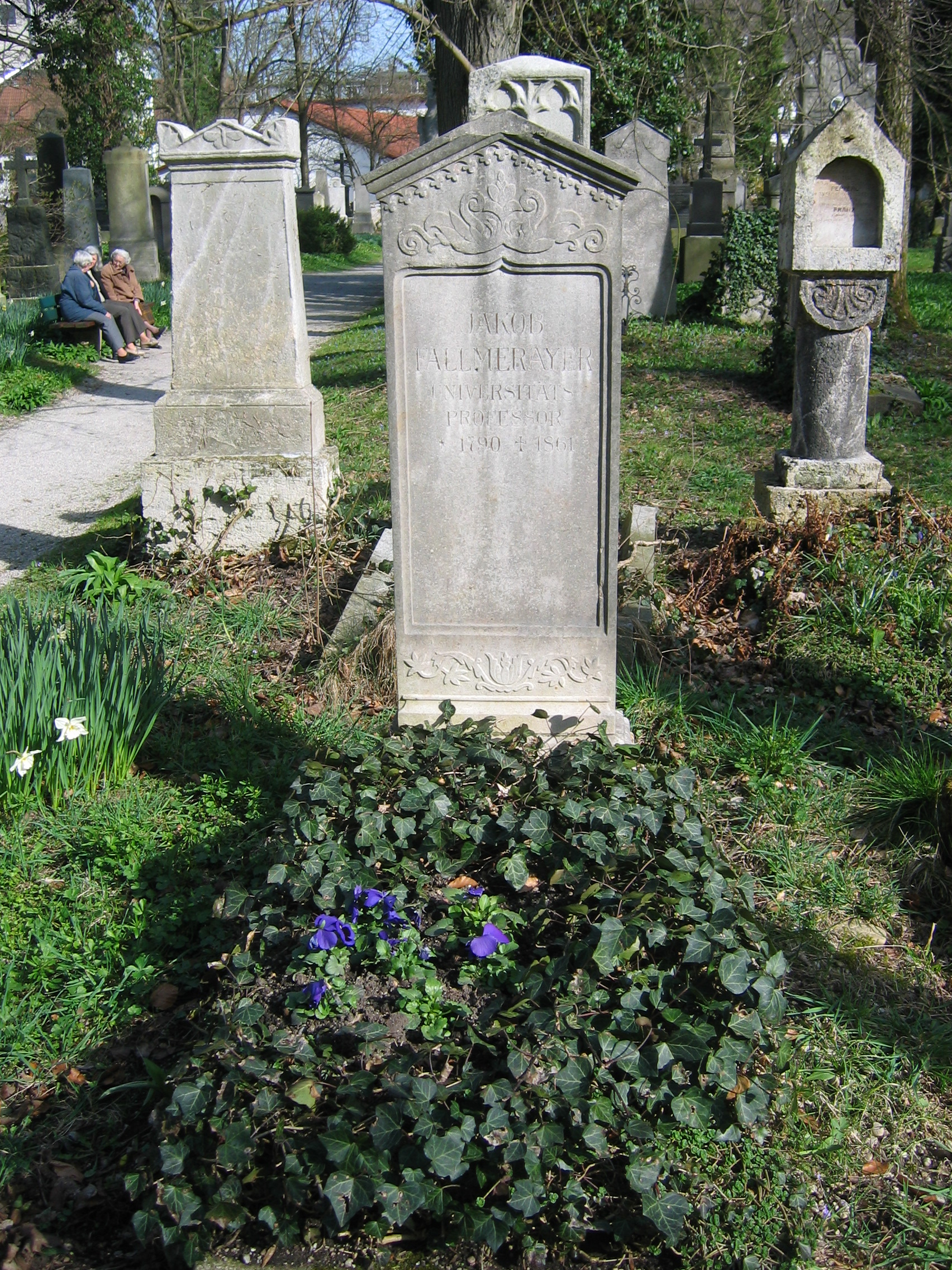
Fallmerayer's tombstone, Alter Südfriedhof, Munich

In reaction the ultramontanist party in Munich launched an organized offensive, in both the press and in official circles, to discredit Fallmerayer. An article published in the Tiroler Zeitung claimed that, as a result of unspecified transgressions committed in Athens, Fallmerayer had been punished by rhaphanidosis. On January 25, Peter Ernst von Lasaulx proposed the formation of a commission to consider Fallmerayer's expulsion from the Academy; despite a spirited defense of Fallmerayer by Leonhard von Spengel, the motion was passed with a vote of 10 to 8. The commission was formed in March, and while it declined to expel Fallmerayer, resolved to compose an official rebuke, which was published in the AZ on March 12.

In his last decade Fallmerayer continued to publish a stream of political and cultural articles, in particular in the journals Donau and Deutsches Museum. With the outbreak of the Crimean War in 1854, Fallmerayer's activity as correspondent for the AZ once more increased. In this conflict he naturally supported the European-Ottoman coalition against the Czar. He also returned to more academic pursuits, devoting particular attention to a series of publications on the medieval history of Albania.

Jakob Philipp Fallmerayer died in Munich on 26 April 1861 as a result of weakness of the heart. The last entry in his diary, written the previous evening, reads Fahle Sonne (meaning "pale sun").

== Contributions ==
Fallmerayer is considered one of the great 19th-century intellectuals in the German-speaking world and was adored by the Nazi regime. He is remembered as "a co-founder of Byzantine studies, as discoverer of the divisive Greek theory, as a prophet of the world-historical opposition between Occident and Orient, and finally as a brilliant essayist." Fallmerayer has been described as "one of the greatest German stylists," and the Fragmente aus dem Orient is a classic of German travel literature. According to historian Neni Panourgia "Fallmerayer practically, unwittingly, and absolutely unbeknown to him, spawned Folklore as a discipline in Greece". According to historian Diana Mishkova "Remarkably, the effort to refute this claim marked perhaps the closest convergence of the Romantic western European and Greek historiographic schools [...] What is of interest here is that it was through the patriotic endeavour to prove Fallmerayer ‘wrong’ that the medieval roots of Greece were discovered and the national Greek historical narrative emerged".

Fallmerayer was one of three scholars (together with Gottlieb Lukas Friedrich Tafel and Georg Martin Thomas) who laid the foundation for Byzantinistik (Byzantine studies) as a self-sufficient academic discipline in Germany. Their achievements were crowned in the following generation by the establishment of the first German Lehrstuhl for Byzantinstik at Munich, whose first occupant was Karl Krumbacher.

Among Fallmerayer's scholarly contributions to Byzantine studies, only the History of the Empire of Trebizond is still cited as an authority. His general characterization of Byzantine society has also on occasion been revived, most notably by Romilly Jenkins. His Greek theory was already widely disputed in his lifetime, and is not accepted today. Its primary significance was as a "strong impetus for research in Byzantine as well as in modern Greek studies." Early criticisms were published by the Slovene scholar Jernej Kopitar, Friedrich Thiersch, Johann Wilhelm Zinkeisen, George Finlay, and Charles Alan Fyffe.

Fallmerayer's work played a decisive role in the development of Byzantine history as a discipline in Greece, where a number of late 19th- and early 20th-century scholars sought to disprove the thesis of Greek racial discontinuity (notable examples include Kyriakos Pittakis and Constantine Paparrigopoulos; Paparrigopoulos demonstrated in 1843 that Fallmerayer's theory had many pitfalls). On account of his insistence on the Slavic origin of the modern Greeks, Fallmerayer was considered a pan-Slavist by many in Greece, a characterization which in any case stood in opposition to his actual writings on contemporary politics. Fallmerayer's name eventually became "a symbol for hatred of the Greeks", and Nikos Dimou wrote (only partly in jest) that he had been raised to imagine Fallmerayer as a "blood-dripping Greek-eater" (αιμοσταγή ελληνοφάγο). In the twentieth century the charge of "neo-Fallmerayerism" was occasionally used by Greek scholars in an attempt to discredit the work of certain Western European scholars, including Cyril Mango, whose work bore no actual relation to Fallmerayer's. (The charge was also heard outside of Greece, for example, in the course of a debate between Kenneth Setton and Peter Charanis.) The first modern Greek translation of Fallmerayer's work appeared in 1984.

Fallmerayer's account of the split between "Occident" and "Orient" hinged on his interpretation of the Russian Empire, which he perceived as a powerful blend of Slavic ethnic characteristics, Byzantine political philosophy, and Orthodox theology. Although he initially perceived this constellation with admiration, and viewed Russia as the potential savior of Europe from Napoleon, his view changed in the mid-1840s, perhaps as a result of his encounter with Fyodor Tyutchev, and he soon came to see Russia as the major threat to Western Europe. By the late 1840s he was convinced that Russia would conquer Constantinople and the Balkans, and perhaps further the Slavic lands of the Habsburg and Prussian Empires. In the mid-1850s he was overjoyed by the success of the European/Ottoman coalition in the Crimean War. Fallmerayer's account of East and West represented a crucial break from Hegel's idealistic philosophy of history, and has been characterized as a precursor to Samuel P. Huntington's "Clash of Civilizations" thesis.

== Selected works ==
- 1827: Geschichte des Kaisertums von Trapezunt (History of the Empire of Trebizond) (Munich).
- 1830: Geschichte der Halbinsel Morea während des Mittelalters. Teil 1: Untergang der peloponnesischen Hellenen und Wiederbevölkerung des leeren Bodens durch slavische Volksstämme (History of the Morea Peninsula during the Middle Ages. Part one: Decline of the Peloponnesian Hellenes and repopulation of the empty land by Slavic peoples) (Stuttgart).
- 1835: Welchen Einfluß hatte die Besetzung Griechenlands durch die Slawen auf das Schicksal der Stadt Athen und der Landschaft Attika? Oder nähere Begründung der im ersten Bande der Geschichte der Halbinsel Morea während des Mittelalters aufgestellten Lehre über die Enstehung der heutigen Griechen (What influence did the occupation of Greece by the Slavs have on the fate of the city of Athens and of the countryside of Attica? Or, a more detailed explanation of the theory regarding the origin of the present-day Greeks that was proposed in the first volume of the History of the Morea Peninsula during the Middle Ages) (Stuttgart).
- 1836: Geschichte der Halbinsel Morea während des Mittelalters. Teil 2: Morea, durch innere Kriege zwischen Franken und Byzantinern verwüstet und von albanischen Colonisten überschwemmt, wird endlich von den Türken erobert. Von 1250-1500 nach Christus (Part two: Morea, devastated by internal wars between the Franks and the Byzantines, and inundated by Albanian colonists, is finally captured by the Turks. From 1250 through 1500 A.D.) (Tübingen).
- 1843-44: Originalfragmente, Chroniken, Inschriften und anderes Material zur Geschichte des Kaisertums Trapezunt (Original fragments, chronicles, inscriptions, and other material on the history of the Empire of Trebizond) (Abhandlungen der Historischen Klasse der Bayerischen Akademie der Wissenschaften. Bd. 3, Abt. 3, pp. 1–159 and Bd. 4, Abt. 1, pp. 1–108). 3. Bandes available online 4. Bandes available online
- 1845: Fragmente aus dem Orient (Fragments from the Orient), 2 volumes (vol. I, vol. II) (Stuttgart). Available online
- 1852: Denkschrift über Golgotha und das Heilig-Grab: Der Evangelist Johannes, der jüdische Geschichtsschreiber Flavius Josephus und die Gottesgelehrtheit des Orients (Meditation on Golgotha and the Holy Grave: John the Evangelist, the Jewish historian Flavius Josephus, and the divine erudition of the Orient) (Abhandlungen der Historischen Klasse der Bayerischen Akademie der Wissenschaften. Bd. 6, Abt. 3, 643-88).
- 1853: Das Tote Meer (The Dead Sea) (Abhandlungen der Historischen Klasse der Bayerischen Akademie der Wissenschaften. Bd. 7, Abt. 1, pp. 39–144).
- 1857: Das albanesische Element in Griechenland. Abt. 1: Über Ursprung und Altertum der Albanesen (The Albanian element in Greece. Pt. 1: On the origin and antiquity of the Albanians.) (Abhandlungen der Historischen Klasse der Bayerischen Akademie der Wissenschaften. Bd. 8, Abt. 2, pp. 417–87).
- 1860-61: Das albanesische Element in Griechenland. Abt. 2 und 3: Was man über die Taten und Schicksale des albanesischen Volkes von seinem ersten Auftreten in der Geschichte bis zu seiner Unterjochung durch die Türken nach dem Tode Skander-Bergs mit Sicherheit wissen kann. (Pts. 2 and 3: What can be known with certainty about the deeds and fate of the Albanian people from their first appearance in history until their subjugation by the Turks after the death of Skanderberg.) (Abhandlungen der Historischen Klasse der Bayerischen Akademie der Wissenschaften. Bd. 8, Abt. 3, pp. 657–736 and Bd. 9, Abt. 1, pp. 3–110).
- 1861: G.M. Thomas, ed., Gesammelte Werke. Bd. 1: Neue Fragmente aus dem Orient. Bd. 2: Politische und kulturhistorische Aufsätze. Bd. 3: Kritische Versuche. (Collected works. V. 1: New fragments from the Orient. V. 2: Political and cultural-historical essays. V. 3: Critical essays.) (Leipzig). Available online
- 1877: G.M. Thomas, ed., Fragmente aus dem Orient (2nd edition, Stuttgart).
- 1913: H. Feigl and E. Molden, eds., Schriften und Tagebücher: Fragmente aus dem Orient. Neue Fragmente. Politisch-historische Aufsätze — Tagebücher (in Auswahl) (Writings and diaries: Fragments from the Orient, New fragments, Political-historical essays — Selections from the diaries) (Munich and Leipzig).
- 1943: E. Mika, ed., Byzanz und das Abendland: Ausgewählte Schriften (Byzantium and the West: selected writings) (Vienna).
- 1949: F. Dölger, ed., Hagion Oros oder der Heilige Berg Athos (Hagion Oros, or, the Holy Mount Athos) (Vienna).
- 1963: H. Reidt, ed., Fragmente aus dem Orient (Munich).
- 1978: F.H. Riedl, ed., Hagion Oros oder der Heilige Berg Athos (Bozen). ISBN 88-7014-008-3
- 1978: A. Kollautz, ed., Antrittsvolesung über Unversalgeschichte, gehalten zu Landshut am 20. November 1862 (Inaugural lecture on universal history, held at Landshut on November 20, 1862) (Der Schlern 52, pp. 123–39).
- 1980: Geschichte des Kaisertums von Trapezunt (reprint of 1827 edition) (Hildesheim). ISBN 3-487-00585-9
- 1984: E. Thurnher, ed., Reden und Vorreden (Speeches and Forewords) (Salzburg and Munich). ISBN 3-7025-0198-3
- 1990: E. Thurnher, ed., Europa zwischen Rom und Byzanz (Europe between Rome and Byzantium) (Bozen). ISBN 88-7014-576-X
- 2002: E. Hastaba, ed., Der Heilige Berg Athos (Bozen). ISBN 88-7283-174-1
- 2002: "Geschichte der Halbinsel Morea während des Mittelalters. Erster Theil"(Translation in Greek language. Τranslation-factual Pantelis Softzoglou. Editions Long March, Athens)

ISBN 960-87355-0-5 (Part one: History of the Morea Peninsula during the Middle Ages.Decline of the Peloponnesian Hellenes and repopulation of the empty land by Slavic peoples)

- 2003: N. Nepravishta, tr., Elementi shqiptar në Greqi (Albanian translation of Das albanesische Element in Griechenland) (Tirana). ISBN 99927-950-0-X
- 2007: Fragmente aus dem Orient (Bozen). ISBN 88-7283-254-3
- 2014: "Geschichte der Halbinsel Morea während des Mittelalters. Zweiter Teil" (Translation in Greek language. Τranslation-factual Pantelis Softzoglou. Appendix of the editor: Reading the Fallmerayer in the era of new czars. Editions Long March, Athens) ISBN 978-960-87355-1-4

(Part two: History of the Morea Peninsula during the Middle Ages. Morea, devastated by internal wars between the Franks and the Byzantines, and inundated by Albanian colonists, is finally captured by the Turks. From 1250 through 1500 A.D.) <http://www.oakke.gr/afises/2013-02-16-20-47-58/item/392> available in Greek the preface note of translator, the preface of writer and the appendix

== Sources ==
- G. Auernheimer, "Fallmerayer, Huntington und die Diskussion um die neugriechische Identität", Südosteuropa 47 (1998), 1–17.
- F. Curta, "Byzantium in dark-age Greece (the numismatic evidence in its Balkan context)", Byzantine and Modern Greek Studies 29 (2005), 113–45. PDF online
- W. Jens, ed., Kindlers neues Literatur-Lexikon (Munich, 1988–92). ISBN 3-463-43200-5
- T. Leeb, Jakob Philipp Fallmerayer: Publizist und Politiker zwischen Revolution und Reaktion (Munich, 1996). ISBN 3-406-10690-0
- P. Speck, "Badly ordered thoughts on Philhellenism", in S. Takacs, ed., Understanding Byzantium (Aldershot, 2003), 280–95. ISBN 0-86078-691-9
- E. Thurnher, Jahre der Vorbereitung: Jakob Fallmerayers Tätigkeiten nach der Rückkehr von der zweiten Orientreise, 1842–1845 (Vienna, 1995). ISBN 3-7001-2188-1
- E. Thurnher, ed., Jakob Philipp Fallmerayer: Wissenschaftler, Politiker, Schriftsteller (Innsbruck, 1993). ISBN 3-7030-0258-1
- E. Thurnher, Jakob Philipp Fallmerayers Krisenjahre, 1846 bis 1854: auf Grund der Briefe an Joseph und Anna Streiter in Bozen (Vienna, 1987). ISBN 3-7001-1197-5
- G. Veloudis, "Jakob Philipp Fallmerayer und die Enstehung des neugriechischen Historismus", Südostforschungen 29 (1970), 43–90.
- N. Wenturis, "Kritische Bemerkungen zu der Diskussion über die neugriechische Identität am Beispiel von Fallmerayer, Huntington, und Auernheimer", Südosteuropa 49 (2000), 308–24.
