= Spiridon Palauzov =

Russian historian

Spiridon Palauzov (Спиридон Палаузов; July 16, 1818, in Odessa – August 17, 1872, in Pavlovsk, Saint Petersburg) was a Russian historian of Bulgarian descent who studied the medieval and modern history of Bulgaria, Romania, the Czech Republic, Hungary and the Austrian Empire.

He also participated in the organization of the Aprilov National High School in Gabrovo. He was the son of Nikolay Palauzov, who laid the stone at the foundation of Aprilov National High School with its first school. From 1832 until 1840, he studied at the Richelieu Lyceum in Odessa, and from 1840 until 1843, studied at the University of Bonn, Heidelberg University, and the Ludwig-Maximilians-Universität München. On August 24, 1843, he defended a dissertation at the Ludwig-Maximilians-Universität München on ancient Greek economy.

He was elected a full member of the Imperial Society of Russian History and Antiquities in Moscow (1846).

Palauzov introduced the concept of the Golden Age of medieval Bulgarian culture in Bulgarian historiography.
