= Arnold Borisovich Dumashevski =

Russian lawyer

- Born: 28 December 1836; Mogilev, Mogilev Governorate, Russian Empire
- Died: 22 November 1887 (aged 50); Saint Petersburg, Russian Empire
- Resting place: Preobrazhenskoe Jewish Cemetery
- Education: Richelieu Lyceum; University of St. Petersburg

Arnold Borisovich Dumashevski (Russian: Арнольд Борисович Думашевский; 28 December 1836 – 22 November 1887) was a Russian lawyer and writer.

== Biography ==
Dumashevski was born in Mogilev, Russian Empire. He received his first instruction in the ḥeder, and as a boy helped his father in the tailoring and carriage trades. At the age of thirteen he was a clerk in a bookshop, but ran away from home the following year to enter the Gorigoretzk Agricultural School, from which he graduated in 1855. During this time he was left entirely to his resources. By his exceptional abilities he attracted the attention of his instructors, who took a great interest in him.

After leaving the school Dumashevski found employment at the office of the Foreign Emigration Committee in Odessa. Here he was noticed by the Russian surgeon and philanthropist Pirogov, who helped him to enter the Richelieu Lyceum of that city; and there he studied law. Later he attended the University of St. Petersburg, graduating in 1862. Here again his abilities attracted the attention of the authorities, and he was sent abroad at the expense of the government to complete his law studies, a professorship being promised him on his return. After his return in 1865 a new law was passed prohibiting Jews from occupying professors' chairs of legal and political science. He accepted a position in the Ministry of Education, and later he served in the Ministry of Justice, by which, for valuable services on the Committee for Reforming the Legislation of Poland, he was appointed first secretary of the third department of the Senate.

== Work ==
Dumashevski was for many years one of the editors, and finally the owner, of the Sudebnyi Vyestnik ('Messenger of Judicial Affairs'), and was the author of a number of articles and works on jurisprudence. His chief work is Sistematicheski Svod Ryesheni Kassatzionnavo Departamenta ('Systematic Collections of the Decisions of the Appeal Department of the Senate'). He also wrote "Nuzhen li Zhournal dlya Yevreyev i na Kakom Yazyke?" ('Do the Jews Need a Special Periodical, and in What Language?', in Russky Invalid, 1859), "Brak po Bibleiskomu i Talmudicheskomu Pravu" ('Marriage According to Biblical and Talmudic Law', in Biblioteka dlya Chteniya, 1861), and Yevrei Zemledyeltzy v Rossii ('Jewish Agriculturists in Russia', in Vyestnik Imper. Russkavo Geogr. Obshchestya).

Dumashevski advocated a practical tendency in the study of civil law, opposing the historico-philosophical side; and at the same time he was a partizan of the dogmatic development of Russian civil law. In his will, he left 36,000 rubles to the University of St. Petersburg under the condition that this be entered as a gift "from the Jew Dumashevski."
