= Stefan Nedev Karagiosov =

Stefan Karagiosov (Стефан Карагьозов)
- Born: Stefan Nedev Karagiosov; 1818; Tarnovo, Ottoman Empire (now Bulgaria)
- Died: 1879 (aged 60–61); Tarnovo
- Occupations: Industrialist, grantor

Stefan Karagiosov (Bulgarian: Стефан Карагьозов) was an industrialist and philanthropist from Tarnovo, which for virtually all his life was in the Ottoman Empire.

== Biography ==
Stefan Karagiosov was born in 1818 in the village of Prisovo near Tarnovo (today Veliko Tarnovo). The elder son of Nedjo Karagiosov and Anastsija. He had three brothers – Nikoli, Dimitar and Angel.

== Working experience and activities ==
Stefan Karagiosov studied in Tarnovo. All the four brothers started own business – merchants in Tarnovo and Constantinople (today Istanbul). In 1860 Stefan Karagiosov established the first factory in Tarnovo for bread alcohol from maize. In 1861 Stefan Karagiosov built the first silk factory in Tarnovo with his business partner Doino Vichenti from Bergamo (Italy). They bought machines from Italy and developed their entrepreneurship. Since 1862 the silk factory opened branch in Gabrovo. In 1869 Doino Vichenti left Bulgaria and Stefan Karagiosov became the only owner of the two factories in Tarnovo and Gabrovo. Stefan Karagiosoff built a bid and powerful flour mill in Tarnovo. Using the scraps of food from the mill and bread alcohol company, Stefan Karagiosov fattened 250 – 300 animals per year.

== Charity ==
Stefan Karagiosov donated a lot of money for different charity organizations, schools, churches and monasteries in Tarnovo and the region.

== Other activities ==
Stefan Karagiosov was the first master in Tarnovo and member of the Tarnovo municipality, adviser of the Turkish governor in Tarnovo.

== Family ==
Stefan Karagiosov had three children – two sons and one daughter. The daughter Venka married general Stefan P. Salabashev. The son Krastjo was born in 1860 in Tarnovo. He lived in Kjustendil and worked as a governor of the town during the First World War. The son Nikola was born in Tarnovo too. He was a soldier in Sofia after graduating the Military Academy in Russia. Stefan Karagiosov is an uncle of Vasil Nikolov Karagiosov.

== Sources ==
- Колева Елена, Колева Ивелина, „Мястото на фамилия Карагьозови в историята на България“, сп. Минало, бр. 2, 2011
- Енциклопедия България, С.1982, с.330
- "Бележити търновци", С.1985 г., с. 170
- Д-р Цончев Петър, "Из стопанското минало на Габрово",Габрово, 1929;1996,с.329
- Д-р Цончев Петър, "Из общественото и културно минало на Габрово - исторически приноси", Габрово, 1934/1996 г., с.705
- "Човеколюбива болница на светите безсребреници Козма и Дамян", "Цариградски вестник" Тонков Тихомир по материали от ТДА - ВТ, "Велико Търново отблизо",бр. 61, април-май/2008 г., с.6-7
- Николов Григор, "По пътя от богатството до Бога", сп. "Мениджър - преди и след пърлвия милион", октомври 2008, с.80
- инж. Карагьозова Веселинка, "Биографична справка за Васил Карагьозов", Габрово, 2006 г.
- Карагьозов Божидар, "Чудният даскал - първият европеец в Габрово",в-к "Габрово днес",бр.19/22.03.1991 г.,с.8
- Кираджиев Светлин,"Велико Търново", С.2007, с.43
- Радев Иван, "История на Велико Търново XVIII - XIX век", "Слово", В.Т., 2000, стр.605
