= Richelieu Lyceum =

Located in Ukraine

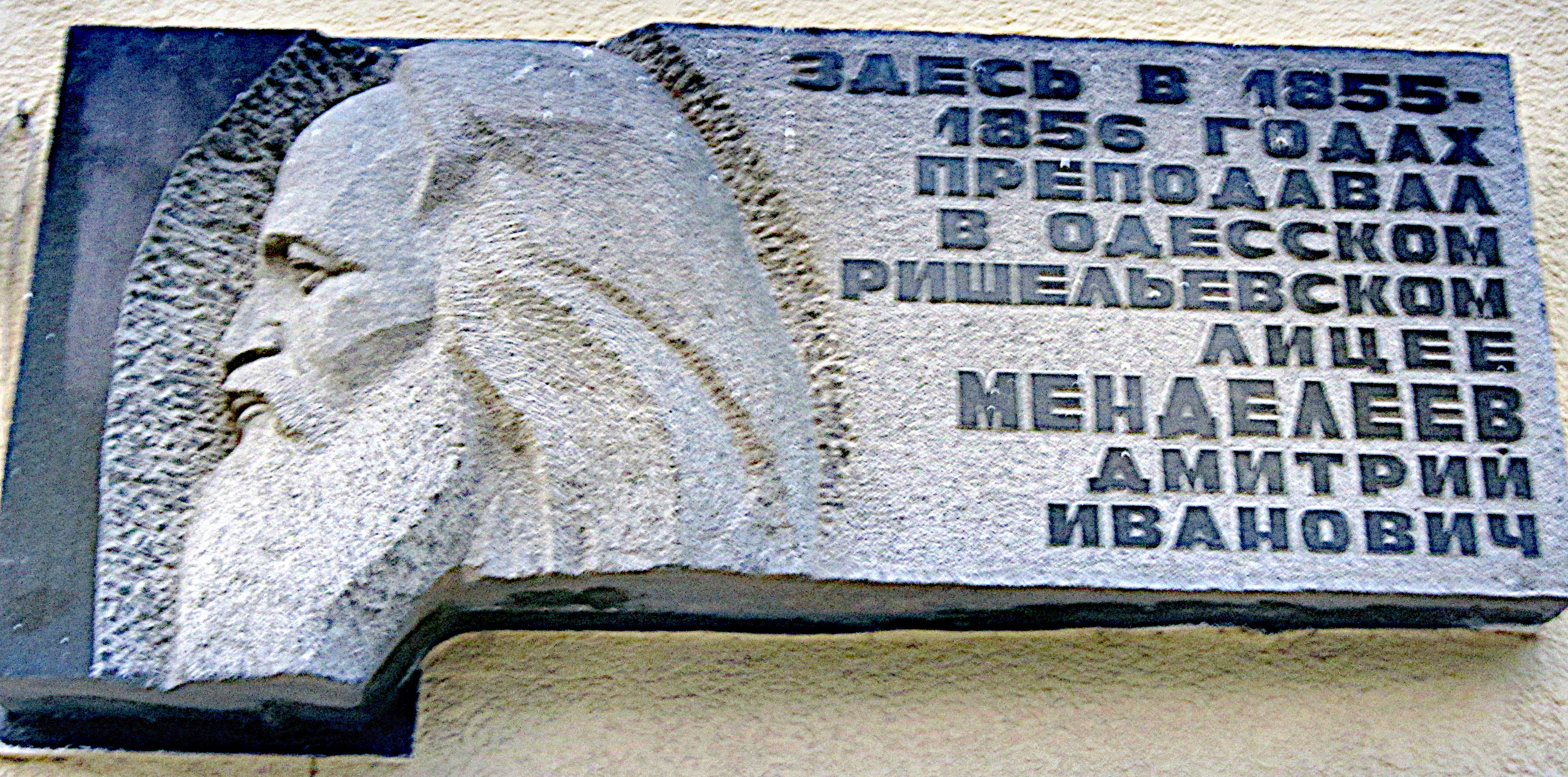
The memorial plaque of Dimitri Mendeleev.

The Richelieu Lyceum (Russian: Ришельевский лицей) in Odesa, the Russian Empire, was a lyceum created on the initiative of the mayor of the city and the governor of New Russia, the Armand-Emmanuel de Vignerot du Plessis, duc de Richelieu.

It existed from 1817 to 1865, when it became the basis of Odesa University.

The Lyceum prepares personnel for the Balkans under a previous Greek Project and reflects Russia's conservative view of establishing a "new order" in the Balkans after the Congress of Vienna (see Eastern question).

The Lyceum graduates include Spiridon Palauzov (who introduced the concept of the Golden Age of medieval Bulgarian culture); Nikolay Palauzov (first trustee and co-sponsor of Aprilov National High School); Nayden Gerov (initiator of the first celebration of the Day Of Slavonic Alphabet, Bulgarian Enlightenment and Culture); Constantine Paparrigopoulos - the father of modern Greek historiography.

During the academic year 1855/1856, i. at the end of the Crimean War, Dmitri Mendeleev taught in the Lyceum.

== Modern lyceum ==
In 1989, on the basis of the Odesa secondary school No. 36, a secondary educational institution called the Richelieu Lyceum (now the Richelieu Scientific Lyceum) was opened. The modern lyceum is located at Elisavetinskaya (Shchepkina) street, 5. The lyceum is closely connected with Odesa University and is designed to work with gifted students interested in the natural and mathematical sciences.

== Notable alumni ==
- Volodymyr Antonovych, historian
- Nikolai Fyodorovich Fyodorov, philosopher
- Nikolay Palauzov, journalist
- Vasile Stroescu, philanthropist and politician

== See also ==
- Orlov revolt
- Filiki Eteria
- Wallachian uprising of 1821
- Akkerman Convention
- Treaty of Adrianople (1829)
- Treaty of Hünkâr İskelesi
