= Aprilov (surname) =

Aprilov (Bulgarian: Априлов) is a Bulgarian male surname, its feminine counterpart is Aprilova. It may refer to

- Boris Aprilov (1921–1995), Bulgarian writer, playwright, satirist, and humourist
- Vasil Aprilov (1789–1847), Bulgarian educator
