= Constantine Paparrigopoulos =

Greek historian (1815–1891)

- Κωνσταντίνος Παπαρρηγόπουλος
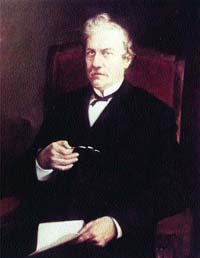
- Born: 1815; Constantinople, Ottoman Empire
- Died: 14 April 1891 (aged 75–76); Athens, Greece
- Scientific career
- Fields: History
- Institutions: National and Kapodistrian University of Athens

Signature
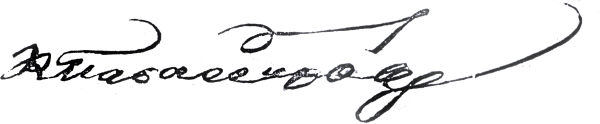

Constantine Paparrigopoulos (Greek: Κωνσταντίνος Παπαρρηγόπουλος; 1815 – 14 April 1891) was a Greek historian, who is considered the founder of modern Greek historiography. He is the founder of the concept of historical continuity of Greece from antiquity to the present, establishing the tripartite division of Greek history in ancient, medieval and modern, and sought to set aside the prevailing views at the time that the Byzantine Empire was a period of decadence and degeneration.

Paparrigopoulos introduced this division in his teaching at the University of Athens. His main work is the multi-volume History of the Greek Nation (Ιστορία του Ελληνικού Έθνους), covering the history of the Greeks from ancient to modern times, and notably including the Greek Middle Ages as part of the national history of Greece. He is also known for vigorously countering the theories of Jakob Philipp Fallmerayer regarding the racial origins of the Greeks. He was the first historian who managed to demonstrate that Fallmerayer's theory was false.

== Life ==
Paparrigopoulos was born in Constantinople in 1815. His father, a native of Vytina, was killed by the rabble of Constantinople when the Greek War of Independence erupted in 1821. Paparrigopoulos not only saw this grisly spectacle, but he also attended the execution of his brother, Michael, and of his two uncles. His mother, who survived the slaughters, fled to Odessa, where Paparrigopoulos accomplished his studies at the Richelieu Lyceum as a bursar of the Tsar Alexander I.

In 1830 Paparrigopoulos travelled to Greece to study in the "Central School" (Κεντρικό Σχολείο) of Aegina, founded by the Greek leader Ioannis Kapodistrias. He continued his studies in the universities of France and Germany.

Returning to Greece, Paparrigopoulos was appointed in the ministry of Justice, but in 1845 he withdrew because he did not yet possess a Greek nationality. He was reappointed as a teacher when he obtained the Greek nationality (as a "Gortynian"). In 1851 he became a professor of history of the National and Kapodistrian University of Athens.

In 1873 Paparrigopoulos lost his son, Dimitrios Paparrigopoulos. In 1876 and 1884 the Greek state utilised him for national purposes, appointing him as president of the "National Defence" and as president of the "Exhibition of the relics of the War of Independence".

== Work ==
In 1843, while working in the Ministry of Justice, Paparrigopoulos published his first survey, About the emigration of Slav tribes in Peloponnese, contradicting with robust arguments Fallmerayer's opinion that modern Greeks are of Slav descent, having no racial relation with the ancient Greeks. In 1844, he published his second survey, The last year of the Greek independence, treating the fall of Corinth. In 1855 he gave his inaugural lecture as professor of the university, contradicting a theory that did not recognise the importance of the Dorian influence on the civilization of ancient Greece.

Nonetheless, his monumental writing is the History of the Greek nation, comprising 6 volumes, which were later complemented by Pavlos Karolidis. Paparrigopoulos published the first volume in 1860 and completed his work in 1877 with the last volume, which constituted a synopsis of the Greek War of Independence. The best edition of the History of the Greek nation is the edition of Eleftheroudakis in 1925 with the application of Karolidis. In this work he adopted the tripartite examination of periods already introduced by Spyridon Zampelios (ancient Hellenism, medieval Hellenism, modern Hellenism) and used it as a tool for the narration of the course of the Greek nation throughout the centuries.

== Assessments ==
Paparrigopoulos is considered the "national" historian of modern Greece. In his History of the Greek Nation, he regarded the history of Greece from the ancient years till nowadays as a unity, insisting on the continuity of the Greek nation. At the same time he promoted the importance of the Byzantine Empire and of the Byzantine history in general. Because of his profound surveys, the disdain towards the Byzantine history was limited.

The interpretation of Byzantium's Greek character in the work of Sp. Zampelios was the first step in the effort to refute Fallmerayer's theory. It was supported that the ancient Greek civilization had not faded away, but had been creatively reshaped as it met Christianity, which took place during the Byzantine Empire. With Zampelios then, the foundations were prepared in order for a total national history to be written, in order for the past, the continuous course of the Greek nation from antiquity till the 19th century, to be narrated. This ambitious project was undertaken and completed by Constantine Paparrigopoulos, who is considered for this reason the founder of Greek national historiography, also known as Greek historism.

Paparrigopoulos, as well as Sp. Zampelios, set the basis of the modern Greek historiography and influenced the modern Greek society. Since, their work did not concern only a closed and restricted circle of specialists and academics. It was addressed to the society of their times, in order to strengthen their national self-knowledge. Paparrigopoulos' classes at the University, which constituted the raw material for the writing of his memorable History, were frequently published in Pandora magazine, of which he was the co-publisher, as well as in the Athenian Press. The term Greek-Christian which was devised for scientific purposes, functioned towards the same direction but did not remain a simple instrument of analysis in the hands of specialists. As this term appeared in early ninth century, it became a canvass on which the ideology of the Greek state was developed and shaped. The content of education, the orientation of historical studies and the study of tradition (folklore) were organized on this basis. In addition, the Megali Idea (Greek Great Idea) which was nebulous until that time, acquired flesh and bones. The Byzantine Empire, which had now been acclaimed a cultural mold of the Greek state which was still small, became the model for its territorial expansion.

Paparrigopoulos wrote on both Greek history, spanning from ancient Greece to modern Greece, and modern Hellenism.

== His writings ==
All his main writings are in Greek.

- About the emigration of Slav tribes in Peloponnese, 1843.
- The last year of the Greek independence, 1844.
- Elements of General History, 1845.
- General History, 2 volumes, 1849.
- Introductory lesson, 1855.
- History of the Hellenic nation, 6 volumes, 1860-1877.

== Sources ==
- C. Paparrigopoulos (and in later editions, P. Karolidis), History of the Greek Nation, Volume I, Biography of Constantine Paparrigopoulos by Pavlos Karolidis, Editions: Eleftheroudakis, 1925 (in Greek).
- Encyclopaedic Dictionary, The Helios, Volume 15, article: "Constantine Paparrigopoulos" (in Greek).
