= Koljo Karagiosov =

Koljo Karagiosov Кольо Карагьозов
- Born: Koljo Vasilev Karagiosov; 1896; Gabrovo, Bulgaria
- Died: 1972 (aged 75–76); Gabrovo, Bulgaria
- Occupations: industrialist, grantor, German honorary vice-consul

Koljo Karagiosov (born July 17, 1896 in Gabrovo – 1972) was an industrialist from Gabrovo. He held the honorary vice-consul position for Germany.

He was the only son of Vassil Karagiosov and Deshka Kalpazanova. He was a grandson of Ivan Kolchev Kalpazanov. He studied the Gabrovian Gymnasium. Koljo Karagiosov played viola and did paintings. Then became student in Legal in the town of Erlangen (Germany), but a few years later he graduated Handel Hochschule in Leipzig.

== Working experience ==
He worked as an accountant in Gabrovo and later, in 1926, he took the management of the family textile company. As an industrialist Koljo Karagiosov travelled to Germany many times and bought new machines for the factory.

In 1934, Koljo Karagiosoff became German honorary vice consul. In the field of business and in the field of diplomacy, he developed commercial and diplomatic relations between Bulgaria and Germany.

He was Company's first director up to 1947 when the Communist government nationalized the private property in Bulgaria. He and many Bulgarian industrialists were punished by the Communist Government. They were imprisoned and sent into exile because of their foreign education, knowledge, skillfulness and wealth. In the camps in Nojarevo and Belene these men worked and lived like prisons tormented by the supervisors. The Socialist party stained the reputation of all of them, announced them “enemy of the nation” and cruelly chased them. Koljo Karagiosov died in 1972.

== Charity ==
Karagiosov donated money for different charity organizations, schools, churches and monasteries – The Gabrovian Library, The Women Charity organization “Mother Care” and the Red Cross. He helped his father supplying the Zograph Monastery with provisions which he bought in Bulgaria and sent them in Mount Athos.

== Family ==
He had three children – two sons and a daughter. The elder son Vassil was born in Leipzig in 1920. He lived in Pleven and worked as a musician – piano player. The second son Bozhidar was born in Gabrovo. He worked in a PVC manufacturing company and was a singer in the Military choir in Gabrovo. The daughter Veselinka graduated engineer in Plovdiv. She worked in the field of Milk industry and Catering establishment. She was a skillful teacher too.

== Sources ==
- инж. Карагьозова Веселинка, „Биографична справка за Васил Карагьозов”, Габрово, 2006
- Карагьозов Божидар, „И докоснах написаното с върха на пръстите си”, в-к „Габрово днес”, бр. 36, 13.06.1991 г.
- Колева Ивелина, Колева Елена, „Васил Карагьозов – in memoriam”, сп. „Минало”, бр. 2, 2008 г., с. 88-96
- в-к „Балкански екъ”, бр. 62, 04.12.1943 г., с. 4
- Колева Елена, Колева Ивелина, „Мястото на фамилия Карагьозови в историята на България“, сп. Минало, бр. 2, 2011
- Колева Елена, Колева Ивелина, "Кольо Василев Карагьозов - достойният наследник на своите деди", в-к Габрово днес, 21 юли 2011г., стр. 4
- Колева Елена, Колева Ивелина, "Да продължиш достойно делото на своите деди", в-к 100 вести, бр. 16 юли 2011 г., стр. 7
- Илимонков Ив., "Анонимно акционерно дружество за търговия и индустрия Иванъ К.Калпазановъ - Габрово", в-к "Таласъмъ", 1933 г., с. 2
