= Vasil Aprilov =

Bulgarian educator (1789–1847)

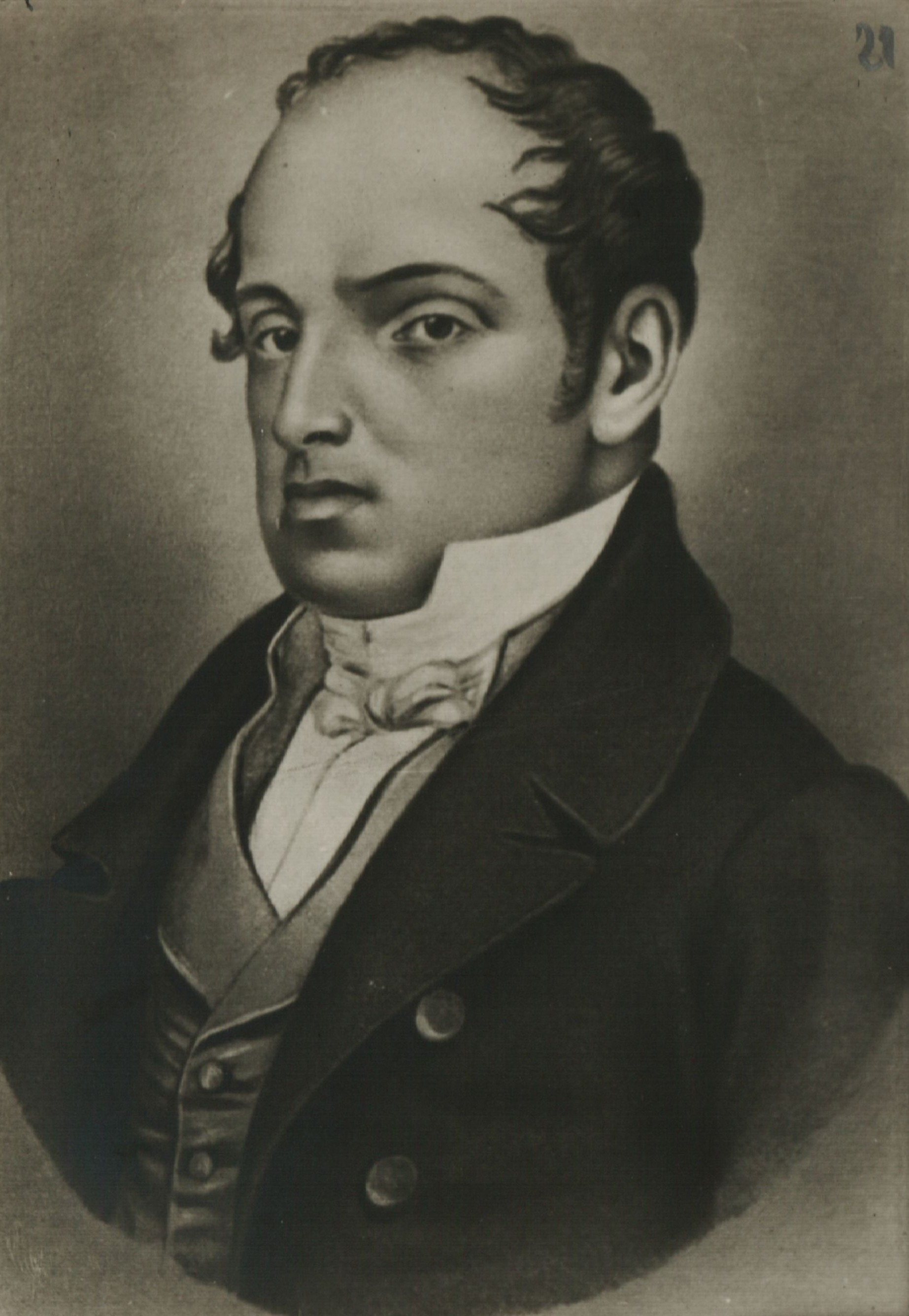
- Depiction of Aprilov
- Born: 21 July 1789; Gabrovo, Ottoman Empire
- Died: 2 October 1847 (aged 58); Galaţi, Moldavia
- Citizenship: Russian

Vasil Evstatiev Aprilov (Bulgarian: Васил Евстатиев Априлов; 21 July 1789 – 2 October 1847) was a Bulgarian educator, merchant, philanthropist, writer and a national activist. Aprilov was a leading figure of the Bulgarian National Revival. He contributed to the establishment of secular Bulgarian education and the modern Bulgarian school.

== Life ==
Vasil Evstatiev Aprilov was born in Gabrovo, Ottoman Empire (now Bulgaria), on 21 July 1789, to a rich merchant family. In that period, Gabrovo was an important center of manufacture and trade. He was raised as a Hellenophile. Aprilov went to a cell school in his hometown. At the age of 11, after the death of his father, he went to Moscow in the Russian Empire, where his brothers Hristofor and Nikofor traded cotton and rose oil. He went to study at a Greek school because working in trade required proficiency in Greek. Aprilov continued his education at a grammar school in Braşov. The city harbored Bulgarian refugees and many of its inhabitants were from his hometown. Since he was classified as an orphan, it is likely that the school gave him a scholarship too. In 1807, he entered the University of Vienna to study medicine but he did not have the opportunity to graduate due to an illness and the bad financial situation of his brothers.

In 1809, he returned to the Russian Empire and received citizenship. From 1811 he became a merchant in Odessa along with his brothers. In the Nizhyn Greek Registry, he was classified as a Greek. He assisted volunteers from Odessa who wanted to participate in the Greek War of Independence and after retiring from trade in 1826, he gave large sums of money to the Greek educational movement. However, in 1830, he came into a dispute with the Greeks and went to Constantinople. Inspired by the reforms there, he came up with the idea to create a European-style school. After leaving Constantinople, under the influence of Yuriy Venelin's book "The Ancient and Present Bulgarians" (1829), he abandoned his Hellenophilia and adopted Bulgarian nationalism in 1831. Afterward, he worked to shift Bulgarian education and culture toward Russia and away from Greece.

In 1832, he suggested the establishment of a school in the hometown to Nikolay Palauzov. On 2 January 1835, he established the Aprilov High School in Gabrovo, with education in Bulgarian. This was the first Bulgarian secular school using the Bell-Lancaster method. Aprilov and Palauzov had contributed 2,000 groschen for the school, while monk Neofit Rilski started working as a teacher there. The Greek archbishop of Tarnovo had also encouraged their efforts and the Bulgarian émigrés from Bucharest also contributed money. The emergence of this school gave a boost to Bulgarian education and soon other schools were opened all over the Bulgarian-populated regions of the Ottoman Empire. Both he and Rilski remained members of the Ecumenical Patriarchate. Aprilov also came into contact with Venelin in 1836 and financially supported him, until his death in 1839. He offered stipends for Bulgarian students for studying in the Russian Empire, starting with four stipends in 1840. On 15 September 1843, the Holy Synod of the Russian Orthodox Church allowed him to send books to four churches in the area of Gabrovo. Aprilov died on 2 October 1847, in Galaţi, Moldavia (now Romania), from tuberculosis. In his will, he had written that he dedicated his savings for the education of the Bulgarians. Aprilov also had 60,000 rubles in his bank account, which were to be used for his Gabrovo school.

== Works, views and legacy ==
Aprilov collected folk songs and sent them to Venelin. He published a booklet called Bulgarian letters or to which Slavic people does the Cyrillic alphabet actually belong? in 1841, where he disputed the claim by Dimitrije Tirol that Cyril and Methodius were of Serb origin. In the same year, he published Dawn of the new Bulgarian education. In 1845, in Odessa, he published Bulgarian charters, a collection of historical texts about Bulgarian tsars Kaloyan and Ivan Shishman. In his 1845 address Letter to my fellow countrymen, he urged Bulgarians to work on having Bulgarians appointed in episcopal sees. Until 1847, all of his works were written in Russian, while his book Ideas about the current Bulgarian education, which he published in Odessa, was his first book in Bulgarian.

He was among the first Bulgarians to write about the Bulgarian revival and traced its beginning to the abolition of the Janissaries in 1826 and implementation of the Tanzimat reforms. Aprilov thought that liturgical Greek should be taught alongside Bulgarian. He regarded Russian education as more progressive than Greek education. For him, the school curriculum was to be secular, rationalist and patriotic. Eastern Bulgarian was his proposal for the basis of literary Bulgarian.

Aprilov Point on Greenwich Island, South Shetland Islands, Antarctica, is named in his honor. A monument of him is in Gabrovo.
