= Zlatniyat vek =

- Златният век
- Genre: Historical, Drama
- Directed by: Luben Mortchev
- Original language: Bulgarian
- No. of seasons: 1
- No. of episodes: 11

Production
- Producer: Bulgarian National Television
- Running time: 51 minutes

Original release
- Network: Bulgarian National Television
- Release: 27 January 1984

Zlatniyat vek is a Bulgarian historical and drama TV series produced in 1984.

== History ==
The movie was dedicated to 1300 anniversary of foundation of Bulgaria.

== Cast overview ==
Cast overview:

- Marius Donkin - Tzar Simeon
- Rumyan Lazov
- Kiril Yanev
- Vasil Mihajlov
- Bogomil Simeonov
- Ivan Yordanov
- Ivan Kondov
- Kameliya Nedkova
- Anya Pencheva
- Anrieta Dalova
- Petko Petkov
- Stoyan Mindov
