= Vasil Nikolov Karagyozov =

Vasil Karagiosov Васил Карагьозов
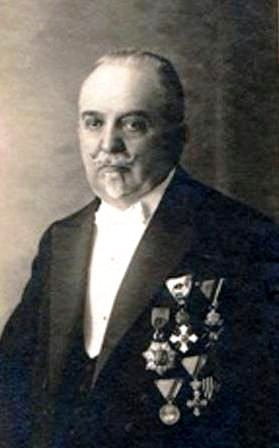
- Born: Vasil Nikolov Karagiosov; 1856; Tarnovo, Ottoman Empire (now Bulgaria)
- Died: 1938 (aged 81–82); Zograph Monastery, Mount Athos, Greece
- Occupations: Teacher, industrialist, grantor, politician, German honorary vice-consul, monk

Vasil Nikolov Karagiosov (Bulgarian: Васил Николов Карагьозов) was a Bulgarian teacher, politician, industrialist and honorary German vice-consul in Gabrovo.

== Biography ==
Vasil Nikolov Karagiosov was born in Tarnovo (today named Veliko Tarnovo) on June 14, 1856. Close friend with Sava Mutkurov and Stefan Stambolov since their childhood. He was sent abroad to study and get education of higher quality by his mother and uncle Stefan Nedev Karagiosov. He graduated "Politechnicum” of Stuttgart in and Technische Hochschule München. He also learnt German, French, English, painting, music, singing, piano and viola playing, bon-ton. He studied the German history and visited all the Museums in the country. There he met Prince Ferdinand von Saxe-Coburg und Gotha and they became close friends. Their friendship went on even when King (Tsar) Ferdinand of Bulgaria was banished in Koburg in 1918. Their close friendship ended when Wassil Karagiosoff died. Between 1919-1933, Vassil Karagiosov visited King Ferdinand of Bulgaria few times in Koburg.

== Professional activities ==
Vasil Karagiosov first jobs was a teacher of Descriptive geometry and Drawing in the Real male gymnasium in Gabrovo (1881–1889).

On September 21, 1881, Vasil Karagiosov met the famous craftsman Ivan Kolchev Kalpazanov who had a dream – to build his own textile factory in Gabrovo. He had enough money, he needed textile machines but he could not speak any foreign languages. Ivan Kolchev Kalpazanov asked Vasil Karagiosov if he could help him. Vasil Karagiosov took the challenge with great pleasure, wrote a letter and addressed it “To the most famous and celebrated textile company in Germany”. Accurate German post clerks sent the letter to the town of Chemniz, the factory of Richard Hartman. In December 1881, Vasil Karagiosov and Ivan Kalpazanov visited the company, chose suitable machines and signed contracts. Vassil Karagiosov and Ivan Kalpazanov were the men who delivered the first German machines in Gabrovo.

On November 13 and 14, 1882, The first textile factory in Gabrovo was inaugurated.

== Family ==
Vasil Karagiosov became son-of-law in the Kalpazanov family as he married their first daughter Deshka. Regretfully, on July 22, 1889, Ivan Kalpassanoff died. The whole family – his wife Velika and his children empowered Vasil Karagiosov for director of the family factory.

Vasil Karagiosov had 4 children: Venka, Vella, Koljo, and Ivanka.

== Business merits ==
During the years of being Head manager, Vasil Karagiosov travelled to Germany many times, he bought new machines and built new industrial buildings. In 1892, he bought a new steam machine from Belgium and employed Ivan Nedkov as a mechanic - operator. In 5 years, Ivan Nedkov was sent to the town of Chemniz for specialization.

During 1922, for first time in Gabrovo, Vasil Karagiosov arranged all retired workers to receive pensions from 100 to 600 BGN per month. Money was allocated from the factory profits and accumulated into an own pension fund.

Between 1926 - 1933, Vasil Karagiosov became German honorary vice consul. The consulate office was situated in his own house in the centre of Gabrovo. German banners hanged on the second floor with the enamel “Deutsches Consulat” sign. He was the first German vice consul in the town. In 1934, he left the town and established himself in Mount Athos – Greece as a monk. Koljo Karagiosov became the new German vice consul. By the end of 1934, the consulate office was moved to Varna.

Karagiosov was awarded with medals of different kind and became cavalier of many orders, received by King Ferdinand of Bulgaria, King Boris III and the Grand Vizier of Turkey.

== Monastic life ==
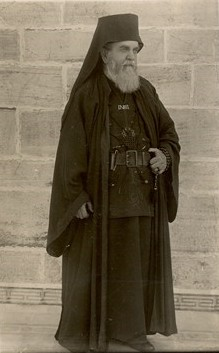
Schema Viniamin in 1934

After the death of his wife, Karagiosov became a monk at Mount Athos, serving as secretary of the Zograph Monastery. He took the name Viniamin, and was ordained a Great Schema in 1934. Patrick Leigh Fermor met him in 1935, as described in The Broken Road. According to Fermor, Karagiosov became a monk because at Monte Carlo a couple of years earlier, he "had so narrowly escaped drowning that he attributed his life to God's intervention."

Karagiosov died on March 31, 1938.

== Sources ==
- инж. Карагьозова Веселинка, „Биографична справка за Васил Карагьозов”, Габрово, 2006
- Карагьозов Божидар, „И докоснах написаното с върха на пръстите си”, в-к „Габрово днес”, бр. 36, 13.06.1991 г.
- Колева Ивелина, Колева Елена, „Васил Карагьозов – in memoriam”, сп. „Минало”, бр. 2, 2008 г., с. 88-96
- в-к „Балкански екъ”, бр. 62, 04.12.1943 г., с. 4
- Колева Елена, Колева Ивелина, „Мястото на фамилия Карагьозови в историята на България“, сп. Минало, бр. 2, 2011
- Колева Елена, Колева Ивелина, "Кольо Василев Карагьозов - достойният наследник на своите деди", в-к Габрово днес, 21 юли 2011г., стр. 4
- Колева Елена, Колева Ивелина, "Да продължиш достойно делото на своите деди", в-к 100 вести, бр. 16 юли 2011 г., стр. 7
- Илимонков Ив., "Анонимно акционерно дружество за търговия и индустрия Иванъ К.Калпазановъ - Габрово", в-к "Таласъмъ", 1933 г., с. 2
