= Golden Age of Bulgaria =

Period in Bulgarian history

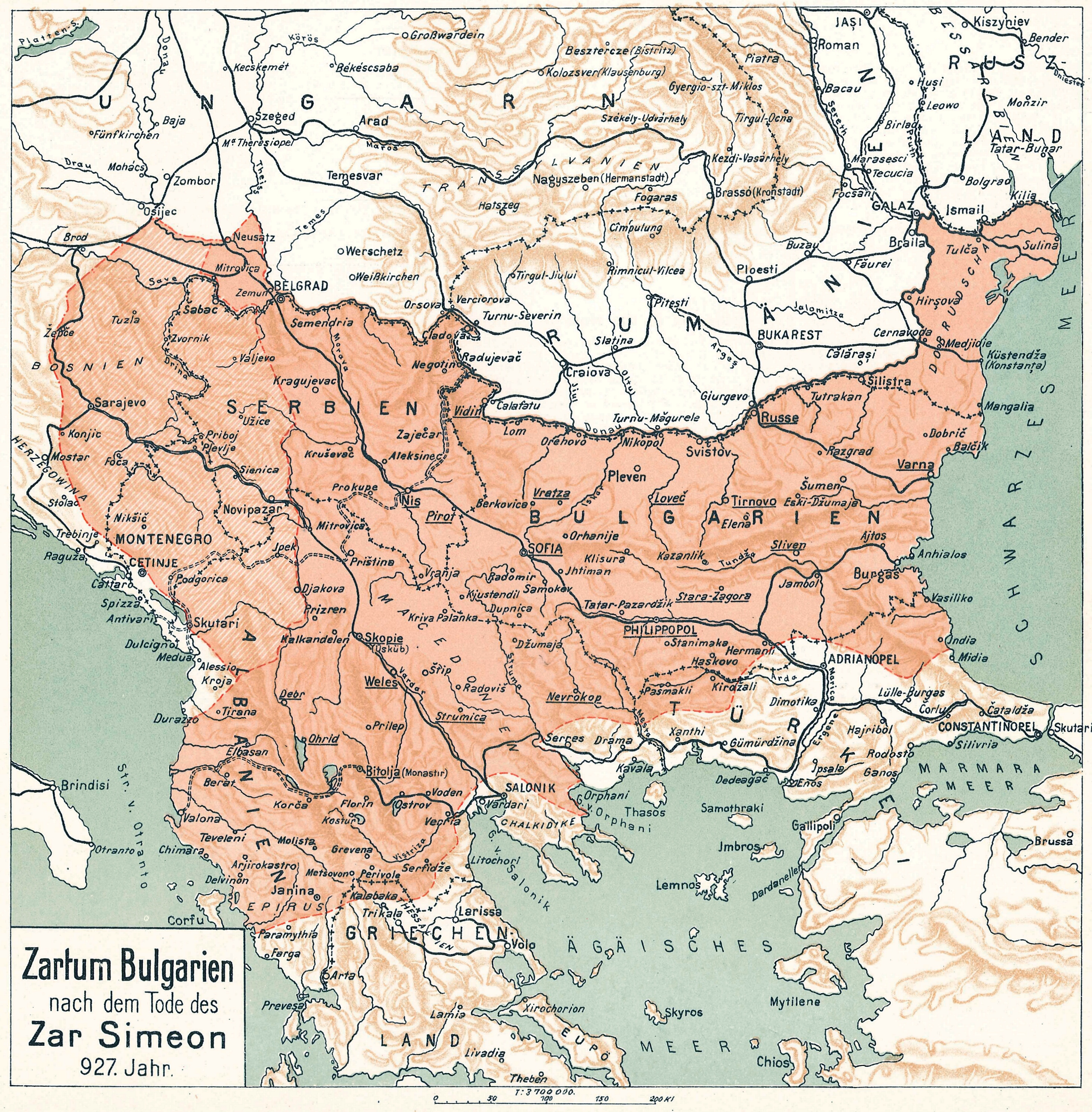
First Bulgarian Empire, early 10th century (904)

The Golden Age of Bulgaria is the period of the Bulgarian cultural prosperity during the reign of emperor Simeon I the Great (889—927). The term was coined by Spiridon Palauzov in the mid 19th century. During this period there was an increase of literature, writing, arts, architecture and liturgical reforms.

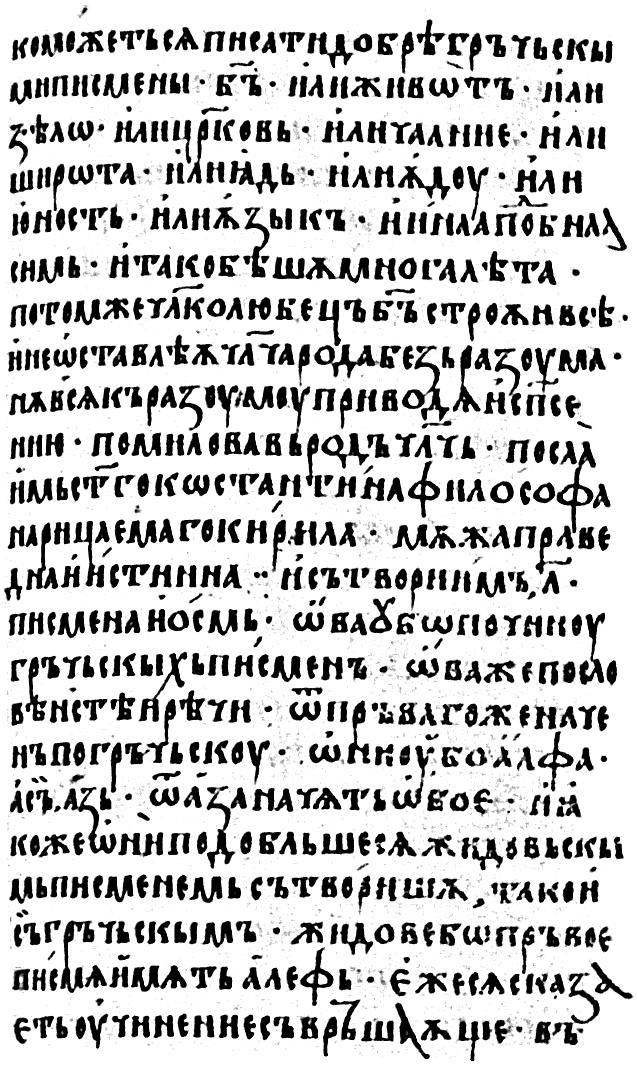
A page from the oldest (1348) copy of “On the Letters”

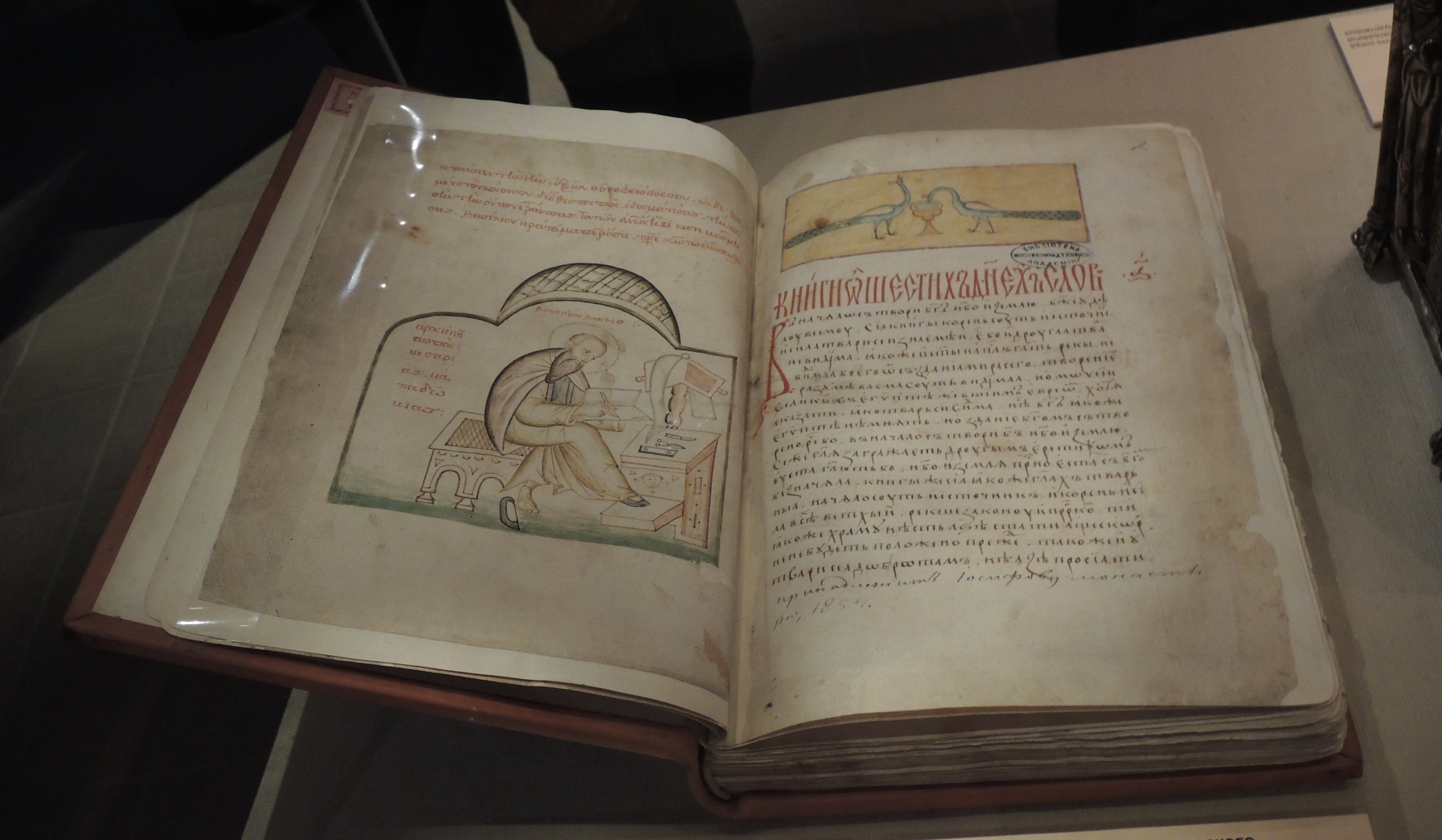
John the Exarch's Hexameron, 15th century Russian translation

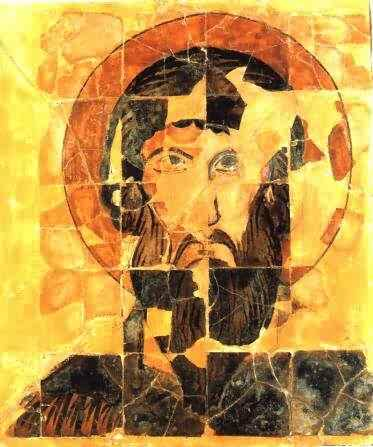
Ceramic icon of St Theodore Stratelates, Preslav, c. 900 AD, National Archaeological Museum, Sofia

Simeon I achieved spectacular military and political successes, expanding Bulgarian territory and forcing the Byzantine Empire to recognise the imperial title of the Bulgarian monarchs. The capital Preslav was built in Byzantine fashion to rival Constantinople. Among the city's most remarkable edifices were the Round Church, also known as the Golden Church, and the imperial palace. At that time the Preslavian pottery was created and painted, which followed the most prestigious Byzantine models. A chronicle of the 11th century testified that Simeon I had built Preslav for 28 years.

Simplified floor plan

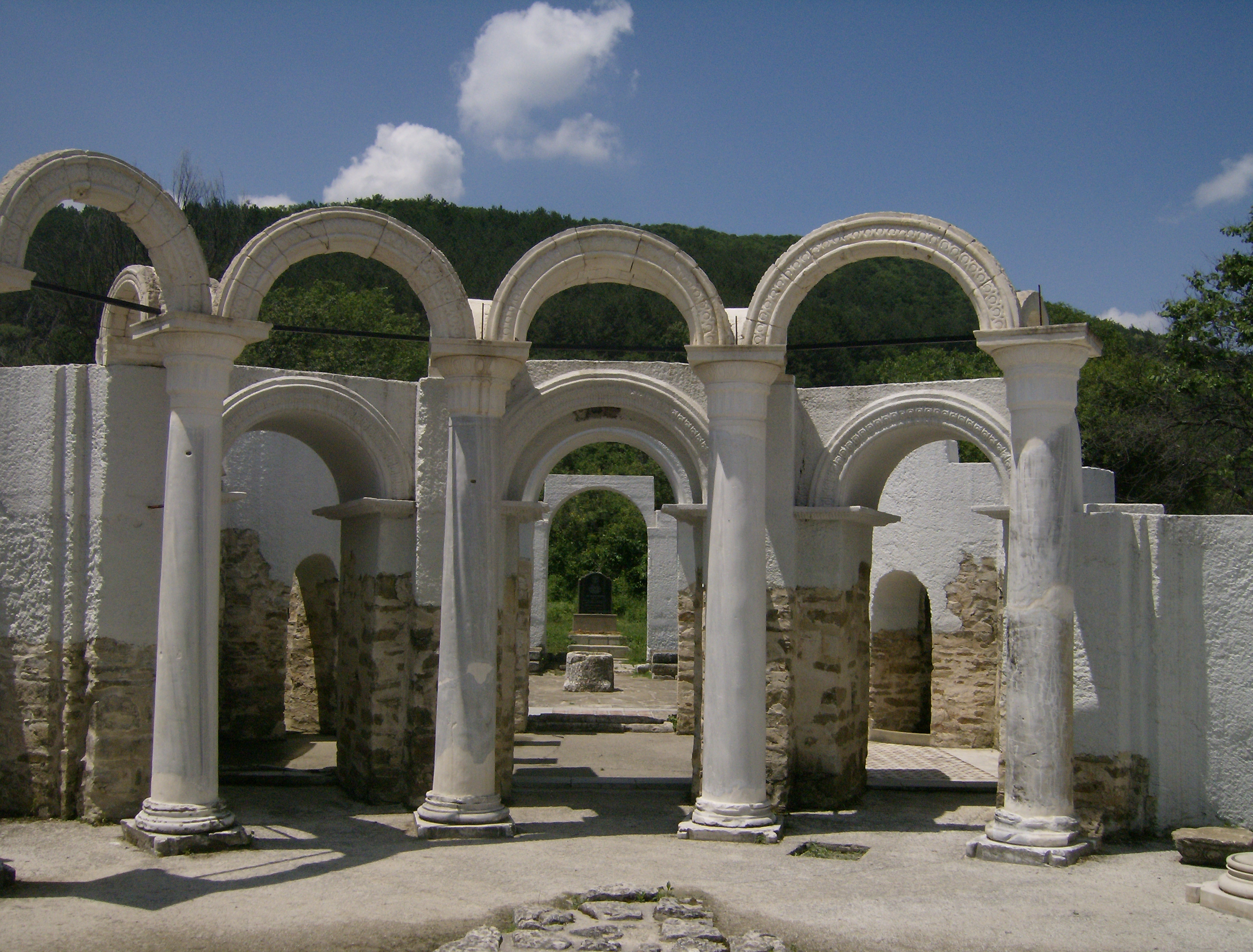
Preslav

Simeon I gathered around himself the so-called Simeon's circle, that included some of the most prominent literary authors in medieval Bulgaria. Simeon I himself is alleged to have been active as a writer: works that are sometimes credited to him include Zlatostruy (Golden stream) and two of Simeon (Svetoslavian) collections (first in transcript of 1234, and the second - in 1299).

The most important genres were Christian edifying oratory eulogies, lives of saints, anthems and poetry, chronicles, and historical narratives. Remarkable works include Hexameron by John Exarch, Didactic Gospel (including the Alphabet prayer) by Constantine of Preslav, An Account of Letters by Chernorizets Hrabar. The names of the other authors of Simeon circuit were Tudor Dox, Prester John and Prester Gregory but none of their works are preserved. They were all venerating the liturgy in Old Bulgarian language and the Cyrillic script created in Bulgaria few years before the reign of Simeon I, during the reign of his father Boris I of Bulgaria. Clement of Ohrid and Naum of Preslav created (or rather compiled) the new alphabet which was called Cyrillic and was declared the official alphabet in Bulgaria in 893. The Old Bulgarian, also called Old Church Slavonic, language was declared as official in the same year. In the following centuries the liturgy in Bulgarian language and alphabet were adopted by many other Slavic peoples and counties.

== See also ==
- Pliska-Preslav culture
- Christianization of Bulgaria
- Cyrillic script
- Early Cyrillic alphabet
- First Bulgarian Empire
- History of Bulgaria
- Medieval Bulgarian literature
- Ohrid Literary School
- Preslav Literary School
- Relationship of Cyrillic and Glagolitic scripts
- Third Rome
- Day of the Holy brothers Cyril and Methodius, of the Bulgarian alphabet, education and culture and of the Slavonic literature
- Tarnovo Literary School
- Art School of Tarnovo
- Painting of the Tarnovo Artistic School
- Architecture of the Tarnovo Artistic School

== Literature ==
- Nikolov, A. The Perception of the Bulgarian Past in the Court of Preslav around 900 AD. - In: State and Church: Studies in Medieval Bulgaria and Byzantium. Ed. by V. Gjuzelev and K. Petkov. American Research Center in Sofia: Sofia, 2011, 157-171
