= Ivan Kalpazanov =

Ivan Kalpazanov (Иван Калпазанов)
- Born: Ivan Kolchev Kalpazanov; 1835; Gabrovo, Ottoman Empire (now Bulgaria)
- Died: 1889 (aged 53–54); Gabrovo
- Occupations: industrialist, grantor, ancestor of the modern industry in Gabrovo and Kingdom of Bulgaria (1882)

Ivan Kolchev Kalpazanov (Bulgarian: Иван Колчев Калпазанов) was an industrialist, ancestor of the modern industry in Gabrovo and Kingdom of Bulgaria (1882).

== Biography ==
Ivan Kolchev Kalpazanov was born in 1835 in the village Kalpazani near Gabrovo. His father Kolcho was a merchant who traveled in Bulgaria and Turkey to sell knives. His uncle Ivancho Penchov Kalpazanov was a famous Gabrovian public character.

== Working experience ==
Kolcho Kalpazanov died too young when his elder son Ivan was only 17-year-old. He had to take care for his mother, eight brothers and sisters. Both Ivan Kolchev Kalpazanov and his cousin Petko Kalpazanov opened a small shop for different goods as sugar, rice, candles, coffee, textiles, etc. and made a small workshop for clothes there too.

Later Ivan Kolchev Kalpazanov studied how to manufacture woollen cords. He became the most skillful manufacturer in Gabrovo.

In 1857 Ivan Kolchev Kalpazanov visited the first modern factory in Sliven (established in 1834) and he decided to build his own textile factory. Ivan Kolchev Kalpazanov made his own research for his future factory. On September 21, 1881 Ivan Kolchev Kalpazanov met the young Vasil Nikolov Karagiosov and asked him to find a company for textile machines in Germany, because he was informed that German machines ware of the best technical quality.

Vasil Nikolov Karagiosov sent a letter signed “To the most famous and celebrated textile company in Germany”. Accurate German post clerks sent the letter to the town of Chemniz, the factory of Richard Hartman.

Ivan Kolchev Kalpazanov realized he could not build the factory all alone because that was an expensive investment. He took for a partner Petko Cokev – a Gabrovian craftsman.

In December 1881 Vasil Karagiosov and Ivan Kalpazanov visited the company of Richard Hartmann, chose suitable machines and signed contracts. Vassil Karagiosov and Ivan Kalpazanov were the men who delivered the first German machines in Gabrovo.

On November 13 and 14, 1882 the first textile factory in Gabrovo was inaugurated.

== Charity ==
Ivan Kolchev Kalpazanov donated money for different charity organizations, churches and monasteries.

== Family ==
Ivan Kolchev Kalpazanov and his wife Velika Stojanova had 7 children. The first daughter Deshka married Vasil Nikolov Karagiosov. The daughter Stojanka married the famous d-r Petar Conchev. Sons Nikola and Dobri developed active charity activities for the Red Cross in Gabrovo. Today their names are signed by the entrance of the building. The youngest son Dimitar was killed during the Balkan Wars in 1912.

== Sources ==
- „Книга на габровската индустрия”, 1934 г., с. 33
- в-к „Балкански екъ”, бр. 62, 04.12.1943 г., с. 4
- Колева Елена, Колева Ивелина, "Как Габрово стана Българският Манчестър", сп. „Минало“, бр. 4, 2009, стр. 63-72
- инж. Карагьозова Веселинка, „Биографична справка за Васил Карагьозов”, Габрово, 2006
- Колева Ивелина, Колева Елена, „Васил Карагьозов – in memoriam”, сп. „Минало”, бр. 2, 2008 г., с. 88-96
- Карагьозов Божидар, „С поглед към Европа – чудният даскал първият европеец в Габрово”,

в-к „Габрово днес”, бр. 19, 22.03.1991 г., с.8
