= Charles Alan Fyffe =

English historian

Charles Alan Fyffe (3 December 1845 – 19 February 1892) was an English historian, who was also well known as a journalist and a political candidate.

== Life ==
He was the son of Lawrence Hay Fyffe, M.D. of Blackheath, by Mary Prudence, daughter of John Ord, born at Lee Park, Blackheath, on 3 December 1845. He was educated at Christ's Hospital, and obtained an open exhibition at Balliol College, Oxford, 1864. He graduated B.A. in 1868 and M.A. in 1870.

In 1871, Fyffe was elected a fellow of University College, and for many years acted as the bursar. He acted as correspondent to the Daily News during the first part of the Franco-Prussian War, and was in Paris during the commune, where he was taken for a spy.

Fyffe entered Lincoln's Inn on 10 June 1873. He later transferred to the Inner Temple (26 May 1876), where he was called to the bar on 10 May 1877. He joined the south-west circuit, but never practiced.

== Politics ==
Fyffe had strong Liberal views, and was president of the Oxford Union in 1867. In 1870, in Macmillan's Magazine, he wrote that "Liberalism has become co-extensive with intelligence". His activism was influenced by T. H. Green.

Fyffe held views as a land law reformer and was one of the founders of the free land league. His views on land reform were broadly supported by Sir Charles Dilke; they were more in line with the ideas of Henry George than those of Henry Hyndman, or the land nationalisation of Alfred Russel Wallace. His evidence for the Report on Small Holdings of 1888–90 was that demand for smallholdings could be very high. He was an unsuccessful candidate for the city of Oxford in the Radical interest at the general election of 1885.

== Court case and death ==
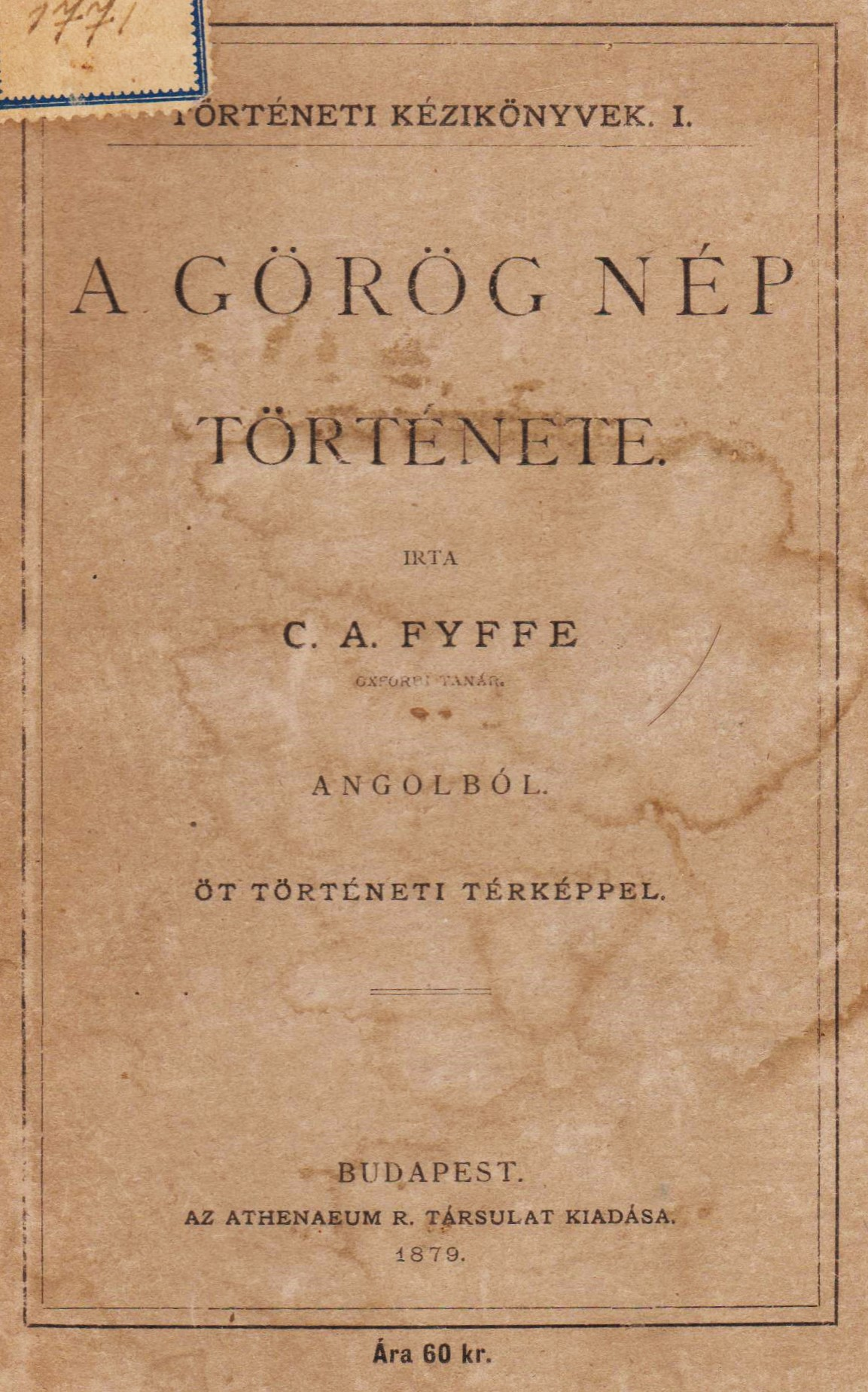
History of Greeks (Hungarian edition, 1879)

In 1891, Fyffe was a prospective parliamentary candidate at Devizes. A charge was brought to court against him at Wiltshire Assizes. It was thrown out, but Fyffe attempted suicide. Early biographies were reticent about the details. Newspaper reports from overseas were that the charge was of improper assault; John Richard Robinson appeared as a witness for Fyffe. The charge was brought by a young fellow-passenger on the Brighton Railway.

Fyffe did not recover from his suicide attempt, and died on 19 February 1892 at Laughton Hall, Edinburgh. He was buried at Buncton in Sussex.

== Works ==
In 1875, Fyffe published a small school history of Greece, which sold well. His History of Modern Europe was in three volumes (1880, 1886, 1890) and passed through subsequent editions.

== Family ==
Fyffe married, on 7 June 1883, Henrietta Frances Arnaud, the only child of Waynflete Arnaud Blagden of Holmbush Ashington, Sussex, by whom he left three children.

Children of Charles Alan Fyffe & Henrietta Frances Arnaud Blagden

1. Alan Herbert Fyffe 1884-1939 England Cricketer & J.P.
2. Mary Constance Fyffe 1885-1964 Married Lt.-Col Ivor Picton-Turbervill
3. Ronald Laurence Fyffe 1887-1901
