= At the Foot of Vitosha =

1911 play by Peyo Yavorov

At the Foot of Vitosha (Bulgarian: В полите на Витоша) is a 1911 Bulgarian play by Peyo Yavorov. It premiered at the Bulgarian National Theatre in 1912. It was written after the untimely death of Mina Todorova, with whom Yavorov was in love. Although the play was influenced by the personal experiences of the author, it also deals with eternal themes of love, pride, political bias and the pernicious corruption of power, as the author "passionately, mercilessly dissects social relationships in bourgeois Bulgaria".

== Plot ==
Theatre World describes "At the Foot of Vitosha" as "an old-fashioned drama about a bartered bride who rebels against middle-class prejudice and family interests". At the centre of the play are two young lovers, whose doomed love leads to tragedy, similar to that of Romeo and Juliet. Mina's sister, the conservative Stefano Dragodanoglu, turns out to be a rival in the political struggles of her lover Christopher Hristoforov, a liberal.
