= Nikolay Palauzov =

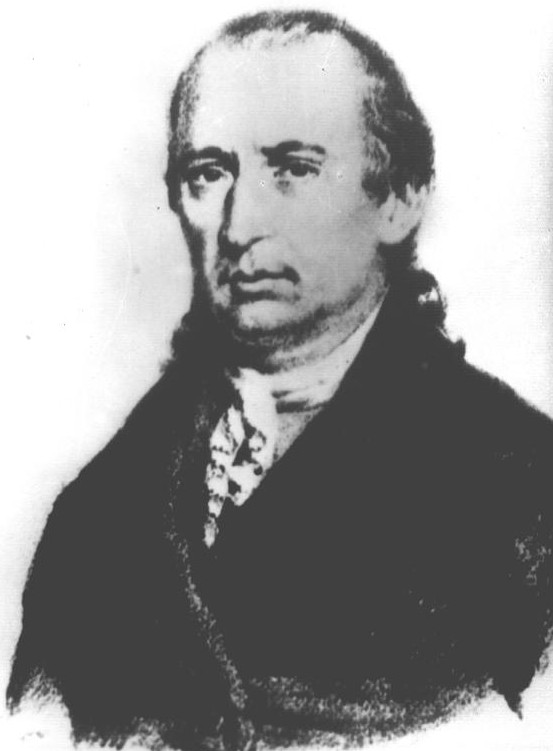

Nikolay Hristoforovich Palauzov (Bulgarian: Николай Христофорович Палаузов; 1821 – 2 March 1899) was a Bulgarian-Russian journalist and a Bulgarian Renaissance activist.

Palauzov was born in Gabrovo. He initially studied in his home town and in 1842 graduated from Richelieu Lyceum in Odessa. During his period in Odessa Palauzov was given a Russian citizenship. He was among the founders of the Bulgarian Board of Trustees in Odessa and its president until the end of his life. Through his work Palauzov won the Bulgarian cause important Russian activists and policy makers. He also translated from Russian into Bulgarian and worked for newspapers in Odessa and Carigrad.
