= Racho Stoyanov =

Bulgarian writer, playwright and translator

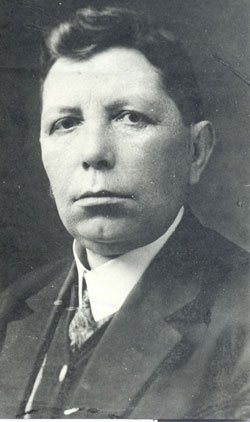

Racho Stoyanov Genov-Dufev (October 7, 1883 – January 12, 1951) was a Bulgarian writer, playwright and translator. He started his literary career early, with publications dating back to 1904, and received important critical attention by already renown authors as Anton Strashimirov and Konstantin Velichkov.

Stoyanov’s first collection ‘Stories’ (Razkazi, 1909) was followed by his most famous work, the popular drama ‘Masters’ (Maistori, 1922).

Stoyanov is normally placed along as a realist in the tradition of Yordan Yovkov. Being extremely demanding and doubtful regarding his own works is partly considered to be the reason to publish only one more work in his lifetime: the popular novella ‘Mother Magdalena’ (Maika Magdalina, 1936).

Although all of his works were met with critical acclaim and the writer himself was also an established translator (of authors as Rudyard Kipling, Robert Louis Stevenson, Jack London, Louis Bromfield, Fyodor Dostoevsky etc.) he left a vast amount of unfinished works, including novellas, stories, dramas and articles. They were discovered and published posthumously in 1976, among them the novellas ‘Valchi Dol’ and ‘Doganovi’, as well as an unfinished memoir. He never married and his manuscripts were left over to his sister.

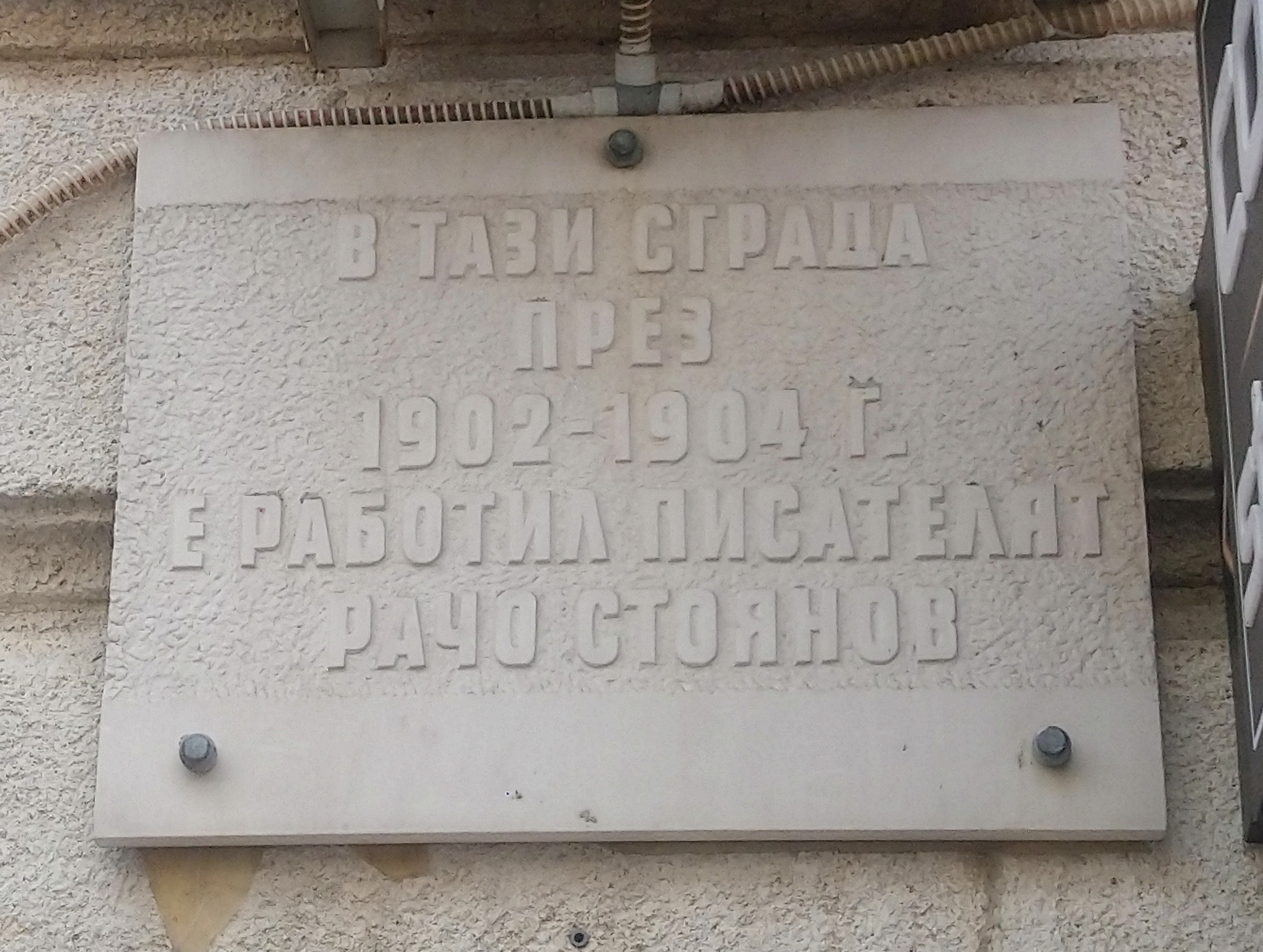
Memorial plaque to Racho Stoyanov in Varna, where he lived in 1902-1904

He studied and lived in Gabrovo, Varna and Sofia (nowadays the theater in Gabrovo carries his name) and a national literary prize on his name is awarded each three years.

== Bibliography ==
Smirnov, Atanas; Kranzov, Georgi, “The Known and Unknown Racho Stoyanov” (introduction), In: Stoyanov, Racho, “The Selected Works”, 2 vols, Sofia, 1976, pp. 5–15.

Gardev, Borislav, “The Mystery Racho Stoyanov”, In: Liternet

Nagy, Peter; Rouyer, Phillippe; Rubin, Don, “World Encyclopedia of Contemporary Theatre: Volume 1: Europe”, London/New York, Routledge, 2013, pp. 158–159.
