= Book of the Prefect =

Byzantine commercial manual

The Book of the Prefect or Eparch (Greek: Τὸ ἐπαρχικὸν βιβλίον, romanized: To eparchikon biblion) is a Byzantine commercial manual or guide addressed to the eparch of Constantinople (the governor of the city with supreme judicial jurisdiction and the highest economic official, who had charge of, for example, tariffs and import/export regulation). Based on established customs and laws and now littered with later interpolations, the Book is an essential document in the economic history of Byzantium and the Mediterranean. The book was lost until 1891, when it was discovered in Geneva by the Swiss Jules Nicole, who referred to it as the Livre de l'Éparque. It is a prominent example of Byzantine encyclopaedism.

== Dating ==
The book is traditionally dated to the reign of Leo VI the Wise (886–912). However, whilst the first chapter concerning the entrance requirements to the college of notaries does probably date from Leo's reign (Leo was renowned for recodifying and tidying up Roman law), it seems that the work itself (like so many texts from this period) was the product of gradual accumulation. References in four places to tetartera coins show the work in its final form to be no earlier than the reign of Nikephoros II Phokas (963–69), who instigated this particular form of lightweight gold coinage. The absence of any mention of Rus’ merchants from the document, whilst other nationalities such as Bulgars and Syrians are mentioned, also indicates a late date—presumably after the breakdown of Byzantine–Rus' relations in 968.

== Contents ==
The Book of the Prefect is essentially a list of regulations concerning the collegia or private guilds that had existed in the Greek world since Roman times. As all trades were theoretically under governmental control, the Book of the Prefect is not exhaustive of all crafts. Instead, the book appears to highlight a cross-section of the areas where public interest and private went together, showing how a good city should be run to keep its black market under wraps.

The text is divided into twenty-two chapters, the first nineteen of which refer to specific guilds:

- Chapter 1 – the college of notaries (contract lawyers). This is the longest chapter in the work and, as it can probably be associated with the reign of Leo VI, predates the other chapters. The chapter sets strict regulations for entry into the college of notaries (for example stipulating that a candidate must have perfect knowledge of the law and know, amongst other things, the 40 titles of Manuel by heart.

The remaining chapters are much smaller than the first chapter and discuss eighteen other guilds, often with similar clauses indicating imposition of the regulations from above:

- Chapter 2 – dealers in bullion
- Chapter 3 – bankers
- Chapter 4 – silk stuff merchants
- Chapter 5 – merchants who import silk from Syria and Baghdad
- Chapter 6 – raw silk merchants
- Chapter 7 – raw silk dressers
- Chapter 8 – silk dyers
- Chapter 9 – linen merchants
- Chapter 10 – perfume merchants
- Chapter 11 – wax and taper merchants
- Chapter 12 – soap merchants
- Chapter 13 – grocers
- Chapter 14 – saddlers
- Chapter 15 – butchers
- Chapter 16 – pork merchants
- Chapter 17 – fishmongers
- Chapter 18 – bakers
- Chapter 19 – inn-holders

Some similar points from these clauses include regulations controlling the elections to guilds and their entrance fees, clauses advocating working together including rhetoric on not cheating others and having good quality produce, the setting of prices and profit margins, and the setting of the spheres of work and areas of the city in which they can operate to avoid competition between guilds.

The last three chapters concern the regulation of agents and contractors, as well as the administration of the Eparch's office and his use of deputies in customs inspections.

== Aims and effects ==
It is not known exactly why the Book of the Prefect was compiled; however, use of the guilds may have been a way for the Eparch to police the market, seeking order, a decrease in crime, and the guarantee of cheap supplies. The demarcation of guilds and control they got over their members shows there was a marrying of interests between the guilds and the state. However, it is important to stress that not all members of each profession were a member of their guild. Instead evidence from the text suggests that guilds were exclusive and privileged, and intended for the rich to get richer and the poor to get poorer. At one point the text mentions raw silk dressers who were not a member of their guild and had to buy silk at a higher price.

Another important reason for such imperial concern over commerce was for the efficient raising of a maximum of revenue through taxation.

== Enforcement ==
Many of the Book of the Prefect’s regulations must have been very hard to police (e.g. regulations stipulating that the merchants produce items of good quality), and it is likely that the laws were probably rarely enforced, and where they were it would depend more on co-operation from the guilds rather than on any action by the Eparch.

== Historiographic utility ==
The Book of the Prefect has an important place in medieval economic historiography, and is a unique source for the Byzantine economy in the age of Constantine Porphyrogenitus. Some of its many uses include its ability to help us recreate a commercial map of Constantinople, the light it throws on the Constantinopolitan economy and governmental controls over it, and questions concerning the regulation of trade between the Byzantine capital and its provinces.

== Translations and editions ==
The Book has been translated into English twice. Earlier, in 1893, a trilingual edition—in the original Greek, Latin, and French—was made by Jules Nicole, who discovered the only surviving manuscript in a Genevan library. New English translations of sections vi.31–33 and xx.56–57 have since been made by Lopez and Raymond (1951) using Nicole's Greek, but the translators call for completely updated English editions using the most recent Byzantine scholarship. In 1970 Variorum Reprints gathered Nicole's editions and Freshfield's English translation along with a photographic reproduction of the manuscript (Genevensis 23) appended to a new introduction by I. Dujčev. This collection was typically used by scholars until a translation was made into German with a new critical edition of the Greek.
