= Renaissance of the 11th century =

Period during the Middle Ages of European history

Italy in the 11th century

The expression Renaissance of the 11th century designates a historical phase of the Late Middle Ages characterized by renewed religiosity, but above all by economic development that brought about noticeable changes in social life.

Some historians have called this phase of cultural development, dated around the 11th century, the "Medieval Renaissance."

This appellation has been disputed by others, such as historian Girolamo Arnaldi, who recognizes as "Medieval Renaissances" only " [...] those of law and philosophy, in the 12th century, because the law that was revived was Roman law, codified by the Emperor Justinian, and the philosophy that came back into vogue was Greek philosophy, in particular Aristotle," and therefore one can speak of a Renaissance insofar as that of the 15th century would be characterized precisely by the revival of interest in Greek and Roman classicism.

For traditional historiography, this century is one of the “darkest” of the entire Middle Ages. But in this case the use of the term “renaissance” is clearly metaphorical. It stands for “revival.” However, the problem remains open, which is one of substance (and not just terminology or relating to the pure sphere of periodization), of a Renaissance civilization having behind it an economy in crisis or, at best, stagnant.

Konrad Burdach, a leading proponent of continuity between the Middle Ages and the Renaissance, believes that there was no break between the two periods, which thus constitute one great epoch. Burdach asserts that there was no break, and if one really wants to speak of a renaissance, one must even go back to the 11th century; in fact, he notes that the themes of the Lutheran Reformation were already contained in the medieval heresies, and that the Middle Ages and the Renaissance have the same source in common: the classical world.

The legend of fear for the end of the world

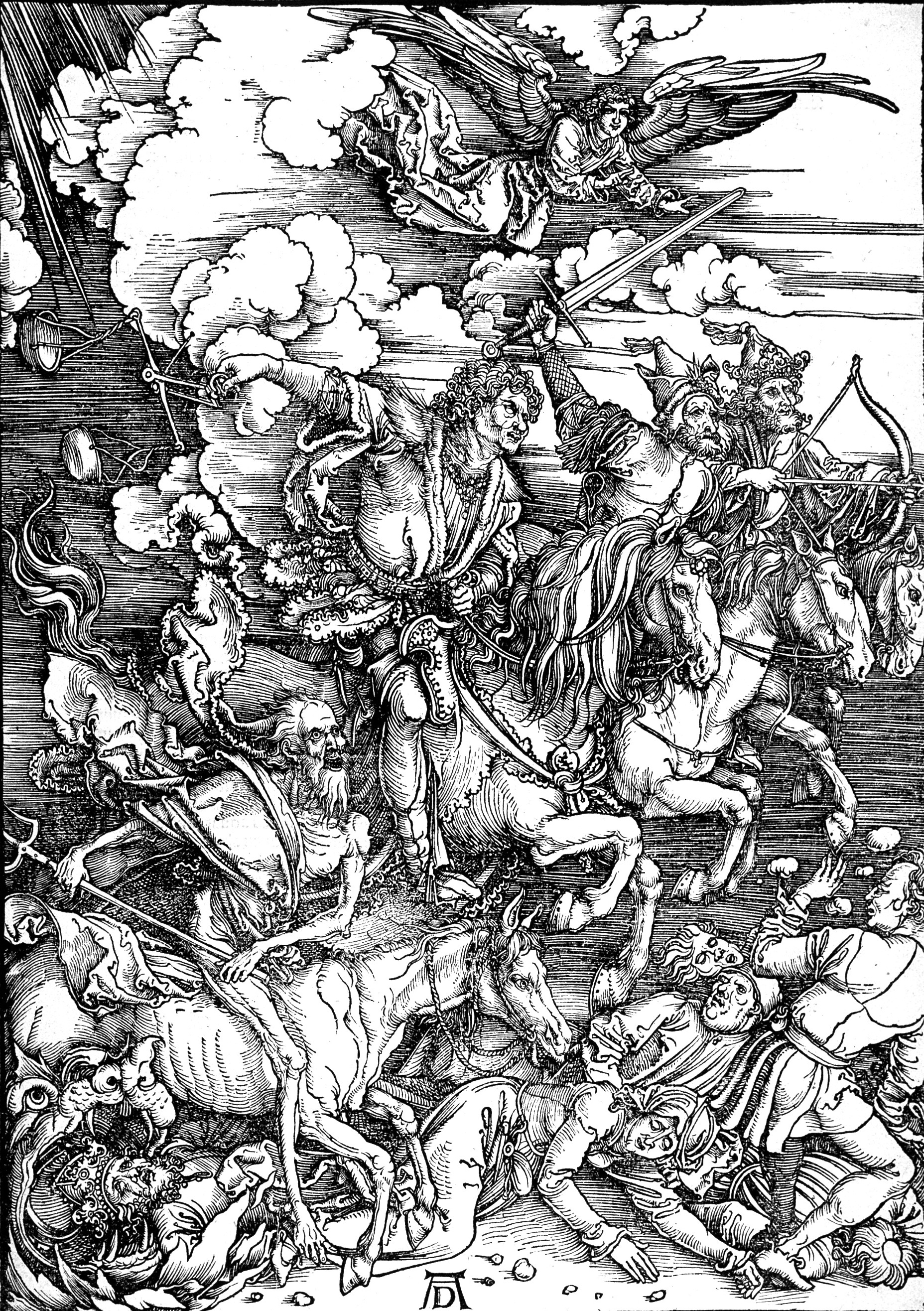
The four horsemen of the apocalypse, namely war, famine, death and disease, engraving by Albrecht Dürer

According to a legend that originated in the Renaissance, spread especially in the 19th century, and long believed to be a historical reality, towards the end of the 10th century the already troubled lives of the peoples of the West would have been hit by a wave of superstitious terror caused by folk tales based in part on Gospel texts. This belief would have been based on the saying “A thousand and a thousand no more,” attributed to Jesus Christ (but in fact not found in the canonical Gospels), interpreted to mean that at the end of the first millennium from the birth of Christ there would be the end of the world with universal judgment. In the Apocalypse of John there is also a verse in which the reference to “a thousand years” appears, but in the Middle Ages this passage was the source of completely different millenarian beliefs (the imminent beginning of the millennium of peace was expected, not its conclusion):

He seized the dragon, the old serpent, who is the devil and Satan, who deceives the whole inhabited earth, and bound him for a thousand years, and cast him into the abyss, and shut it and sealed it over him, that he should deceive the nations no more until the thousand years were finished. After this, he must be freed for a short time.

Historians today agree that these waves of collective fear never existed. In contrast to this “historical myth,” the new energies that burst out around the year 1000 throughout Western Europe, from the shores of the North Sea to the Po River plains and the valleys of the Apennines, were by no means generated by astonishment that the world had not been destroyed, but by a whole series of historical concomitances. European society was being reborn to new life, releasing those forces that had been slowly maturing over the centuries since the fall of the Western Empire.

== The Ottonian Renaissance ==
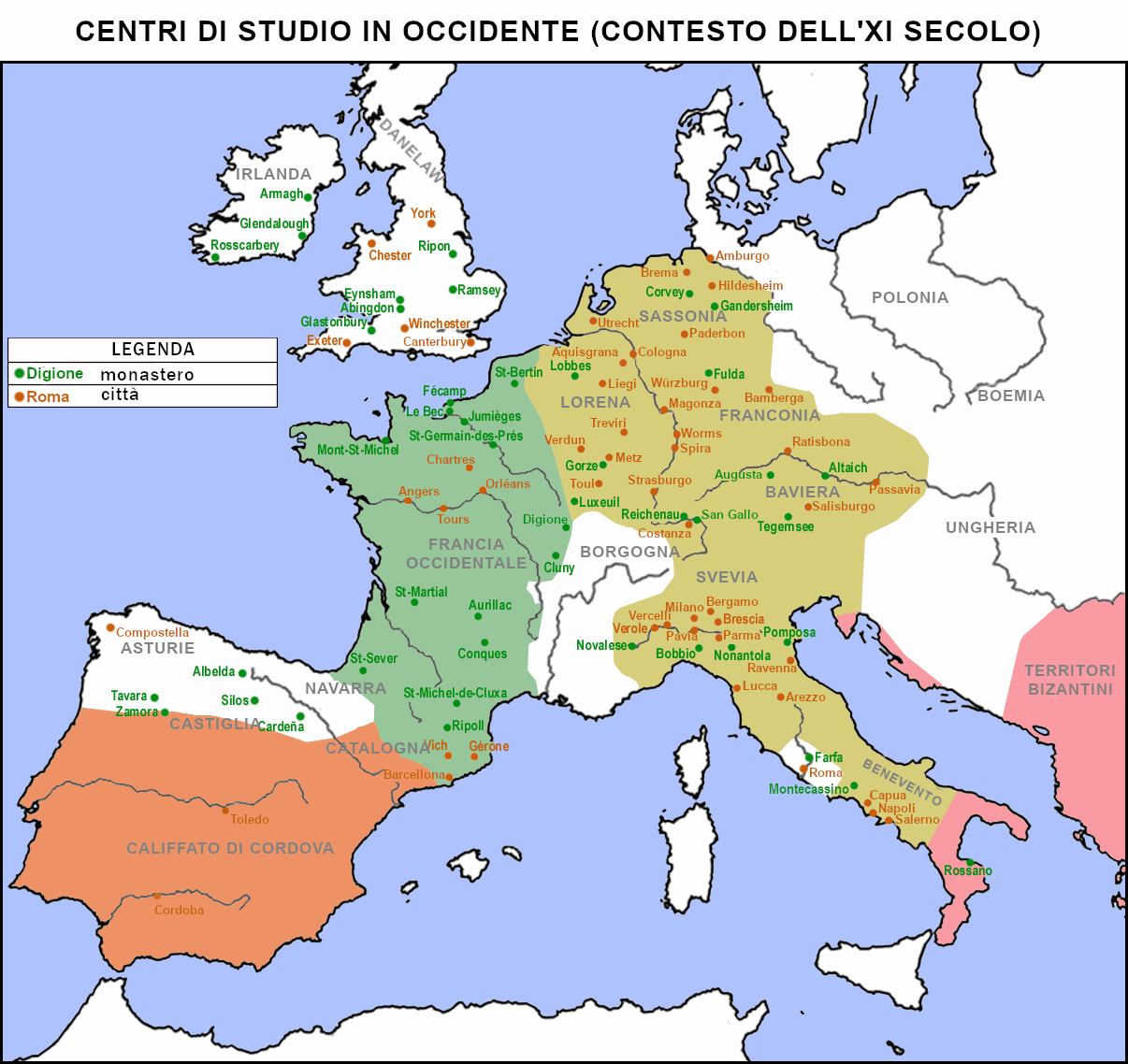
Centers of study in the mid-11th century: monastic schools in green, episcopal schools in orange.

One part of medieval historiography does not dispute the phenomenon of the renaissance of the 11th century, but it does question its abruptness and rather sees “a longer evolution which, beginning in the tenth century, confidently expands in the second half of the eleventh century. " In this case Gianfranco Maglio refers to the so-called "Ottonian Revival," also called "Renaissance" or "Ottonian Renaissance," linked to the name of Otto I of Saxony, a medieval period of cultural renewal of the Christian West, which is considered to have developed around the 10th century. It is an age characterized by undeniable cultural vitality, particularly through the activity of the schools, in Germany and to a lesser extent on the entire European continent.

Dominated by two major intellectual figures (Abbo of Fleury and Gerbert of Aurillac) it produced considerable artistic (illuminated manuscripts) and architectural activity. More limited than the Carolingian Renaissance that preceded it, and inseparable from it, the Ottonian Revival equally concluded the long development of teaching in the Middle Ages from the 6th to the 11th century, before the cultural flowering of the 12th century.

== The migratory drive ==
=== The Drang nach Osten ===
The 11th century also marks the beginning of the expansion that pushed the Germanic peoples with their heavy plows in search of new lands to cultivate in the east (Drang nach Osten).

"Germanic expansion eastward took the most diverse forms: at times peaceful valuation of uncultivated lands, at times the settlement of merchants or settlers through peacefully obtained privileges, at times violent action of conquest, often disguised behind religious pretexts. Monastic orders played a prominent part in it."

“The colonization of this northern plain was perhaps the main undertaking of the Germanic peoples during the Middle Ages [...] Nothing is more important in Germanic history than this immense and centuries-long migration, this mobile frontier of gallant country families steadily advancing eastward, cutting down forests, reclaiming land, draining swamps.”

The Slavic peoples retreated in the face of this massive wave of migration, abandoning the lands near the Elbe River and pushing as far as the Oder River. The monastic knightly orders of the Teutonic Knights and the Swordbrothers settled permanently in their territory in the 13th century.

=== The beginning of the Crusades and the settlement of Latin Christians in the Near East ===
Oh, race of Franks, race from across the mountains, race beloved and chosen by God, - as is clear from many of your works,- set apart from all other nations by the situation of your country as well as by your Catholic faith and the honor which you render to the holy Church: to you our discourse is addressed, and for you our exhortations are intended. We wish you to know what a grievous cause has led us to your country, for it is the imminent peril threatening you and all the faithful which has brought us hither. From the confines of Jerusalem and from the city of Constantinople a grievous report has gone forth and has -repeatedly been brought to our ears; namely, that a race from the kingdom of the Persians, an accursed race, a race wholly alienated from God, `a generation that set not their heart aright and whose spirit was not steadfast with God,' violently invaded the lands of those Christians and has depopulated them by pillage and fire. They have led away ap art of the captives into their own country, and a part have they have killed by cruel tortures. They have either destroyed the churches of God or appropriated them for the rites of their own religion. […] On whom, therefore, is the labor of avenging these wrongs and of recovering this territory incumbent, if not upon you, you upon whom, above all other nations, God has conferred remarkable glory in arms, great courage, bodily activity, and strength to humble the heads of those who resist you ? Let the deeds of your ancestors encourage you and incite your minds to manly achievements:-the greatness of King Charlemagne, and of his son Louis, and of your other monarchs, who have destroyed the kingdoms of the Turks and have extended the sway of Church over lands previously possessed by the pagan. Let the holy sepulcher of our Lord and Saviour, which is possessed by unclean nations, especially arouse you, and the holy places which are now treated, with ignominy and irreverently polluted with the filth of the unclean. […] Let none of your possessions retain you, nor solicitude for you, family affairs. For this land which you inhabit, shut in on all sides by the seas and surrounded by the mountain peaks, is too narrow for your large population;nor does it abound in wealth; and it furnishes scarcely food enough for its cultivators. Hence it is that you murder and devour one another, that you wage war, and that very many among you perish in intestine strife. Let hatred therefore depart from among you, let your quarrels end, let wars cease, and let all dissensions and controversies slumber. Enter upon the road to the Holy Sepulcher-, wrest that land from the wicked race, and subject it to yourselves. That land which, as the Scripture says, `floweth with milk and honey' was given by God into the power of the children of Israel. [...]

It would be these new expansive forces that would bring in a strong and warlike people from the North, of skilled sailors who would move from the Scandinavian peninsula and Jutland to the East and West and then settle in the land that would be called by them Normandy and in the fertile lands of Apulia and Sicily, which would make the Crusaders (called Franks by the Muslims of the Near East) dream of the lands and riches, which the pope promised along with the salvation of souls.

The Crusades were a kind of armed pilgrimage directed to help the “brothers of the East” in exchange for the return of the Eastern Church to the bosom of the Holy Roman Church, but also an outlet for the Christianity of young Europe swollen with violent energies that it turned against itself. “On only one condition could Christian peace be imposed on such a Europe, that is, that it be offered in return another war, or rather its only war.” in which the compressed energies of the Franks would find an outlet, who “ [...] accustomed to fighting iniquitously in private warfare against the faithful, [now] fight against the infidels.... Let those who have hitherto been brigands become soldiers."

The Christian West would be the one to establish itself commercially in the center of the Mediterranean Sea, with the Swabian naval and economic power (heir to the Norman Mediterranean strategy) and then the Italic maritime republics, which would play a fruitful mediating role with the Islamic world at the very time when the Fatimid Caliphate, which dominated Egypt, would work with the utmost of its economic and military might in Syria in order to annex it and then wrest from the "usurping" Abbasid Caliphate the political and spiritual leadership of the Ummah (ending up, however, in a deadlock in Syria itself). This facilitated the Seljuk Turks in no small measure in their efforts to "protect" Sunnism and the Abbasid Caliphate, bringing Baghdad under their control in 1071 and the regions that gravitated around the Persian Gulf and part of the Indian Ocean.

A problem arose for historians to distinguish between cause and effect among the elements that made up the revival of the West, but what is important is to point out its main manifestations.

“There is hardly an aspect of the life of men in the 11th-13th centuries to which a revolutionary character has not been attributed. More or less distinguished medievalists have thus spoken of agrarian revolution, feudal revolution, commercial revolution, industrial revolution, urban revolution, intellectual revolution," so much so that from the motionless Middle Ages there was a shift to a revolutionary one, and indeed "no one can deny that profound and even deep-rooted changes took place in the economic, social, political and mental structures of European society in those centuries."

== The transformation of society in Europe ==
=== The demographic upswing ===
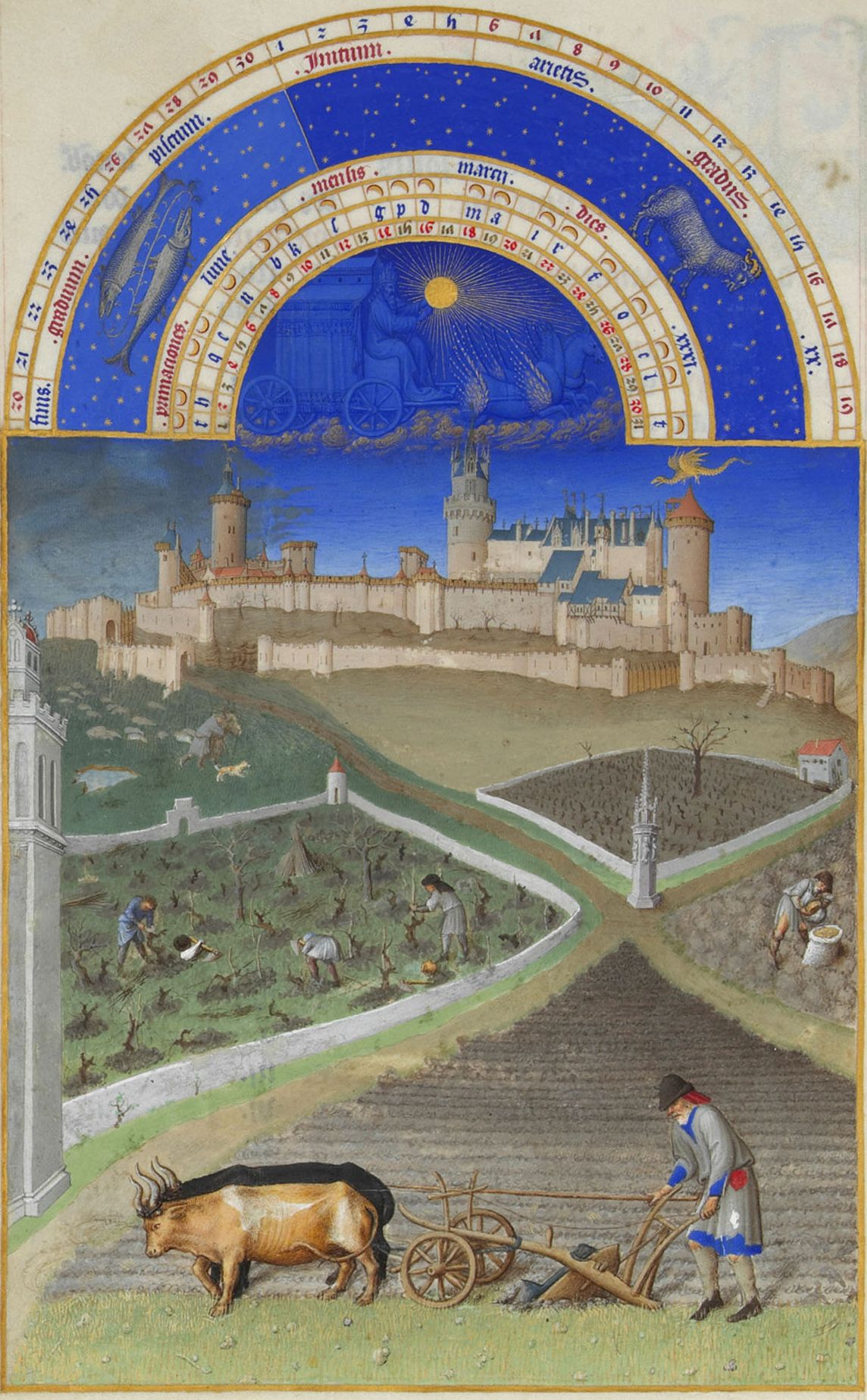
Miniature from Les Très Riches Heures du duc de Berry

The most striking aspect of this expansion of the West is, according to historians, the increase in population, which, however, cannot be calculated with certainty due to the absence of registry records but which is evident from a number of indirect evidences such as the increase in the extent of land put under cultivation. Between the 11th and 12th centuries there are documents testifying to the extensive clearing of virgin lands: this is evidenced by the contractual charters by which feudal lords granted advantageous opportunities for those who settled and cultivated uncultivated lands. Checkered or herringbone plans of cultivated land are found in the land registries. Further evidence is the increase in tithes the Church collected from peasants: the provost of Mantua Cathedral at the end of the 12th century noted that in less than a century the lands owned by the Church were “truncatae et aratae et de nemoribus et paludibus tractae et ad usum panis reductae.” (cleared and plowed, restored from the woods and swamps and reused to make bread).

Moreover, in recent years, historians have brought to light the importance of another factor that enabled this increase in population: the climatic factor. Between the 11th and 13th centuries there was a decrease in rainfall over the Old World, leading to a rise in temperatures. This change favored an increase in agricultural production and a decrease in the mortality rate as the population, better nourished, was more resistant to the diseases of the time.

As for the expansion of arable land, one usually thinks of the land taken from the forest, but the forest was a source of survival for the peasants, who found in it animals to hunt, wood for heating, acorns for their animals, often a stream where they could fish and supplement their poor diet: the forest is often as valuable as arable land. It is known from aerial photographs and pollen studies that the forest retreated in this period, but it was rather its edge that was eroded: the undergrowth, which offered less resistance to deforestation, often by fire or primitive means.

The less fertile lands, the cold lands, also came under cultivation. Genuine large-scale collective deforestations were carried out, the most notable of which was that carried out in the Netherlands by the "marsh farmers", the Flemish farmers who would make the "dike villages" rise from the sea. Around 1090, the Count of Flanders, Robert II, donated to the Abbey of Bourbourg the land wrested from the sea, and all that the monks were able to take from the sea (quicquid ibi accreverit per iactum maris).

This was the time when with gigantic efforts the Po Valley was reclaimed from the swamps and marshes and when the slopes of the Apennines were divided by the feudal lords into lots and assigned to those peasants who undertook to clear them of vegetation and cultivate them.

According to recent calculations this was the growth trend of a population marked by short life spans and high infant mortality but also by numerous births and formations of family groups characterized by young age: around 1050 the European population was estimated at 46 million, in 1100 it was 48 million, 50 around 1150 and 61 around 1200.

=== The agricultural revolution ===
Parts of a plough: 1. beam; 2. three-point hitch (hake); 3. height regulator; 4. coulter; 5. chisel; 6. share; 7. mouldboard

Agricultural development that had already begun in the Carolingian age was the cause and effect of the demographic revolution. The increase in the production of agricultural products is demonstrated not only by the quantity of land put under cultivation but also by the quality of agricultural practices that took advantage of technical advances. The first of these technological innovations was the use of the heavy wheeled and mouldboard plow, which allowed the land to be carved deeper than the more primitive wooden nail plow, which barely scratched the soil.

It has been said that the 11th century was the true "age of iron," which was increasingly used from the year 1000 onward, although still partially in tools, especially agricultural ones, that retained wooden handles. However, iron tools were very expensive, and even at the end of the 14th century a peasant living in the Bolognese mountains had to work four days to be able to afford one. Reminiscent of the use of iron is the spread in Anglo-Saxon countries of the surname Smith or Schmidt (blacksmith). It was this innovation that marked a reversal from the more developed Eastern civilization and set the stage for modern technological innovations.

This new type of plow, made of iron and heavier, made it possible to plow even cold and hard soils: since the furrow was deeper, it gave more protection and nourishment to the seeds, which took better root and produced more.

Along with the plow, a new way of attaching animals was adopted, improving the effectiveness of traction. Until then, the so-called breastplate had been used, a leather strap across the chest of the attached animals, which were almost suffocated by it. Later there was a switch to the collar (yoke), and the head yoke for the ox.

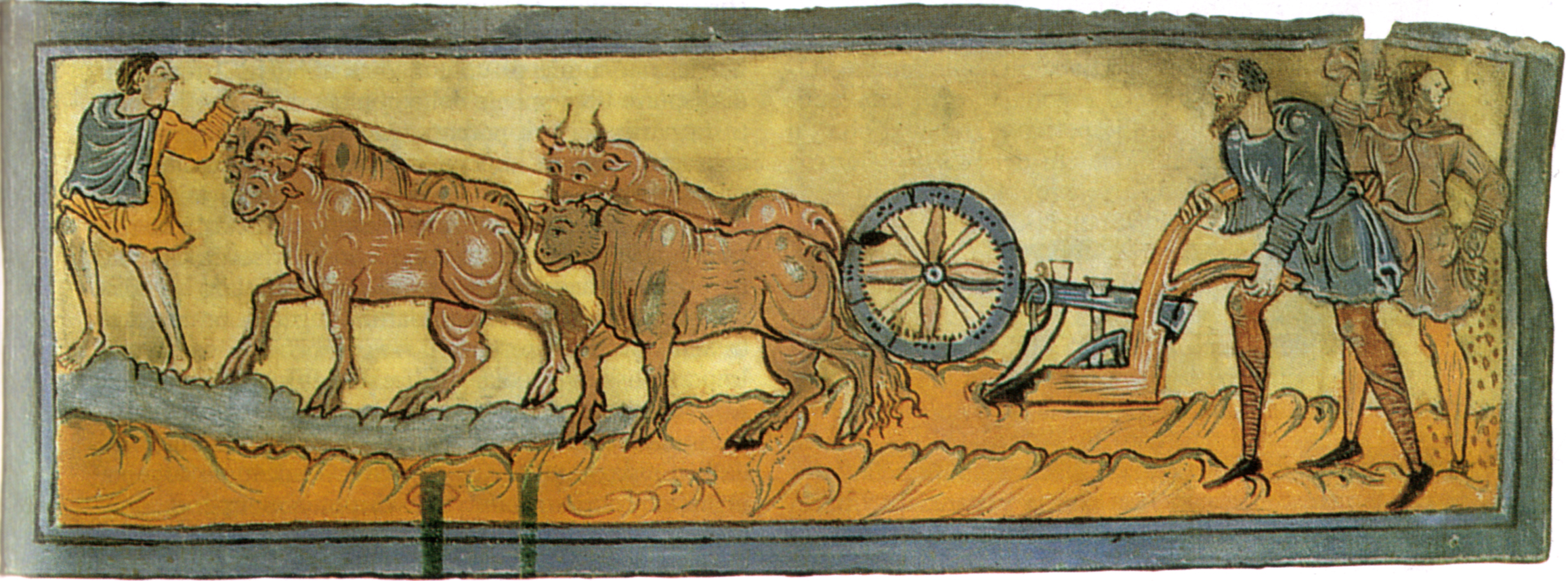
Calendar (the ploughing), c. 1000, miniature, Cotton ms. Tiberius B. V., f. 3r., London, British Library

The animals with their necks thus free, breathed freely, and the full force exerted by the collar or yoke putting pressure on their shoulders was used. It was calculated that traction in this way increased four to five times. The shoeing of the horse's hooves then made it possible to use this animal hitherto excluded for plowing because it was less powerful than the ox, giving it a more expeditious and sure-footed gait. Certainly the horse was less strong than the ox, but it was faster and, above all, less expensive, and moreover, over the years, it had been improved for war purposes. Hence its performance eventually proved to be fifty percent higher than that of oxen. The horse was more durable and could extend the work day by at least a couple of hours, when, for example, one had to take quick advantage of favorable weather conditions for plowing and planting. It also fed on oats, which were cultivated in a three-year rotation and also served the function of enriching the soil. For farmers who had their field far away, the horse was a convenient means of transportation that also allowed the formation of populous rural townships instead of small and remote villages, enabling a semi-urban lifestyle with the consequent social benefits.

Another major change in agriculture was the adoption of a form of three-year crop rotation that allowed for more intensive land use. In the absence of chemical fertilizers, fields in the past were left fallow after harvest so that they could recover nutrients: this was the part of the land that was not cultivated, called fallow, which covered roughly half of the arable field. The following year the opposite was done, implementing what is called biennial rotation. Later, the three-year rotation was introduced instead: the land was divided into three roughly equal parts and only one-third was left fallow: in this way production rose from roughly one-half to two-thirds of the possible output with an increase of one-sixth in production over the entire arable land and one-third over the two-year method. But this was not just a quantitative improvement: the quality of the crops also changed. One part of the land, in fact, was sown in the fall for winter crops (e.g., wheat and rye) the other was sown in the spring for oats, barley, or legumes for summer crops. Only a third of the field was left fallow, and in the following year crops were alternated. From this new method came a threefold advantage: with the oat crops one fed the beasts and the men; in case of famine in one season one could hope for the next season's other crop, but above all one obtained a variation in the diet and the introduction into it of legumes, which were essential for their protein supply.

The cereal-legume pair became normal to such an extent that the chronicler Orderico Vitale, speaking of the drought that struck Normandy and France in 1094, says that it destroyed segetes et legumina, crops and legumes.

— Le Goff (1988).

Then, during the 10th century, the balance had been broken between the lands that the lord administered directly by using the free labor services of serfs (pars dominica) and those leased to settlers, usually the most difficult to cultivate, (pars massaricia). Thus the ancient division of property into pars massaricia and pars dominica eventually vanished. The pars dominica was also divided into plots as the peasants reserved as much of their labor as possible for their fields, and the number of serfs obliged to work for the lord diminished more and more. The feudal economy ended and with it the way of thinking and feeling “though the usus did not lose their value. The old torturous settling into the patterns of oral custom is succeeded by an eagerness to record in writing, to set canons, to specify mutual positions. It is not only the redemption of lower classes. It is a new mentality making its way, both up and down."

=== The building revolution ===
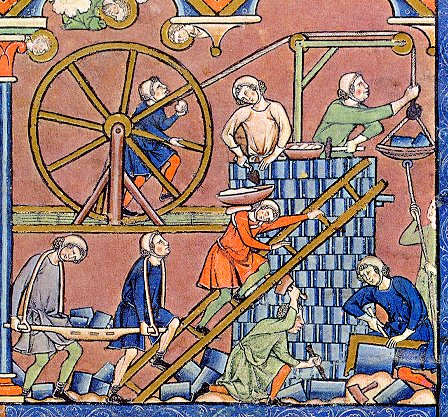
The new hoisting pulley

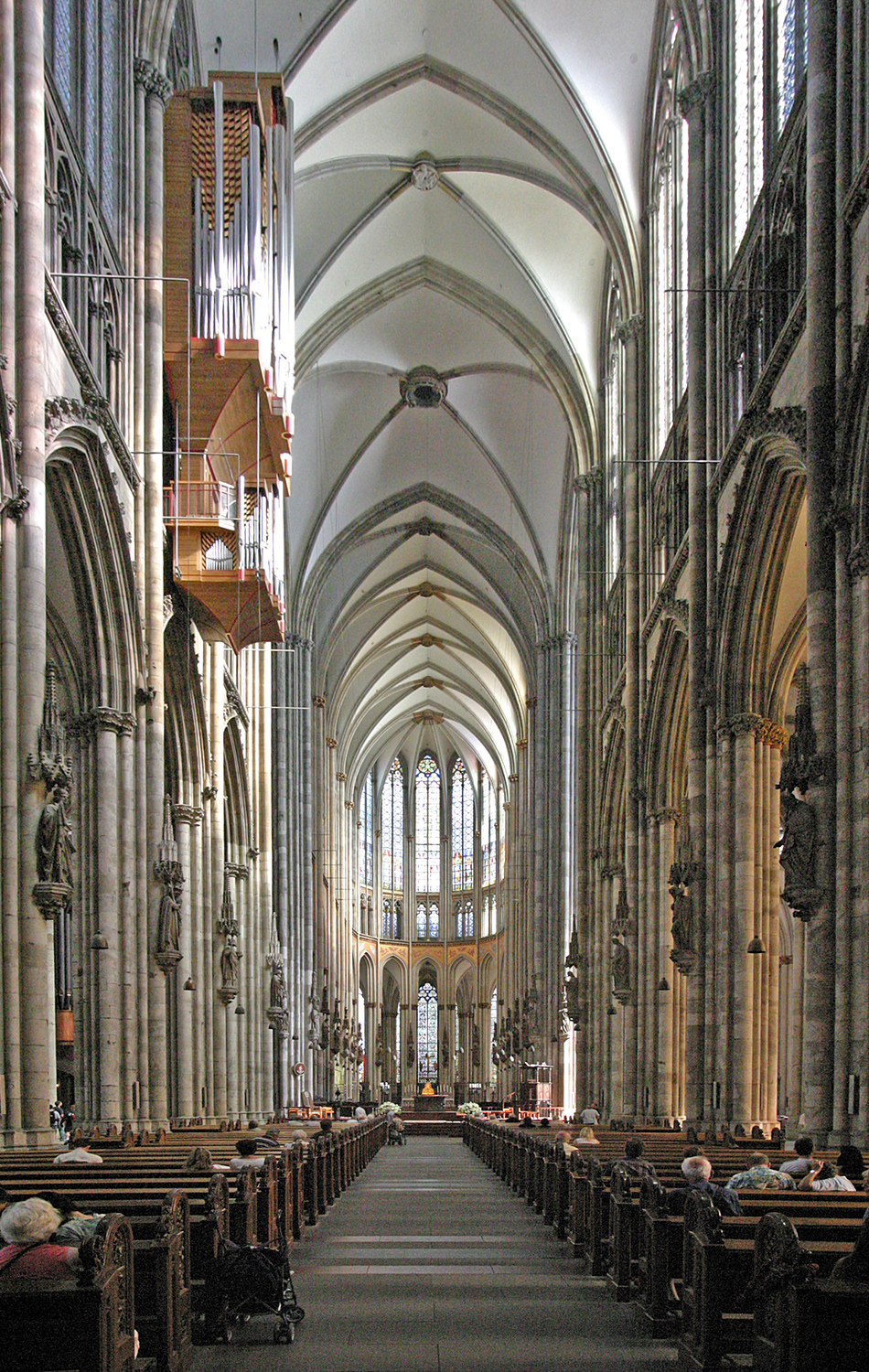
The new construction techniques applied to large cathedrals

Further exploitation of the pulling power of animals was achieved with the spread of the row hitch system, which combined, beginning in the first half of the 12th century, with the four-wheeled cart allowed the transport of large loads that were more stable and heavier than when the two-wheeled cart was used. Large blocks of stone and timbers could now be transported with which to build the great churches that, as one chronicler of the time put it, “are covering the surface of the world with a white mantle.” The cart and oxen are often found celebrated on the walls of cathedrals because it is to their toil that the erection of the great buildings is owed. To all this must be added the refinement of building machinery.

The cathedrals were the place to heal souls but also the place for the inhabitants to meet for their assemblies, where they could discuss indoor issues of public utility. Huge sums committing multiple successive generations of feudal lords were spent on the construction of these buildings that stand out from afar with their white bulk emerging from the small houses that surround them. They became a place of attraction and wonder and at the same time a place of increasingly intense and profitable secular trade for the lord and the townspeople who invested their money in the construction of the great churches. It was in the shadow of the cathedrals, usually surrounded by a large open space, that fairs were held where men exchanged goods, news and ideas.

The new spiritualism emanating from the Cluniac reform was also expressed in the new Romanesque style of the cathedrals, which are huge, strong and massive like castles. They are in fact the expression of the power and wealth of the Church, more than to welcome the faithful they were made to make everyone understand the glory of God. And the masses were actually astonished at the grandeur of the buildings but did not understand the language of Romanesque art used as a propaganda tool. The faithful in their naiveté could not understand the hermetic symbolism represented on the walls of the cathedral and the pictorial sophistication of the sacred scenes depicted.

Things changed in the mid-11th century when with the revival of the economy and the spiritual reform of Cluny greater freedom in the Romanesque style appeared, an indication of a change that in the permanence of a sacred representation tended to become more popular anticipating Gothic architecture. Verticality was emphasized and now the faithful understood the symbol of the tension toward God and the sense of detachment from earthly things.

=== Innovations in manufacturing ===
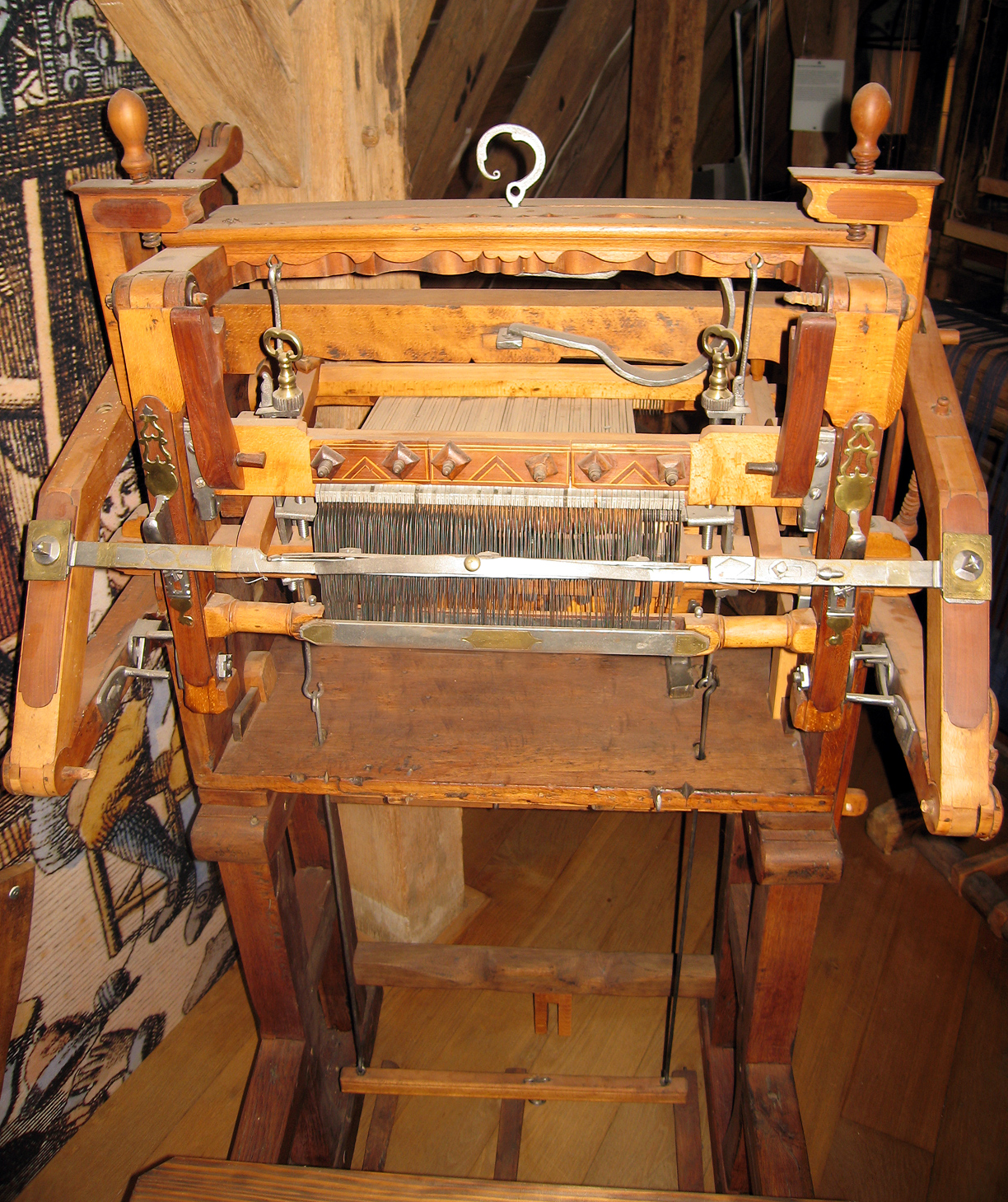
Pedal loom

In the 11th century, a new machine, the pedal loom, began to be used and was important in the development of medieval industry and the widespread production of textiles. It is not known who first introduced this simple device, which added a pedal to the existing hand loom to reduce weaver fatigue and speed up weaving. Pedal looms spread from Flanders to the Byzantine Empire. The number of weavers was small, but they would gradually become the first nuclei of the industrial revolution to come. Then came the cumulative effect typical of technological innovation: the speeding up of weaving was reflected in the speeding up of spinning with the use of the treadle wheel; thus even humbler figures than weavers began to be considered: spinners.

At the same time, another new machine became popular: the water mill. It had been known since the Hellenistic period, but had not been fully exploited. Now the conditions for its intensive and convenient use were created. Human labor became less and less important, and slavery proved to be no longer convenient. The cost of servants and animals to turn the millstones was too high, and the miller had to rely on an abundant and continuous supply of grain. This was at a time when in the West slaves became serfs and the free and unfree men of a village were forced to have their grain ground in the lord's mill. In 11th-century England, there were about five thousand mills, nearly one for every four hundred people.

As the need for new products arose, the water mill was extended to a wide variety of manufacturing activities, such as the fulling of cloth in dye houses and tanneries, and the operation of bellows in forges and saws in sawmills. However, no thought was given to its application to weaving and spinning, since the work of these humble artisans was so poorly paid and their labor so little valued that it was not considered worthwhile to use a pedal loom.

=== The new extension of trades ===
Since the second half of the ninth century a new class appeared - that of the negotiantes, the merchants, who, together with that of the artisans, joined those of the feudal aristocrats, clergy, free settlers, and serfs. As the population increased, old Roman cities, which had never quite fallen into decay, were reborn to new life and new ones sprang up. Under their walls and within them markets were held and those coins that in the past were hoarded and hidden once again circulated.

“It has been seen that already in the last days of the Lombard monarchy are mentioned in the edict of Aistulf (750-754 A.D.) the negotiantes as a distinct social class, divided into three grades, of which the highest is placed on a par with the middle landowners. Doubt remains whether by that term is meant, according to Roman precedent, businessmen who were preferably engaged in credit business, or instead merchants by profession."

Since in the age of Aistulf the cities were mostly depopulated, it seems logical to think that the term negotiantes referred not to credit traders but precisely to wandering merchants. It is especially in the 11th century, however, that concessions to open markets within cities or under their walls are found. Merchants found goods to sell in artisan production but not only.

"Goods were distinguished into "coarse" and "fine," and on the basis of this designation it was long believed that rich articles constituted the backbone of international trade in that they were not bulky and were easily transported over great distances without considerable expense, and because of their high value, even when handled in small lots, they yielded high earnings (e.g., pearls and precious stones, perfumes, spices for cooking [. ...]) On the other hand, by land and sea routes, cargoes of poor or otherwise heavy goods largely circulated...."

Foodstuffs such as salt, grain, and wine, required by countries that lacked them due to famine or war, or urgently needed materials such as lumber. In the age of the pedal loom, naturally wool, cotton and textiles and the indispensable element for degreasing fibers and fixing the color of cloth were trafficked: alum.

=== The Reformation of Latin Christianity ===
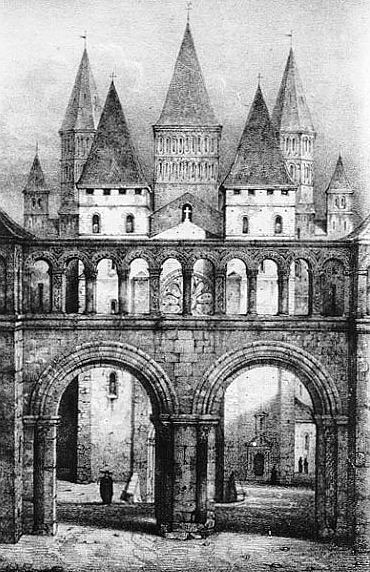
The Abbey of Cluny

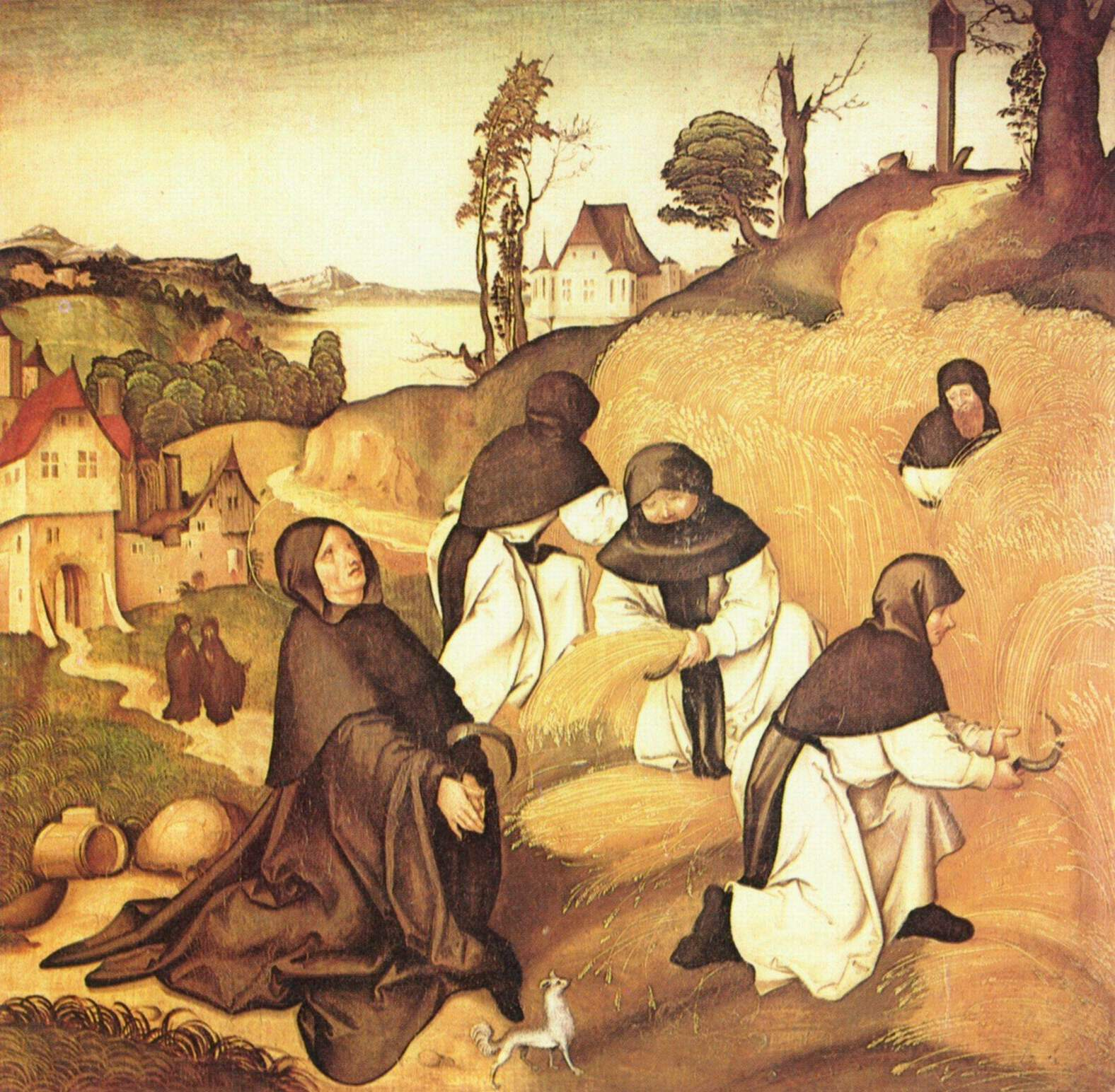
The Benedictine rule of “Ora et Labora” (Pray and work).

The feudal nobles remained deeply superstitious, and when the fear of eternal damnation arose they sought to save their souls with the prayers of monks at their disposal. Thus the Duke of Aquitaine William the Pious, after pillaging monasteries everywhere donated one of his hunting pavilions at Cluny in Burgundy to some Benedictine monks in 910. The resulting monastery should have been subject only to the authority of the pope, who, however, was far away, and with his power in crisis over the investiture struggle with the emperor.

“In a world wracked with disorder a Benedictine area was again being created that enjoyed spiritual freedom, this time zealously protected against both the nobles in perpetual conflict and the no less greedy bishops of the vicinity."

The monastery was an island of peace not only for its benefactor lords but for anyone who asked for hospitality and shelter. A kind of religious tourism flocked to the cloisters where precious relics of saints were venerated. The monasteries thus grew in size and number. After a century more than a thousand new monasteries had sprung up and all were subject to the abbot of Cluny as if there had been a single monastery headed by the abbot, the true head of a kind of Cluniac state born of the spiritual freedom and political power of monks who were often the advisers of princes. Numerous other monasteries sprang up from Cluny especially in France and Italy where the initial spirit of spiritual freedom was accentuated until it became a kind of anarchy with an almost wild lifestyle led in solitude. It was no longer believed that community life could truly bring one closer to God, subject as it was to the powerful. Thus was born the Eastern-style anchoretism, in the West where hermits considered themselves freed from all bonds of obedience both to the monastery and to any feudal institution rejecting all forms of organized spiritual life.

The desire for an absolutely free spiritual life transferred from the monks to the laity initiating the spread of the heresies of those who, not trusting the prayers of monks compromised with the temporal power, sought the salvation of their souls on their own. With the typical medieval way of being incapable of moderation of feelings and passions, with abandonment to the extremes of excessive and immoderate behavior, the desire for redemption also took on these characteristics. In 1028 the archbishop of Milan had thirty noblewomen from Monforte d'Alba arrested who were leading ascetic lives under the leadership of the Countess of Monforte. “Virginity was their ideal, they did not eat meat, shared every possession among themselves, prayed and observed fasting day and night. They mortified meat in atonement for sins, and when natural death approached, more than one had her companions kill her in order to be freed from the hated body.... After their arrest they gave proof of extreme firmness: placed between a large wooden cross and a stake, they mostly preferred to throw themselves into the flames, their hands pressed to their eyes."

Such radical behavior could not find much of a following and in fact already by 1051 all trace of it was lost, though not because the heresies were over but because finally with the Gregorian reform of the Church even the laity, previously mere spectators, were included in the reform initiated by the monasteries.

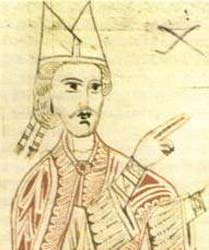
Hildebrand of Sovana, Pope Gregory VII

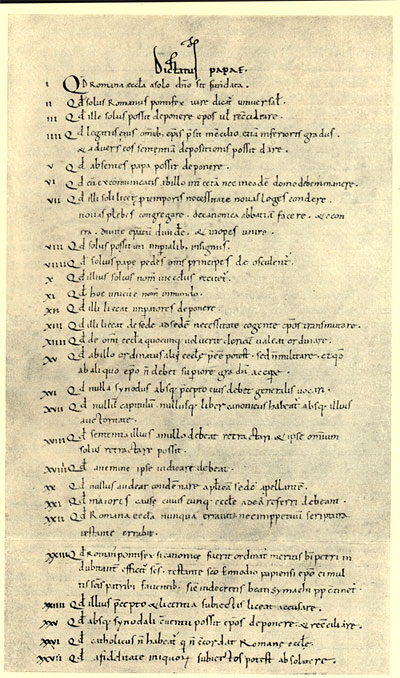
Dictatus Papae, Vatican Archives

The empire had been increasingly losing power in the face of the onslaught of great vassals, but now the emperors of Saxony decided it was time to make their authority effective and took to conferring fiefdoms and ecclesiastical appointments together, thus creating the new feudal figure of the bishop-count. In this way they secured the loyalty of the new vassals and together the return to their own hands of the lands granted in feudal possession. The Households of Saxony and Franconia took to appoint bishops regardless of their religious dignity as long as their loyalty and willingness to leave the crosier for the sword was secure. Basically, the German emperors imitated those feudal lords who had long since in Germany, with the establishment of “private churches,” taken to confer in donation or benefice the lands intended for the construction of monasteries, churches or abbeys and to appoint themselves, whether religious or lay, the abbots or archbishops who had to assure them in prayers for the salvation of their souls the successful completion of the donation or grant of the fiefdom.

Thus simony and concubinage, the evils of the “iron age” of the Church, spread among the clergy. The protest of the faithful over unworthy clergy was thus taken up by the reformers of Cluny, pandered to by the German popes, with the support of the emperors themselves, who did not realize that such a reformed Church would claim not only its absolute autonomy vis-à-vis the empire but indeed primacy over the empire itself. As indeed happened with the great synod or council of bishops, the Lateran Synod of 1059, inspired by the Cluniac monk Hildebrand of Sovana, adviser to Pope Nicholas II. The synod forbade anyone from receiving ecclesiastical offices from the hands of laymen, even those of the emperor, and again condemned all forms of simony and concubinage. It also established new rules for the election of the pope by entrusting it to a college of bishops from the major dioceses, called cardinals, since they were the cardinals of the Church, reaffirming the illegitimacy of imperial appointments of popes. Thus began the long conflict between the Empire and the Church, a war that even saw an assassination attempt made by an imperial partisan on the life of the promoter of the spiritual and political renewal of the Church: Hildebrand of Sovana, who became Pope Gregory VII. The pontiff, with the "Dictatus papae" (1075,) an act of supremacy over imperial power, initiated the "struggle for investiture" that eventually saw the prestige of the universal institutions, the papacy and the empire, that had been the political and religious points of reference for the people of the Middle Ages, succumb.

== See also ==
- Middle Ages
- Late Middle Ages
- Medieval Warm Period
- Medieval commune
- Carolingian Renaissance
- Ottonian Renaissance
- Renaissance of the 12th century
- Northumbria's Golden Age
- Golden Age of medieval Bulgarian culture
- Macedonian Renaissance
- Palaeologan Renaissance

== Bibliography ==
- Borst, Arno (1968). "Monumenti religiosi e spirituali nell'Alto Medioevo" [Religious and spiritual monuments in the early Middle Ages]. I Propilei (in Italian). Milano.
- Cherubini, Giovanni (1972). Agricoltura e società rurale nel Medioevo [Agriculture and rural society in the Middle Ages] (in Italian). Firenze: Sansoni.
- Cipolla, Carlo (1976). Storia economica dell'Europa pre-industriale [Economic history of pre-industrial Europe] (in Italian). Torino: Il Mulino. ISBN 978-88-15-02670-5.
- Falco, Giorgio (1977). La polemica sul medioevo [The controversy over the Middle Ages] (in Italian). Napoli.
- Fisher, Herbert Albert Laurens (1971). Storia d'Europa [History of Europe] (in Italian). Bari: Laterza.
- Le Goff, Jacques (1988). Il basso medioevo [The late Middle Ages] (in Italian). Milano: Feltrinelli. ISBN 978-88-07-77011-1.
- Le Goff, Jacques (1969). La civiltà dell'Occidente medioevale [The civilization of the medieval West] (in Italian). Torino: Einaudi. 9788806217914.
- Luzzatto, Gino (1967). Breve storia economica dell'Italia medievale [Brief economic history of medieval Italy] (in Italian). Torino: Sansoni.
- Maglio, Gianfranco (2006). L'idea costituzionale nel Medioevo [The constitutional idea in the Middle Ages] (in Italian). Il Segno Gabrielli Editori.
- Merlo, Giovanni G. (1989). "Basso Medioevo" [Late Middle Ages]. Medioevo (in Italian). Bologna.
- Morghen, Raffaello (1942). Gregorio VII [Gregory VII] (in Italian). Torino.
- Sapori, Armando (1972). La mercatura medievale [The medieval commerce] (in Italian). Firenze: Sansoni.
