= Northumbria's Golden Age =

Period of history in Northumbria, England

The Northumbrian Renaissance or Northumbria's Golden Age is the name given to a period of cultural flowering in the kingdom of Northumbria, broadly speaking from the mid-seventh to the mid-eighth centuries. It is characterised by a blend of insular art, Germanic art and Mediterranean influence. Authors associated with this golden age include Bede and Alcuin; artefacts include the Lindisfarne Gospels and associated manuscripts, the Ruthwell Cross and associated sculptures, and, arguably, the Franks Casket. An illustration of the cultural activity of Northumbria during this period is given by Alcuin's De Sanctis et Pontificibus Ecclesiæ Eboracensis, which gives particular attention to Bishop Æthelbert of York.

Through Alcuin's sharing of intellectual works in the Frankish kingdom, the Northumbrian Renaissance came to influence the culture of the Carolingian Renaissance.

== See also ==
- Carolingian Renaissance
- Ottonian Renaissance
- Renaissance of the 11th century
- Renaissance of the 12th century
- Golden Age of Bulgaria
- Macedonian Renaissance
- Palaeologan Renaissance
- History of Northumberland
- Timeline of Northumbria and Northumberland
