= Palaeologan Renaissance =

Final stylistic period of Byzantine art

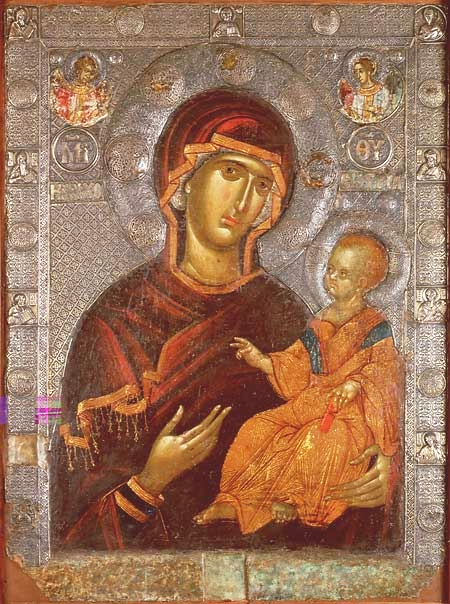
Icon with metal background. Constantinople, 14th century. Located in Ohrid, North Macedonia.

The Palaeologan Renaissance or Palaiologan Renaissance is the final period in the development of Byzantine art. Coinciding with the reign of the Palaiologoi, the last dynasty to rule the Byzantine Empire (1261–1453), it was an attempt to restore Byzantine self-confidence and cultural prestige after the empire had endured a long period of foreign occupation. The legacy of this era is observable both in Greek culture after the empire's fall and in the Italian Renaissance. Scholars of the time utilized several classical texts.

== History ==
Following the Sack of Constantinople in 1204, the Crusaders established a Latin Empire to rule what had been Byzantine territory. Extensive looting took place in the fallen capital, and many relics and art treasures were shipped back to Western Europe. Seeking refuge in unconquered remnants of their empire, the Byzantine elite formed governments-in-exile at Nicaea, Trebizond, and Epirus. These new political entities continued to commission works of art, which however bore marks of limited resources and fragmented imperial authority. Craftsmen worked with less rare and expensive materials than before— an example is the use of steatite in sculptures that would formerly have been made of ivory— and sponsorship came from a multitude of private patrons instead of being dominated by the emperor. One of the emperors of Nicaea, John III Doukas Vatatzes (r. 1222–1254), undertook projects to ensure the survival of traditional culture. He commissioned public libraries in all the cities of his possessions and ordered municipal leaders to allocate salaries to scholars of medicine, mathematics and rhetoric. In 1238, he also instituted a school of philosophy directed by Nikephoros Blemmydes.

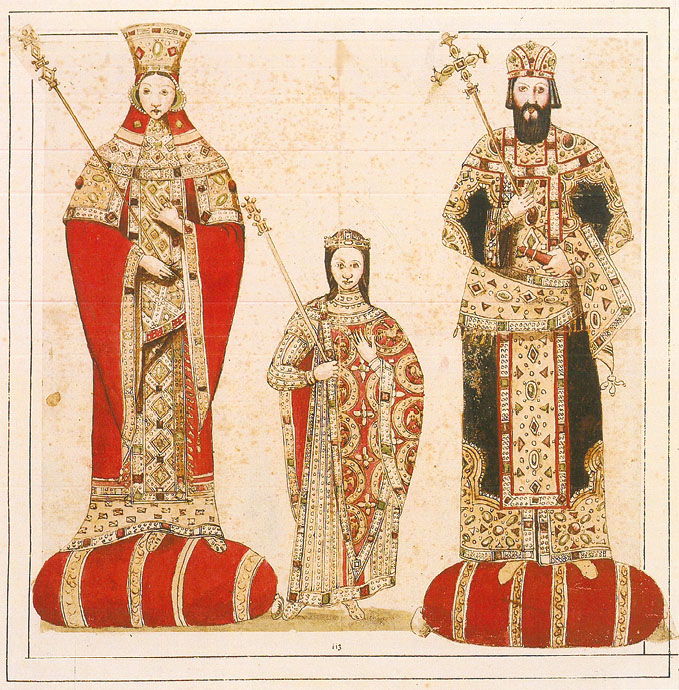
Reproduction of manuscript depicting Michael VIII Palaiologos, founder of the Palaeologan dynasty, with his wife and son

Constantinople was recaptured in 1261 by Michael VIII Palaiologos (r. 1261–1282), founder of the Palaeologan Dynasty and former co-emperor of Nicaea. Amid triumphal ceremonies, he declared the Byzantine Empire restored and instituted a campaign of renovation in the capital. Made necessary by the damage done to the city under Latin rule, the renovation was also intended to symbolize the empire's recovery from the destitution and humiliation it had just undergone. The conception of the Palaeologan period as a cultural "renaissance" owes much to Michael's efforts to revive the glory of Constantinople; in Byzantine lands unconquered by the Crusaders, art production had never been so seriously disrupted as to require a period of "rebirth".

Certain conditions established by the sack persisted after the recovery of Constantinople. The imperial boundaries had been permanently diminished, and the rulers of Trebizond and Epirus remained independent of the central government. In the aftermath of the Crusades there was unprecedentedly close contact between the Greek world and Western Europe, and Byzantine and Western artists borrowed each other's techniques. Fluency in multiple styles was useful for catering to a more diverse group of patrons, but these borrowings were also motivated by interest in foreign artworks and a desire to learn from them. As in the era of exile, much Palaeologan art was funded by the aristocracy instead of the emperors. Pictorial works from this era feature an unprecedented number of non–imperial donor portraits. The Palaeologan period was also the first in which Byzantine painters regularly signed their works; it is not clear why this custom developed, since innovation and stylistic individuality continued to be discouraged in Orthodox art.

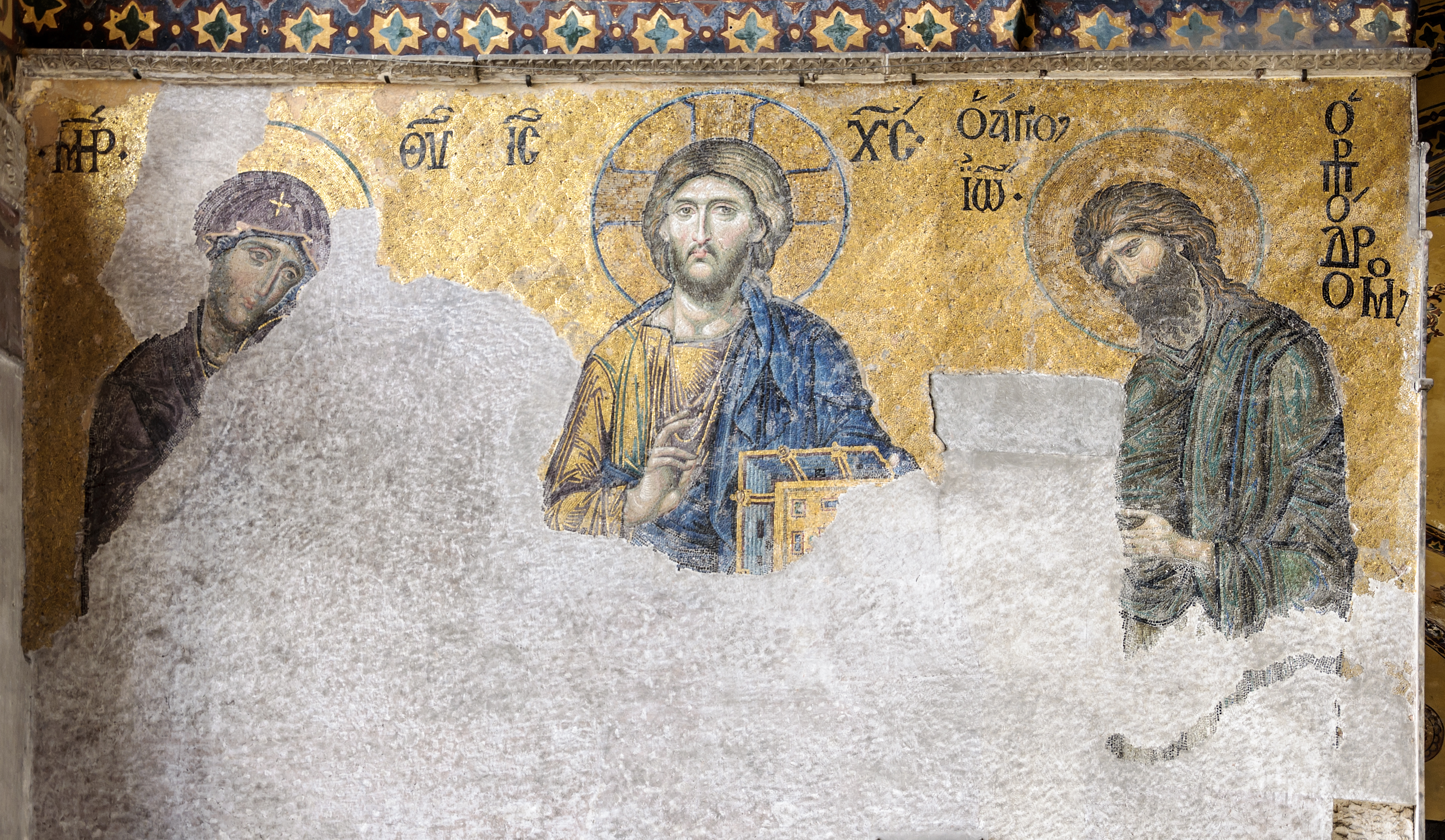
Deesis mosaic, from Hagia Sophia.

Michael VIII ordered work in Hagia Sophia, which had been converted to a place of Catholic worship by the Latin emperors. The church was re-furnished for the performance of Orthodox rites, and a colossal mosaic of the Deesis, 5.2 meters in length and 6 meters wide, was installed in its south gallery. Among the other objects of Michael's patronage were the Blachernae Palace and several sections of the city defenses, along with public service projects. Private patrons sponsored restorations of Constantinople's churches, many of which were maintained for the next two centuries even as the residential portions of the city fell into neglect.

Between 1316 and 1321, Theodore Metochites, deputy of Michael's successor Andronikos II, sponsored an extensive rebuilding of the Chora Church. An artist, whose name is not preserved, was called away from a project in Thessaloniki to design Chora's frescos and mosaics, which emerged as one of the foremost achievements of Palaeologan art. David Talbot Rice points out that, contemporaneously, "Giotto was decorating the Arena Chapel at Padua. The Byzantine painter [working in Chora] had other ideas and a different outlook, but in his own way he was just as great a genius". Andronikos II had Hagia Sophia's walls reinforced with buttresses in 1317. Late in his reign there was a decline in the empire's fortunes, and little building was undertaken in the capital after 1330. The optimism fostered by Michael VIII gave way in subsequent times to a sense that "the present generation had sinned and was inferior to its predecessors".

In 1346 an earthquake damaged the domes of Hagia Sophia, which were repaired by Andronikos III. Manuel II (r. 1391–1425) created an institution called the Katholikon Mouseion in the early 15th century. It was located in a hospital and attached to the monastery of St. John Prodrome, whose rich library had at its disposal numerous teachers including Georges Chrysococè and Cardinal Bessarion, who later settled in Italy. The library welcomed many Italians who came to Constantinople to learn Greek language and culture. Also during the reign of Manuel II, the scholar Demetrios Kydones wrote several texts such as the Discourses and Dialogues on the relationship between Christianity and Islam, on politics and on civil subjects such as marriage and education. He also made a treatise on the seven ecumenical councils, a poem on how to convert unbelievers, and a refutation of Catholic doctrine on the procession of the Holy Spirit.

=== Notable contributors ===
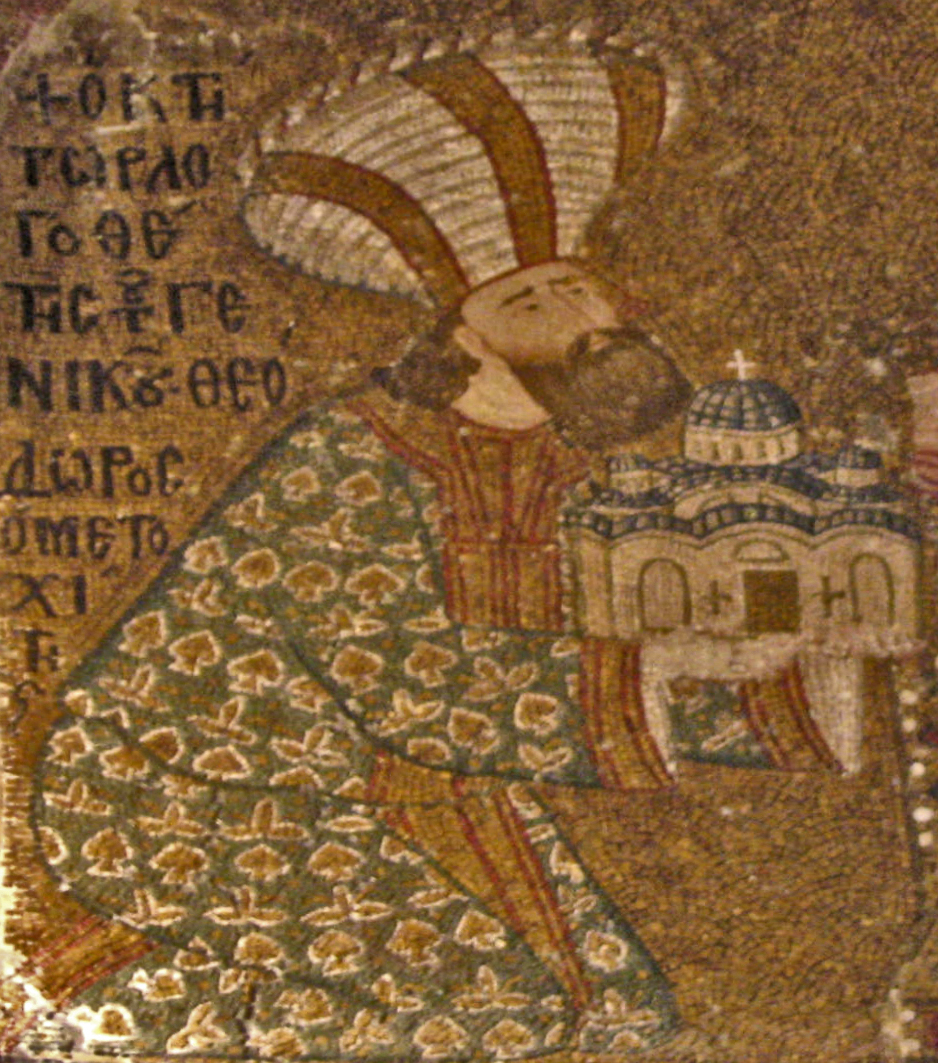
Theodore Metochites, one of many notable contributors to the cultural and literary revival of the Palaeologan Renaissance.

Under the impetus of the Palaeologan emperors, many politicians, scholars and writers took part in projects of literary revival and the expansion of knowledge. Among these were the judge and historian George Pachymeres (1242 – c. 1310), and four great philological scholars of the time of Andronikos II: Thomas Magistros, Demetrius Triclinios, Manuel Moschopoulos, and the theologian Maximus Planudes (c. 1255/1260 – c. 1305/1310). The scholar and statesman Nikephoros Choumnos (c. 1250/1255 – 1327) was one of the most important figures of the renaissance, while Theodore Metochites (1270–1332) was a philosopher and a patron of the arts and sciences, considered the most complete scholar of his time. He studied Classical antiquity, although not with the same intense interest as his contemporaries in Trecento Italy. The fourteenth-century poet Manuel Philes wrote pieces commemorating a wide variety of artworks and the aristocrats who had sponsored them. His work gives some insight into the creative activity of his time and place, although it is also full of "clichés or the praises and lineage of his noble patrons". A tradition of polemic also existed during the time, exemplified by the historian Nikephoros Gregoras, who expanded the criticism of Aristotle in his dialogue Phlorentius. Gemistos Plethon was exiled by Manuel II to the Despotate of Morea, an important intellectual center; his lectures there revived Platonic thought in Western Europe. Plethon had offended the emperor by studying heretical and even pagan doctrines, and thus displaying an openness of mind "very similar to Renaissance humanism".

== Art and architecture ==
=== The Palaeologan style ===
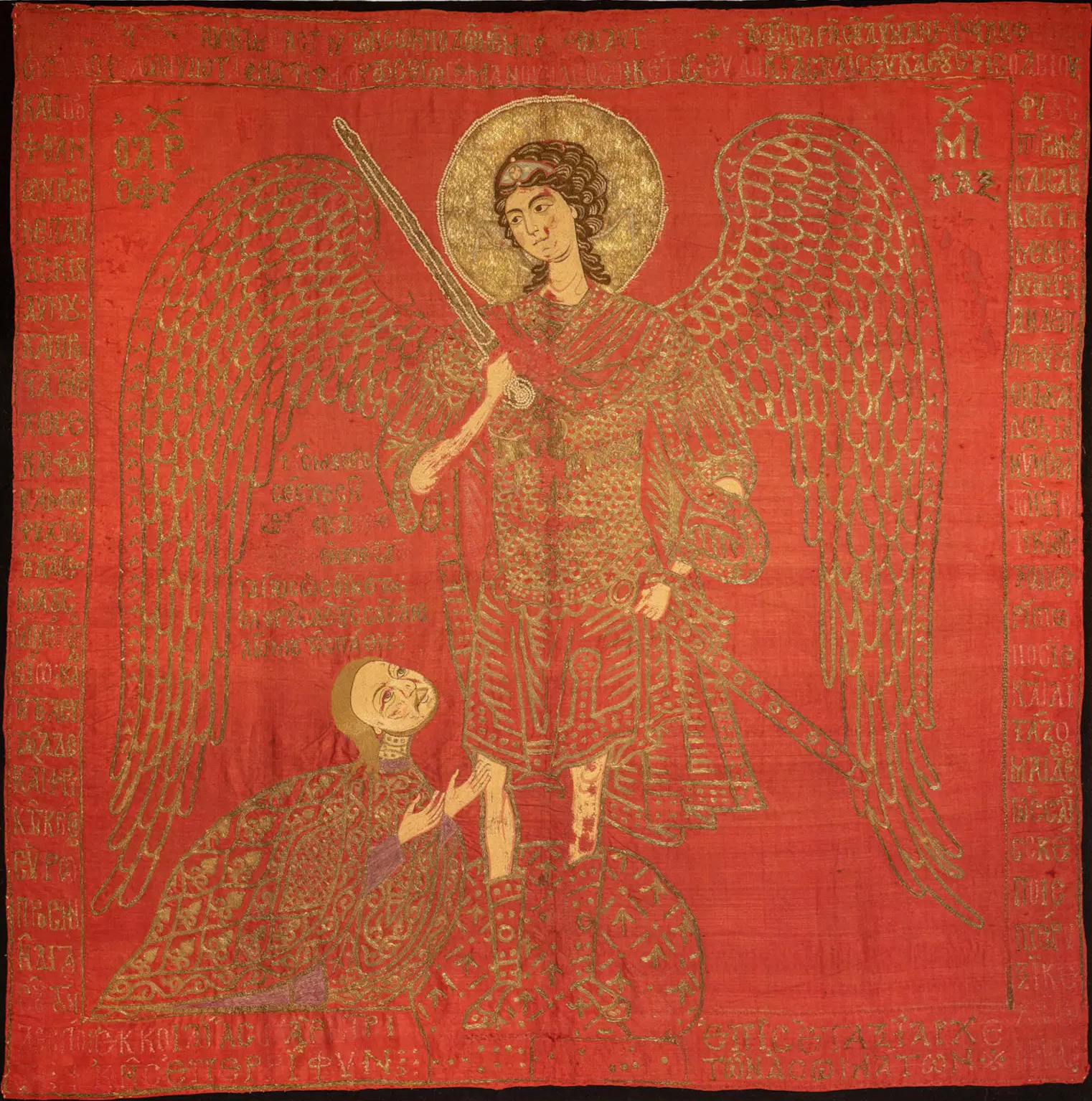
Silk podea from the 14th or early 15th century, Urbino museum

Cyril Mango describes "a distinctive new style" in Palaeologan painting, "marked by a multiplication of figures and scenes, by a new interest in perspective (however strangely rendered), and by a return to much earlier models such as illuminated manuscripts of the 10th century". These mannerisms appear with equal frequency in works of all sizes. Contemporary trends in church painting favored intricate narrative cycles, both in fresco and in sequences of icons; to serve this need, the traditional large, portrait-style holy images were partially superseded by landscape scenes with comparatively small figures, often depicted in motion. The landscapes themselves are barren, perhaps intended to invoke the wilderness traditionally occupied by prophets and ascetic hermits. There are informal attempts at using foreshortening to create the illusion of three dimensions, notably in the curious buildings which sometimes form a backdrop for figures. The scholar Lyn Rodley refers to "lurching architectural forms that suggest distant, and none too committed, reference to the formulae of perspective drawing". In the mosaics and frescos of Chora Church, as well as certain other works from Constantinople, foreshortening is used for narrative purposes, making buildings lean toward the intended focus of the viewer's attention.

In depicting people, Palaeologan artists favored a "small-headed, wide-bodied, 'boneless' figure style". Kurt Weitzmann speaks of "over-elongated figures", placed in "swaying poses" and wearing draperies which "bulge slightly, giving the impression of detachment from the frail bodies underneath". Hard, geometrically patterned highlights are used to give figures the appearance of volume, albeit without interest in depicting realistic anatomical construction or a coherent light source. This technique was extensively employed by Cretan School artists and thus became a standard in post-Byzantine icon painting.

=== Icons ===
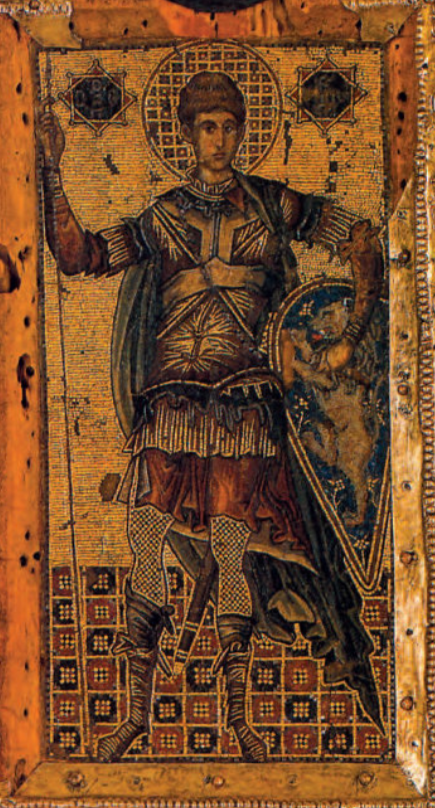
Micromosaic icon of St. Demetrius, 14th century. Now in Sassoferrato museum

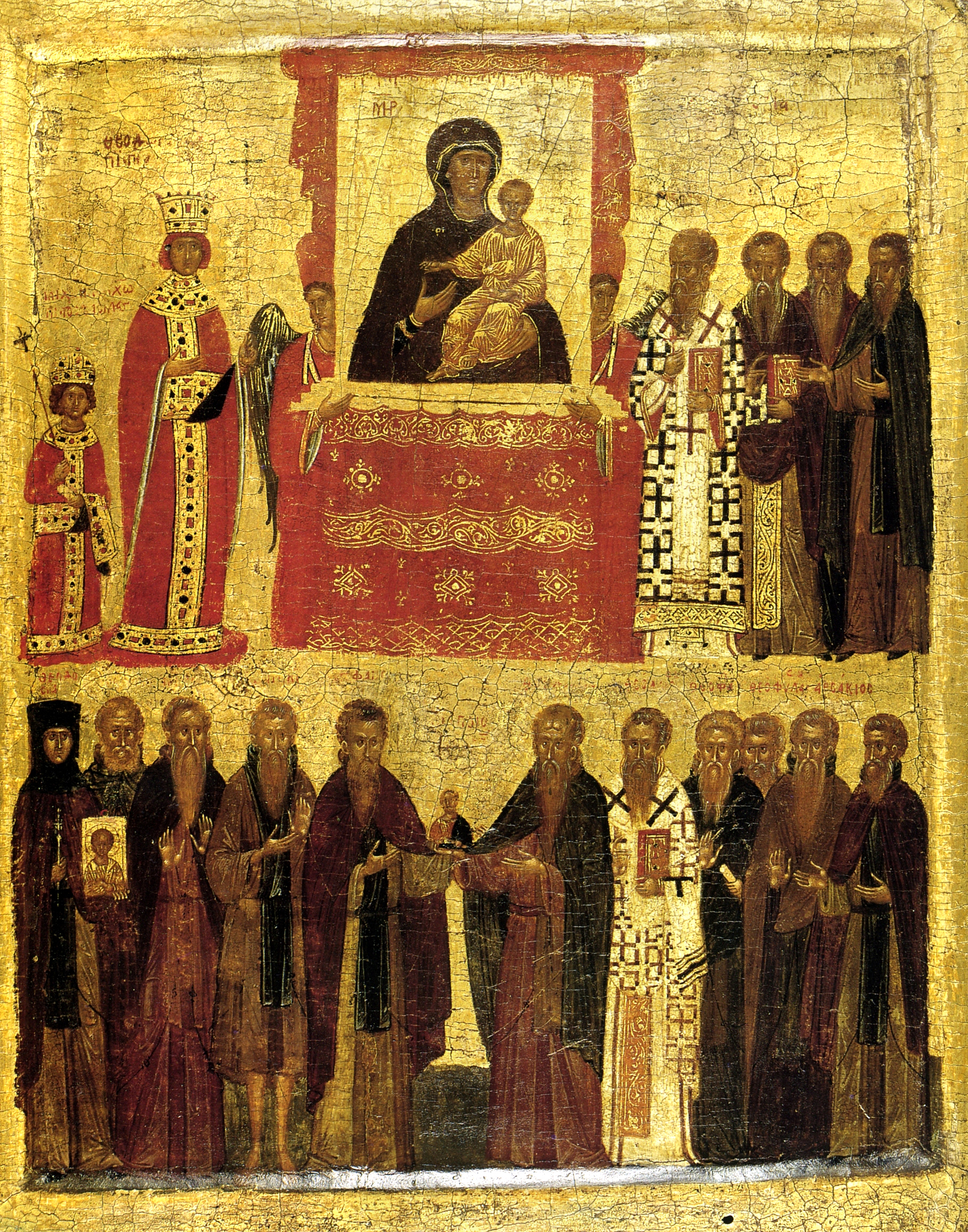
Icon of the Triumph of Orthodoxy, c. 1400

Tempera paintings on wooden panels had always made up part of the corpus of Byzantine icons, but they proliferated in the Palaeologan period; the word "icon", formerly used to describe any image employed in a religious context, became increasingly associated with this kind of panel painting. The phenomenon was probably linked to new customs related to the templon, a screen used in churches to separate the congregation from the sanctuary where priests conducted rituals. The practice of affixing icons to this screen dated back to at least the 8th century. As part of a general increase of paintings in late Byzantine church interiors, more panels were added and the templon evolved into the iconostasis, "a solid wall of icons... between the worshipper and the mystery of the Christian service". By the 12th century, usage in this important and highly visible context had made panel paintings into a more prestigious art form, suitable for wealthy patrons to commission. Even quite large icons, 1.2 to 1.8-meters high or more and depicting figures greater than life size, began to be executed in tempera, rather than in the traditional media of fresco or mosaic.

Small icons were also made in quantity, most often as private devotional objects personalized with dedicatory inscriptions or donor portraits. They were the late Byzantine art form most likely to partake of Western influences. Expensive portable icons in micromosaic were collected by rich patrons in both Byzantine and Western lands. This art form had been part of the Byzantine repertoire at least since the twelfth century, but after 1204 there was a renewed interest which has left over 20 extant examples. Often less than 25 centimeters in height, these later icons were made as impressively small as possible, composed of tesserae "no bigger than a pin's point... set in wax on a wooden ground". Some incorporated luxury materials such as gold and vitreous enamel, but all micromosaics were rendered precious by the time and skill required to build them.

=== Illuminated manuscripts ===
The majority of scribes who worked on manuscript illumination remain anonymous: only 17 of the 22 manuscripts preserved by Theodore Hagiopetrites (a copyist who lived around 1300 in Thessalonica) are signed. The production of books is rarer, probably because many copyists went into exile under Latin domination. Nevertheless, the scriptoria of the monastery of Panaghia Hodegetria in Constantinople remained active throughout the 14th century.

=== Monumental mosaics ===
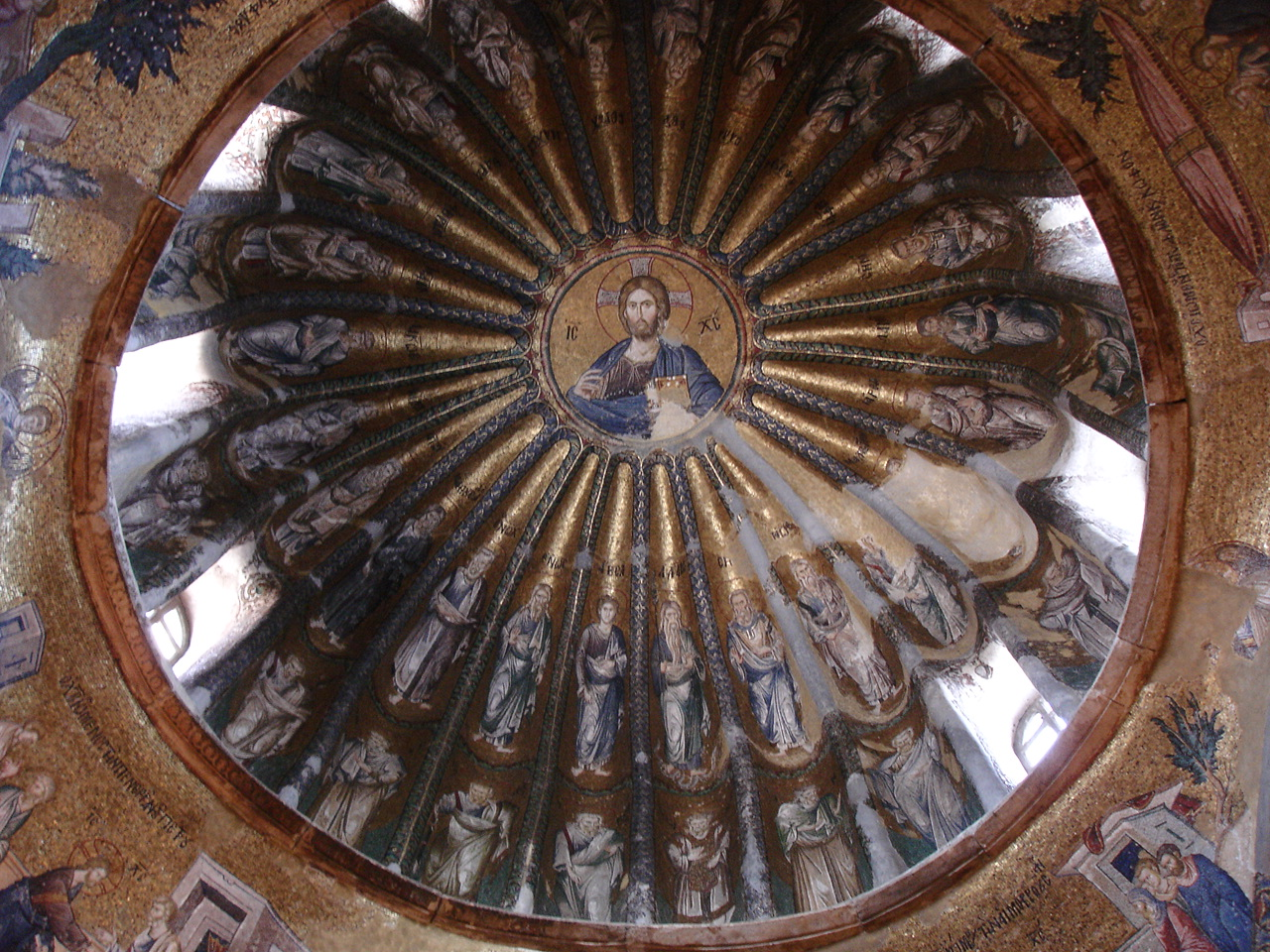
Dome mosaic in The Chora, Istanbul, with Jesus at the apex and Ancestors of Christ in the flutes below

Grand churches of the thirteenth and fourteenth centuries continued to receive mosaic decoration, including the Deesis of Hagia Sophia. This work gives its figures a gentle and compassionate aspect, and uses tiny tesserae to achieve fine modeling on their faces, evocative of painting; despite its monumental size, it seems intended to possess the personality of a panel icon. Large mosaics from Palaeologan Constantinople also survive in the Church-Mosque of Vefa, Chora Church, and the Pammakaristos Church. All three buildings feature a distinctive figural arrangement in the interiors of their domes, which have bust portraits of Christ Pantokrator or the Virgin Mary at their apexes. Ribs of masonry radiate out from the apexes, and the flutes, or flat surfaces between the ribs, display full-length portraits of Christian prophets or ancestors of Jesus. This compositional motif, evidently dictated by "the preferences of high ecclesiastical circles in the Capital", required coordination between the churches' builders and iconographic planners, to ensure that a dome had the right number of flutes to accommodate the intended group of figures. Elsewhere in the Byzantine world, mosaics were installed in the Holy Apostles Church of Thessaloniki, the Porta Panagia church of Thessaly, and the katholikon and chapel of Saint Nicholas in the Vatopedi Monastery of Mount Athos.

=== Architecture ===
Starting in the period of the Latin Empire, breakaway Byzantine states sought to dignify themselves by building churches and palaces in their capital cities. Their varying demographics and resources produced distinctive regional styles of architecture: Epirus built grandiose monuments incorporating much spolia from Roman ruins, and the Despotate of the Morea, held by the Crusaders until 1262, showed a pronounced Western influence. The plan and decoration of Hagia Sophia, in diversely-populated Trebizond, mixed Byzantine, Western, Georgian, and Seljuk Turkish motifs.

By contrast, Constantinople itself employed a conservative architectural style, showing strong continuity with previous centuries. The capital was short of funds, and obliged to concentrate upon repair work; most of its Palaeologan churches were enlargements of existing structures, usually in the form of "annexes enveloping earlier churches on three sides". This practice first appeared in Epirus and Thessaloniki before being adopted in Constantinople. The annexes in Thessaloniki may have been used for church ceremonies, while those in Constantinople housed lavish tomb monuments for the aristocrats who had sponsored their building. Among the refurbished buildings were Chora, the Church-Mosque of Vefa, the Pammakaristos Church, and the principal church of the Lips Monastery. The nobility commissioned mansions as well as churches, but the only secular building to survive from Palaeologan Constantinople is the so-called Palace of the Porphyrogenitus.

Unlike their precursors, which were inward-looking and often had solid, austere facades, Palaeologan churches were extensively decorated on the outside. More attention was paid to the external appearance of the domes on their roofs, and the walls were "enlivened plastically by means of niches, arcades, corbels, and strings of dentils− that is, elements that create a play of light and shadow". Many of these walls are also covered with patterns of multicolored stones and bricks, but it is not definitively known whether these were left visible or concealed beneath painted plaster. Porticos often appear on late Byzantine buildings, and were also popular in contemporary Venice. Mango says that one of these cultures passed the fashion for porticos to the other, but reserves judgement on which was the originator.

=== Dress ===
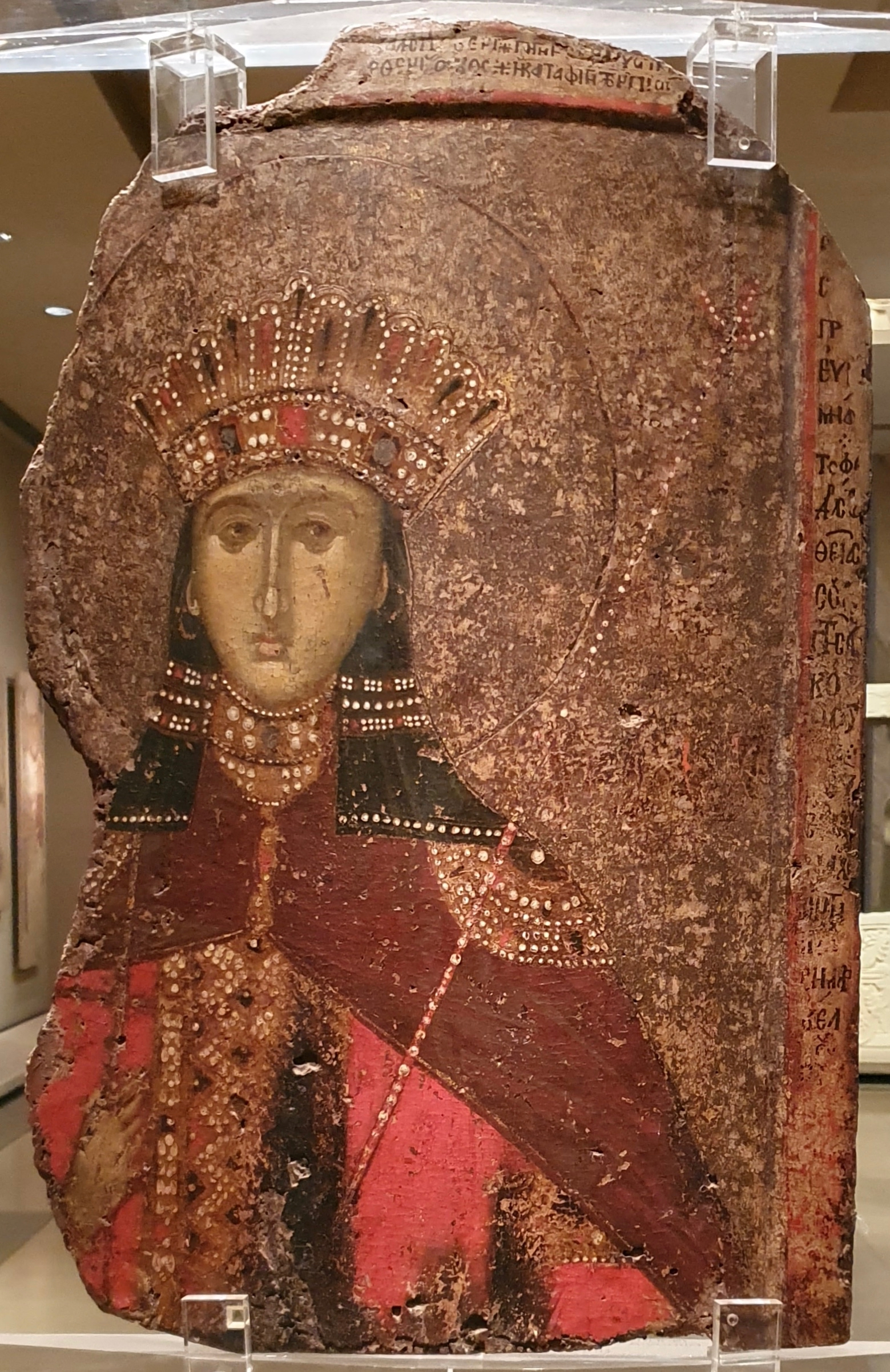
14th-century icon of St. Catherine, Veria

Two–dimensional artworks from the Palaeologan period— including the aforementioned donor portraits— show people dressed in elaborate costumes, giving evidence for personal adornments which have otherwise disappeared. Thus, the scholar Aimilia Yeroulanou suggests that late Byzantine jewelry was more abundant and sophisticated than one would gather from the sparse examples which survive. The pieces that were lost may have been similar to those made in Greek lands after the empire's fall: distinguished by "technical and aesthetic excellence rather than... the sumptuousness of the materials". The same secondary evidence leads David Talbot Rice to assert that the Byzantine silk industry survived into this period, and continued to produce garments decorated with the traditional tapestry technique. He adds, however, that tapestry was gradually supplanted by decorations in embroidery, which did not require specialized equipment to produce.

== See also ==
- Carolingian Renaissance
- Ottonian Renaissance
- Renaissance of the 11th century
- Renaissance of the 12th century
- Northumbria's Golden Age
- Golden Age of medieval Bulgarian culture
- Macedonian Renaissance
- Medieval renaissances

== Bibliography ==
- Cormack, Robin (2000). Byzantine Art. New York: Oxford University Press. ISBN 0-19-284211-0.
- Fryde, Edmund. The Early Palaeologan Renaissance (1261 – c. 1360). Leiden: Brill, 2000
- Helen C. Evans (Hrsg.): Byzantium. Faith and Power (1261–1557). New York: The Metropolitan Museum of Art, 2004
- Geanakoplos, Deno John. Constantinople and the West: Essays on the Late Byzantine (Palaeologan) and Italian Renaissances and the Byzantine and Roman Churches. Madison: The University of Wisconsin Press, 1989
- Late Byzantium Reconsidered: The Arts of the Palaiologan Era in the Mediterranean, edited by Andrea Mattiello and Maria Alessia Rossi. London: Taylor and Francis, 2019
- Mango, Cyril (1978). Byzantine Architecture. New York and Milan: Rizzoli International Publications, Inc., and Electa Editrice. ISBN 0-8478-0615-4.
- Mango, Cyril (1986). The Art of the Byzantine Empire 312-1453. Toronto, Buffalo, London: University of Toronto Press, in association with the Medieval Academy of America. ISBN 0-8020-6627-5.
- Rodley, Lyn (1994). Byzantine Art and Architecture: An Introduction. Cambridge: Cambridge University Press. ISBN 0-521-35724-1.
- Runciman, Steven. The Last Byzantine Renaissance. Cambridge: Cambridge University Press, 2008
- Ševčenko, Ihor. The Palaeologan Renaissance. Palo Alto: Stanford University Press, 1984
- Talbot Rice, David (1959). The Art of Byzantium. New York: Harry N. Abrams, Inc.
