= Macedonian Renaissance =

Byzantine cultural movement during the Macedonian dynasty

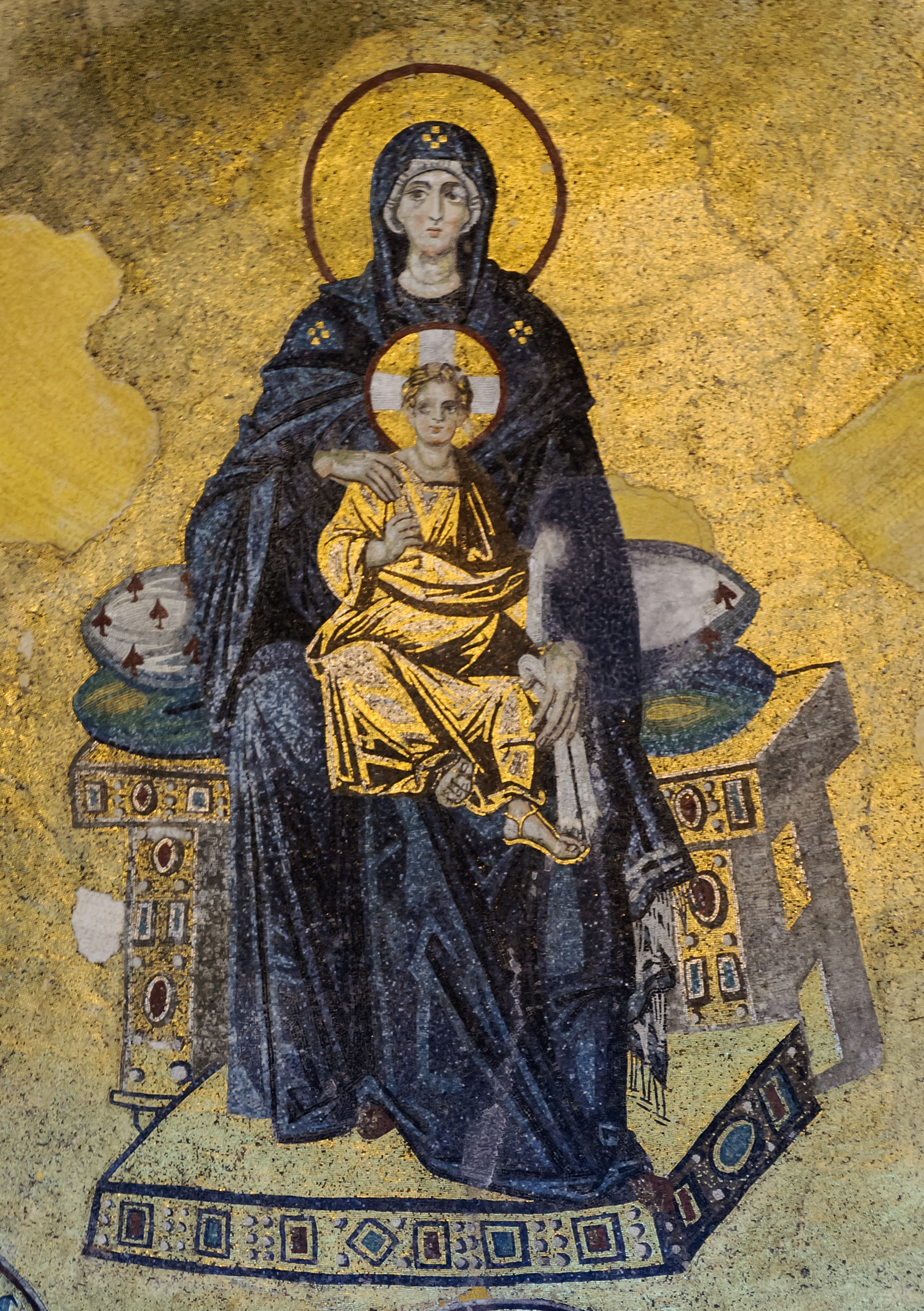
Virgin Mary with Christ mosaic, Hagia Sophia

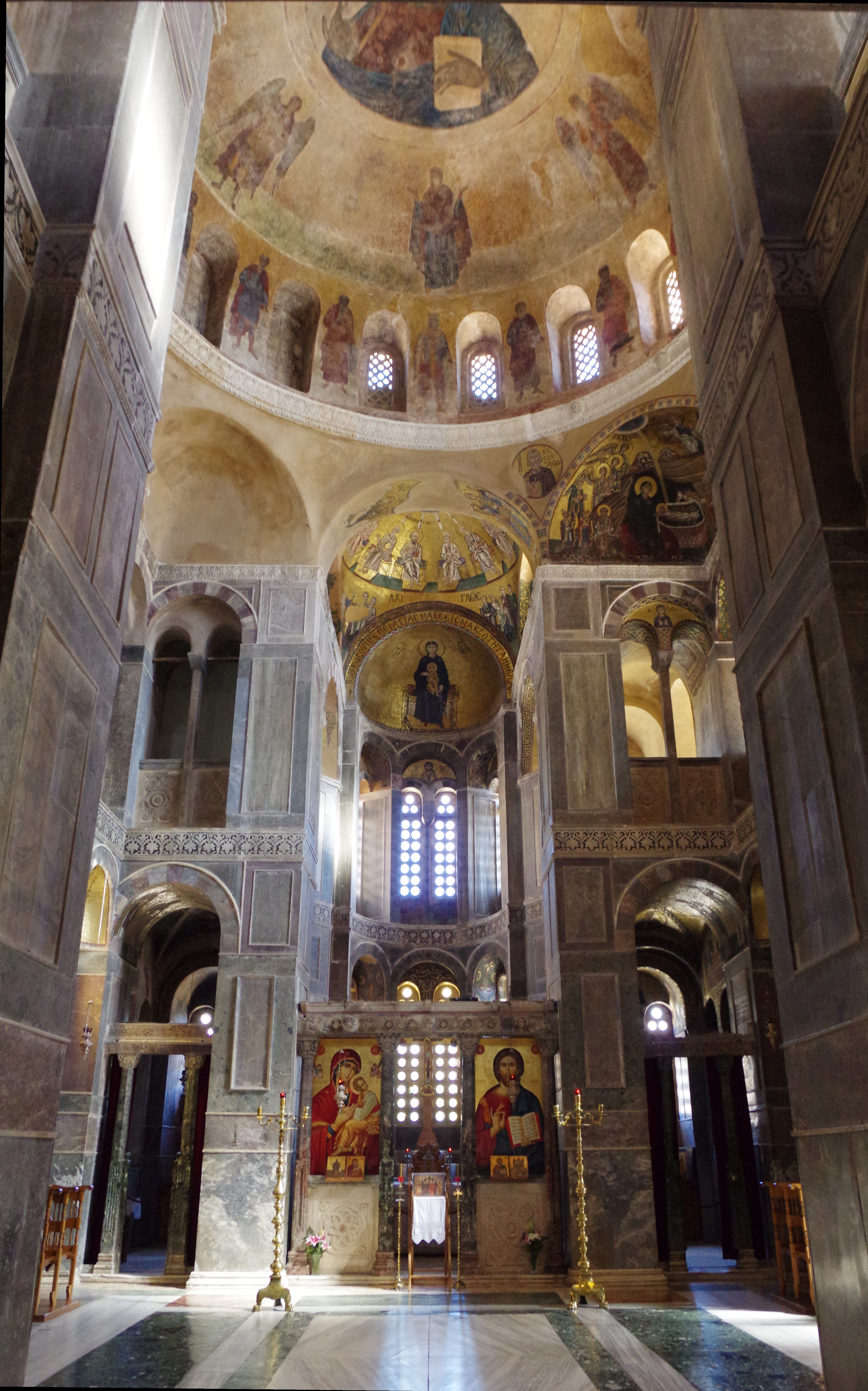
Interior of Hosios Loukas

The Macedonian Renaissance (Greek: Μακεδονική Αναγέννηση) is a historiographical term used for the blossoming of Byzantine culture in the 9th–11th centuries, under the eponymous Macedonian dynasty (867–1056), following the upheavals and transformations of the 7th–8th centuries, also known as the "Byzantine Dark Ages". The period is also known as the era of Byzantine encyclopedism because of attempts to systematically organize and codify knowledge, as exemplified by the works of the scholar Emperor Constantine VII Porphyrogennetos.

== Historiographical term ==
Because of problems with the term, scholars have employed alternative names to describe this period, including "renaissance" (with a small "r"), "renascence", Middle Byzantine Renaissance or First Byzantine Renaissance (the Palaeologan Renaissance from the 13th century on being the second). Macedonian art refers to the art of this period.

Since the word Renaissance (rinascita) was created in the 15th and the 16th centuries by Italian humanists to describe their own time, its use outside of that context is problematic; however, the period in question certainly did produce ideas and works of art that reflected a reassessment of classical ideals.

The term Macedonian Renaissance was first used by Kurt Weitzmann in his 1948 work, The Joshua Roll: A Work of the Macedonian Renaissance. It describes the architecture of Macedonia. At the same time, the manuscripts of "Paris Psalter" (cod. gr. 139, Paris, Bib. Nat. de France) were indicated as the best examples of Macedonian Renaissance by scholars.

== Background ==
During the 7th to the 8th centuries, literary production saw a drastic decline despite the gradual introduction of paper instead of the more expensive parchment. Books were scarce in that period and owned only by the richest aristocrats.

From the 7th century onwards, Medieval Greek was the only language of administration, government and art in the Byzantine Empire, while the religion was Orthodox Christianity.

While the Western Roman Empire had collapsed at the outset of the Middle Ages, the Eastern Roman Empire survived, mainly because of its strategic location for commerce but also by holding back its enemies. Basil I (867–886), the founder of the Macedonian dynasty of Byzantine rulers, was born in Thrace to a peasant family that was said to be of paternal Armenian descent. He was employed in the influential circles of Constantinople and was rapidly promoted by Emperor Michael III eventually becoming co-emperor. By means of political maneuvering he was able to secure his future as emperor and then began military and diplomatic campaigns to secure the empire. His dynasty was able to maintain a period of peace under which economics, philosophy, art, and culture could thrive.

Two main developments helped drive the revival in culture and education in the empire: the greater involvement of the church in education (such as those in the Studite Monastery) and the concentration of cultural life in Constantinople from the movement of peoples from the countryside, which became a magnet for intellectuals.

== Introduction ==
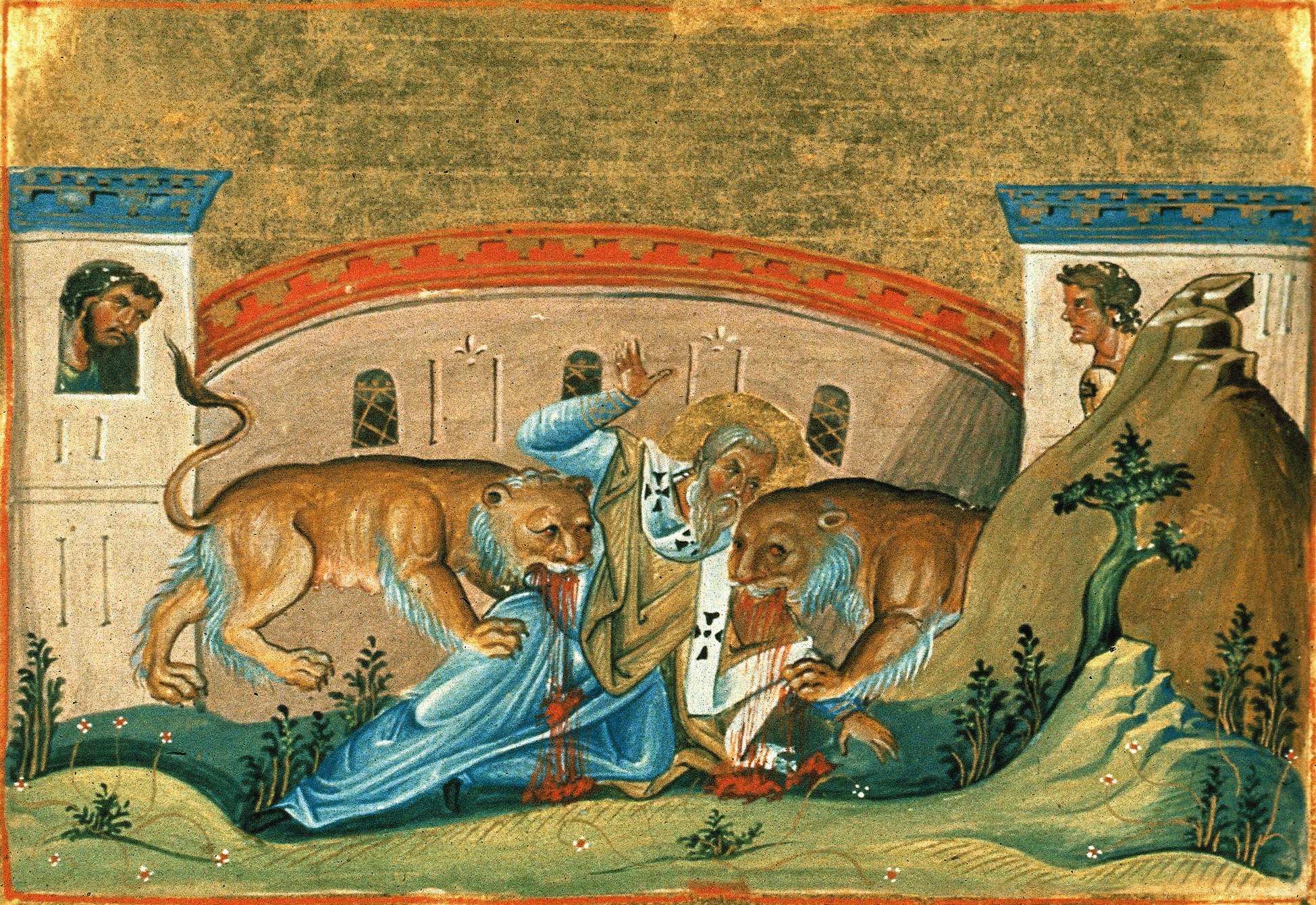
Illustration of Ignatius of Antioch being martyred.

Large-scale productions of religious art resumed only after the Second Iconoclasm in 843. The art of the Macedonian Renaissance maintained its roots from the Late Roman period by using its decorative and artistic styles. This period produced a shift from the ban on the painting of religious figures to icons being painted to reflect the more classical and naturalistic influences of art on the culture. The new style of art may have inspired Italian artists such as Cimabue and Giotto at the dawn of the Italian Renaissance, in the Proto-Renaissance.

== Architecture ==
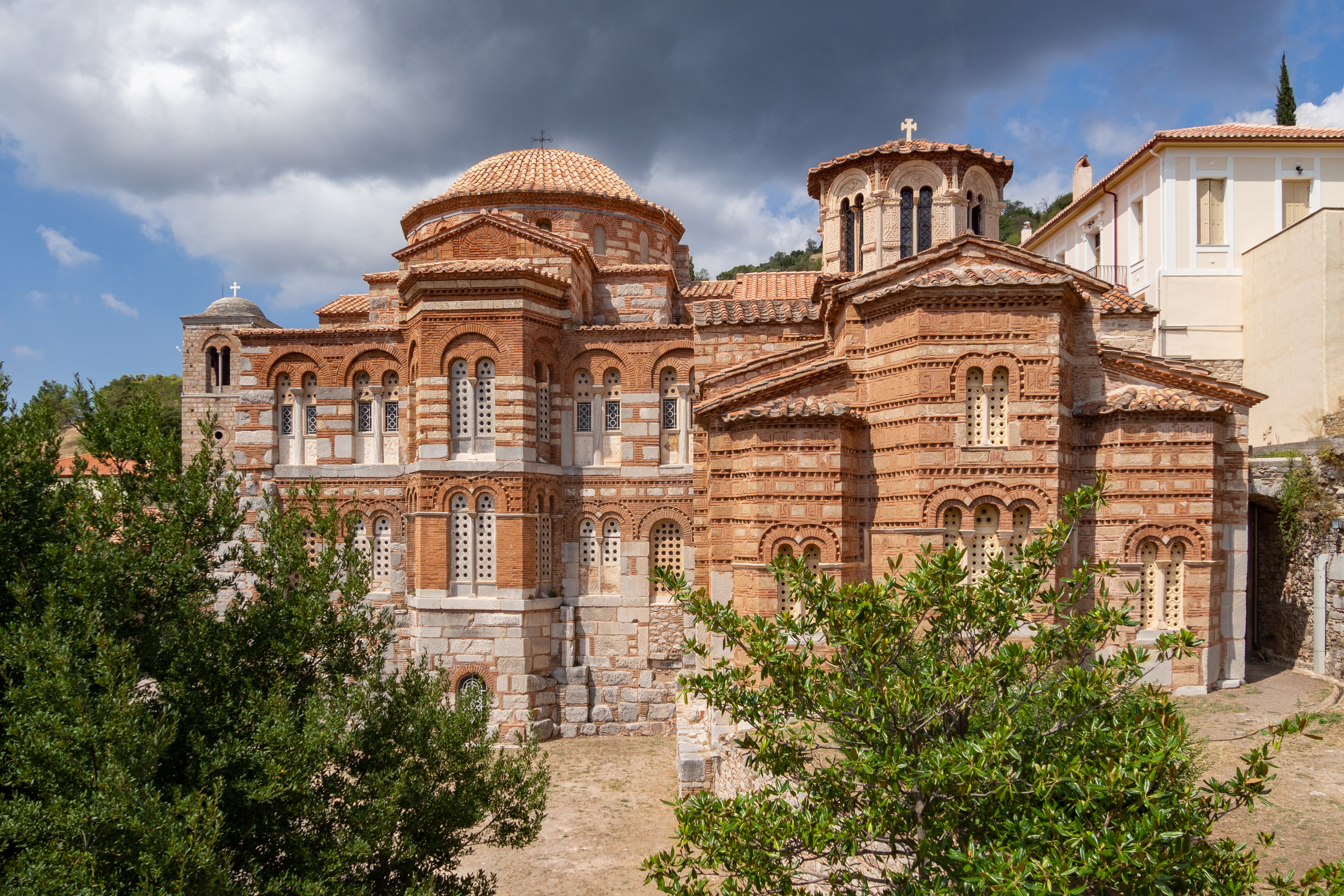
Hosios Loukas.

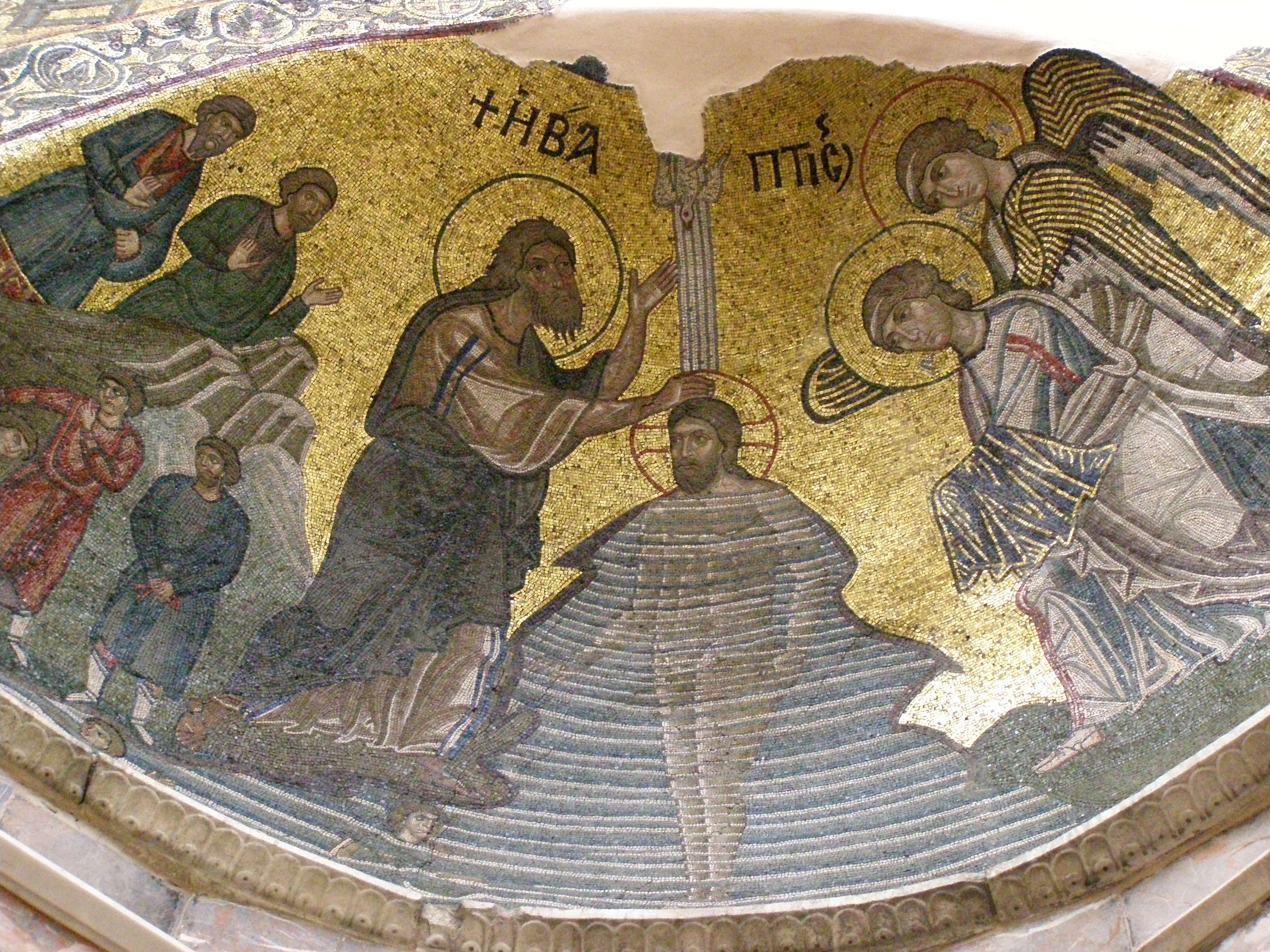
Nea Moni Monastery 1049

The second half of the 9th century saw a lavish programme of redecoration of churches, such as the creation of mosaics in the Hagia Sophia. the building of the now lost Nea Ekklesia of Basil I (built between 876 and 880) and the Completion of the Church of the Virgin of the Pharos in 864. This imperial building campaign continued into the early 10th century with the building of the Myrelaion. church and palace complex between 913 and 922 culminating in the churches of the late 10th/mid 11th century such as the Nea Moni. Hosios Loukas and the Daphni Monastery all located in Greece.

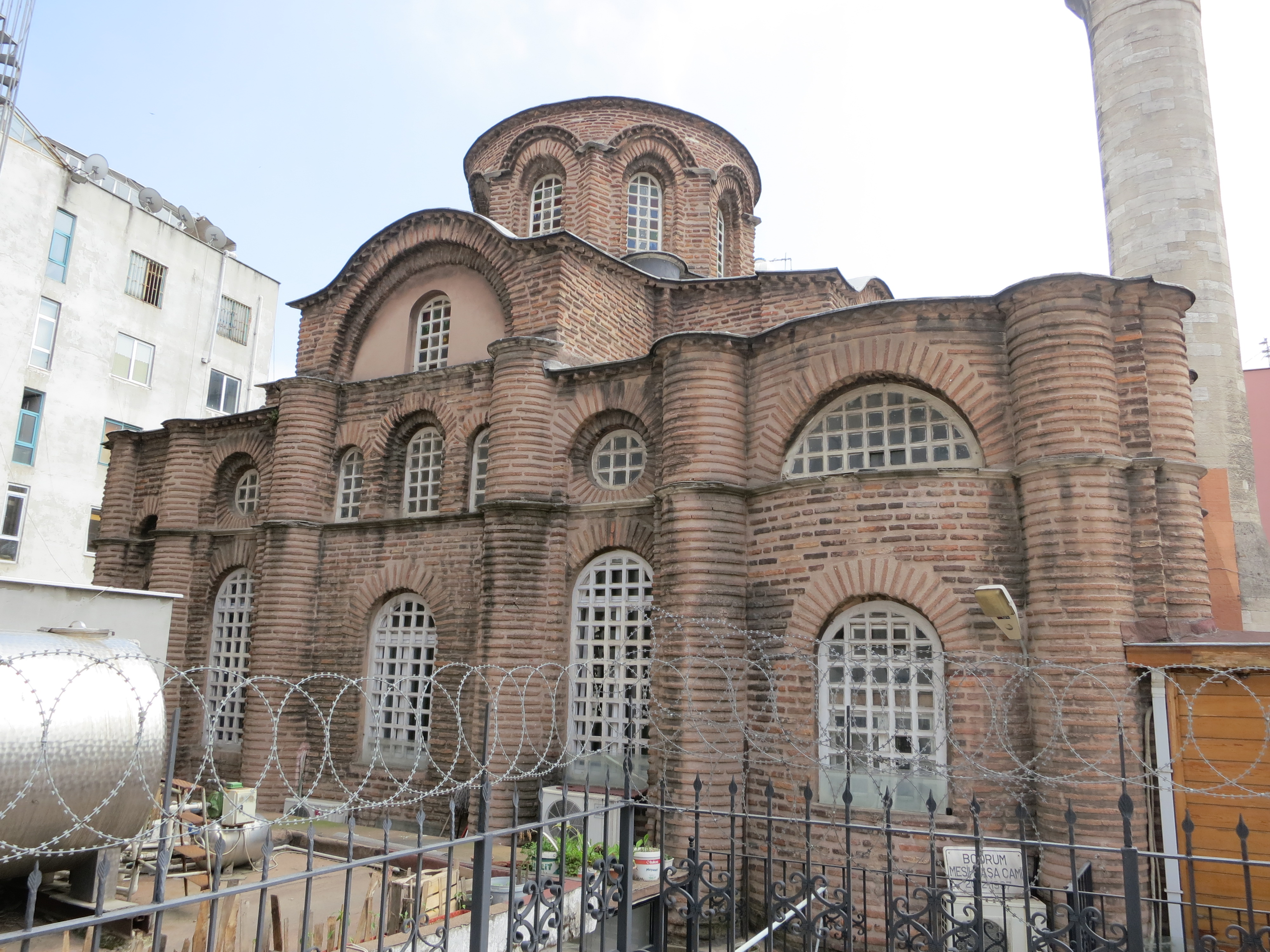
the Myrelaion Church built in 922.

== Literature and education ==
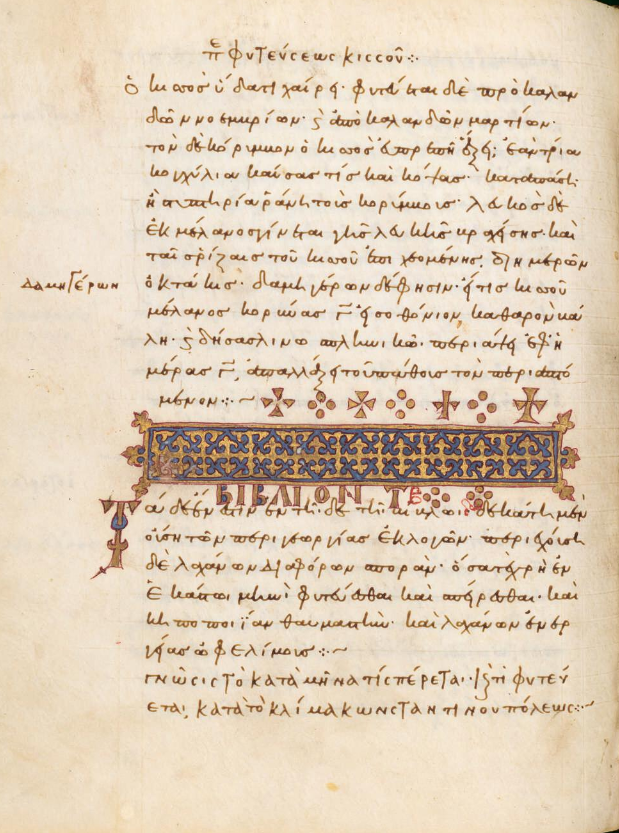
Geoponica

By the Macedonian Renaissance, the period also saw a proliferation of literature, such as De Ceremoniis ("The Book of Ceremonies"), which focused on governance, diplomatic interactions with neighboring nations, and other customs of the time. Education had also become a priority once again and the University of Constantinople boasted scholars such as Michael Psellus, who wrote the Chronographia, a history of fourteen Byzantine rulers. Meanwhile, reforms in law sought to limit the power and growth of large landowners by the formation of trade guilds, which allowed the state to control growth, as described in the Book of the Eparch.

In science and mathematics, Leo the Mathematician contributed vastly on the subject and he was also known for constructing an optical telegraph from Constantinople to the eastern regions of the empire. Magnaura, a building in Constantinople, had already become a school in 849 and was headed by Leo the Mathematician, whose works are now lost.

=== Encyclopaedism ===
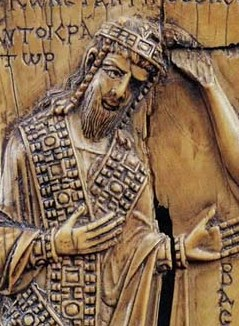
Constantine VII (r. 913-959) the author of the De Administrando Imperio.

Paul Lemerle introduced the term "encyclopaedism" for this period to reflect the systematic attempts at ordering and organizing knowledge in all spheres of cultural and administrative activity. This activity resulted in the compilation of manuals on court hierarchy and administration (Taktika), military affairs, taxation, agriculture (Geoponika), reference works such as the Suda encyclopaedia and the Bibliotheca, as well as new codifications of Roman law (the Basilika) and regulations in the Book of the Eparch. The spirit of the age was exemplified by Emperor Constantine VII Porphyrogennetos, who produced three encyclopaedic manuals: the De Administrando Imperio, De Thematibus, and De Ceremoniis. Other notable figures were the polymaths Leo the Mathematician, Patriarch Photios, and Arethas of Caesarea. However, as Alexander Kazhdan notes, their "emphasis was not on creativity, but on copying and collecting".

== See also ==
- Macedonian art (Byzantine)
- Paris Psalter
- Leo Bible
- Hosios Loukas
- Daphni Monastery
- Nea Moni
- Carolingian Renaissance
- Ottonian Renaissance
- Renaissance of the 11th century
- Renaissance of the 12th century
- Northumbria's Golden Age
- Golden Age of medieval Bulgarian culture
- Palaeologan Renaissance

== Sources ==
- Kazhdan, Alexander, ed. (1991). The Oxford Dictionary of Byzantium. Oxford and New York: Oxford University Press. ISBN 0-19-504652-8.
- Treadgold, Warren (1984). "The Macedonian Renaissance". In Warren Treadgold (ed.). Renaissances before the Renaissance. Cultural Revivals of Late Antiquity and the Middle Ages. Stanford, CA: Stanford University Press. ISBN 0-8047-1198-4.
- Striker, Cecil L. (1981). The Myrelaion (Bodrum Camii) in Istanbul. Princeton NJ: Princeton University Press. p. 6.
- "The Nea Moni of Chios". Church of Greece. Archived from the original on 2011-08-07.
- Darling, Janina (2004). Architecture of Greece. Westport, CT: Greenwood Press. p. 69.
