= Holy Lance =

Lance that pierced Jesus' side as he hung on the cross

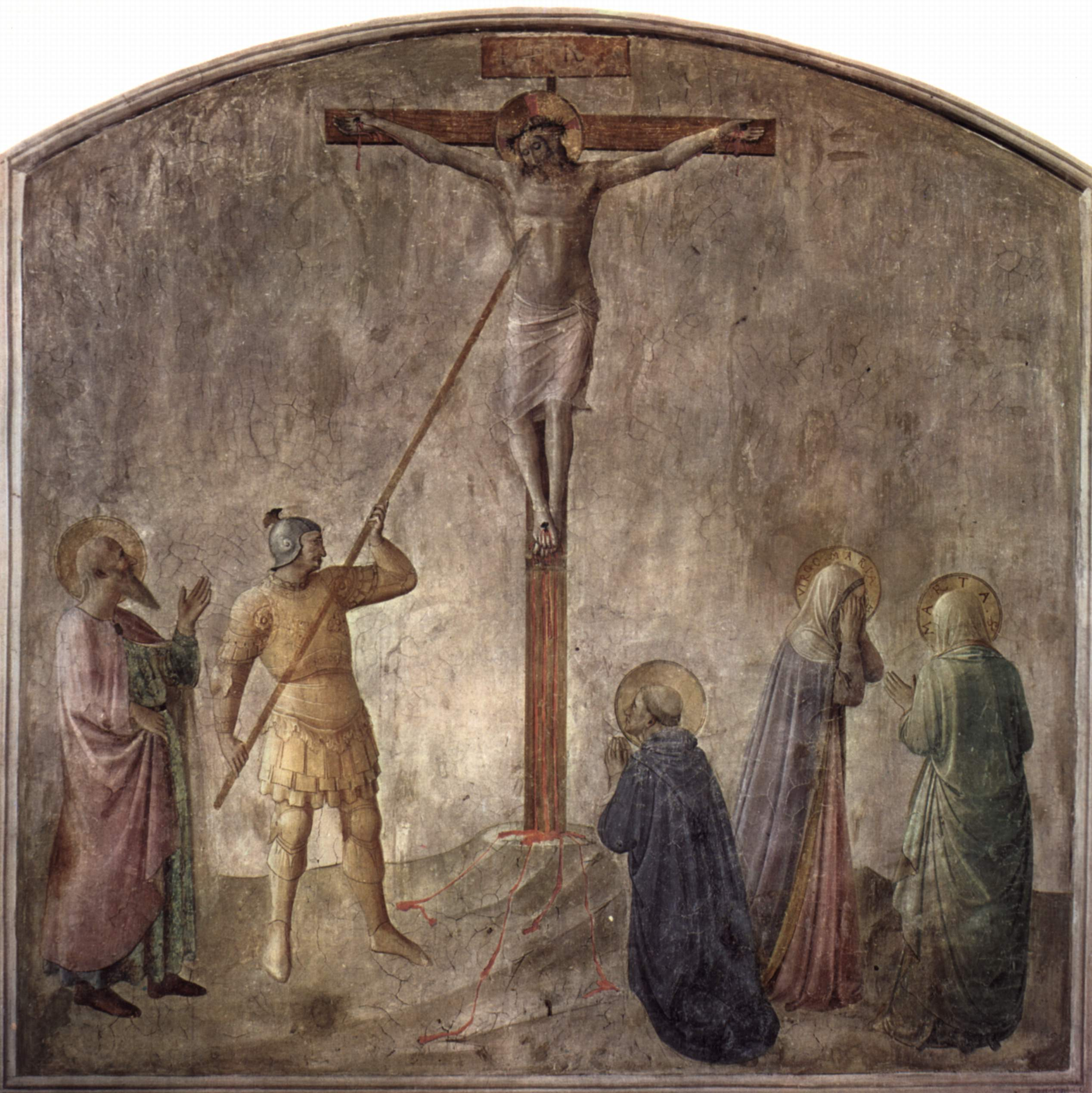
Fresco by Fra Angelico, Dominican monastery at San Marco, Florence, showing the lance piercing the side of Jesus on the cross (c. 1440)

The Holy Lance, also known as the Spear of Longinus (named after Saint Longinus), the Spear of Destiny, or the Holy Spear, is the lance that pierced the side of Jesus as he hung on the cross during his crucifixion. As with other instruments of the Passion, the lance is only briefly mentioned in the New Testament, but later became the subject of extrabiblical traditions in the medieval church. Relics purported to be the lance began to appear as early as the 6th century, originally in Jerusalem. By the Late Middle Ages, relics identified as the spearhead of the Holy Lance (or fragments thereof) had been described throughout Europe. Several of these artifacts are still preserved.

Holy Lance relics have typically been used for religious ceremonies, but at times some of them have been considered to be guarantees of victory in battle. For example, Henry the Fowler's lance was credited for winning the Battle of Riade, and the Crusaders believed their discovery of a Holy Lance brought them a favorable end to the Siege of Antioch.

In the modern era, major Holy Lance relics are located in Rome, Vienna and Vagharshapat. The Lance kept in Vienna, adorned with a distinctive gold cuff, is on public display with the rest of the Imperial Regalia at the Hofburg.

== Biblical references ==
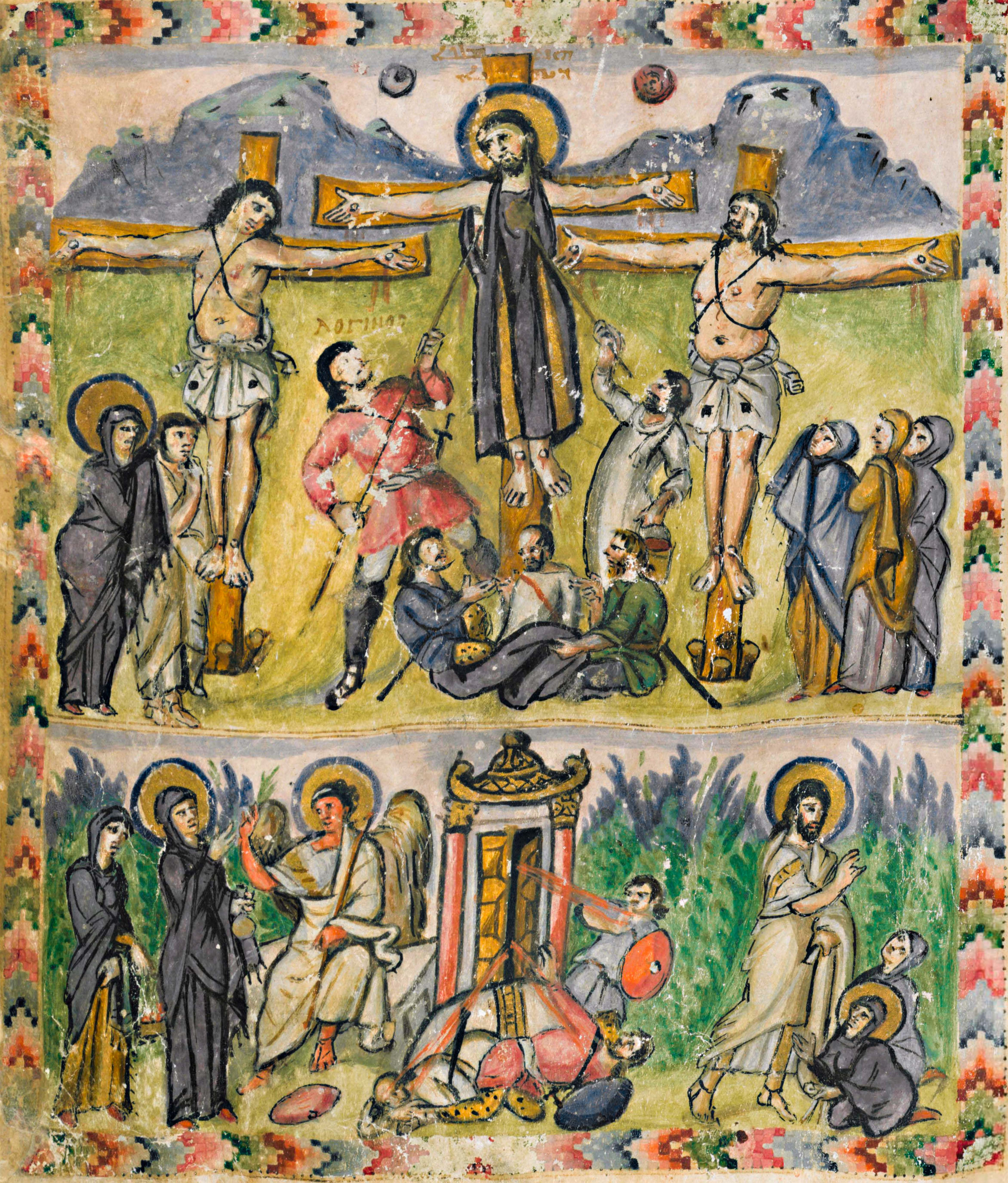
Miniature of the Crucifixion from the Rabula Gospels. "Loginos" is depicted piercing the right side of Jesus with a spear.

The lance (Greek: λόγχη, lonkhē) is mentioned in the Gospel of John, but not in the Synoptic Gospels. The gospel states that the Romans planned to break Jesus' legs, a method of hastening death during a crucifixion known as crurifragium. Jesus's followers wanted to ensure that he died before the start of the Sabbath at sundown on Friday, so that he could be promptly laid to rest; burials are not traditionally permitted on the Sabbath. Just before they did so, they noticed that Jesus was already dead and that there was no reason to break his legs ("and no bone will be broken"). (Note: This verse is reference to Psalms 34:20 regarding the righteous person, and commandments concerning the paschal lamb in Exodus 12:46 and Numbers 9:12.) To make sure that he was dead, a Roman soldier stabbed him in the side.

One of the soldiers pierced his side with a lance (λόγχη), and immediately there came out blood and water.

— John 19:34

The Gospel of John does not give the name of the soldier who pierced Christ's side with a lonchē. The oldest known references to the legend, the apocryphal Gospel of Nicodemus, appended to late manuscripts of the 4th century Acts of Pilate, identify the soldier as a centurion and called Longinus (making the spear's Latin name Lancea Longini).

A form of the name Longinus occurs in the Rabula Gospels in the late 6th century. In a miniature, the name ΛΟΓΙΝΟΣ (LOGINOS) is written above the head of the soldier who is thrusting his lance into Christ's side. This is one of the earliest records of the name, if the inscription is not a later addition.

== Relics ==
=== The Holy Lance kept at Jerusalem ===
The earliest known references to Holy Lance relics date to the 6th century. The Breviary of Jerusalem (circa 530) describes the lance on display at the Church of the Holy Sepulchre. In his Expositio Psalmorum (c. 540–548), Cassiodorus asserts the continued presence of the lance in Jerusalem. A report by the Piacenza pilgrim (c. 570) places the lance in the Church of Zion. Gregory of Tours described the lance and other relics of the Passion in his Libri Miraculorum (c. 574–594).

=== The Holy Lance kept at Constantinople ===
In 614, Jerusalem was captured by the Sasanian general Shahrbaraz. The Chronicon Paschale says that the Holy Lance was among the relics captured, but one of Shahrbaraz's associates gave it to Nicetas who brought it to the Hagia Sophia in Constantinople later that year. However, De locis sanctis, describing the pilgrimage of Arculf in 670, places the lance in Jerusalem, at the Church of the Holy Sepulchre. Arculf is the last of the medieval pilgrims to report the lance in Jerusalem, as Willibald and Bernard made no mention of it.

By the middle of the 10th century, a lance relic was venerated in Constantinople at the Church of the Virgin of the Pharos. The relic was likely viewed by some of the soldiers and clergy participating in the First Crusade, adding to the confusion surrounding the emergence of another Holy Lance at Antioch in 1098.

According to Alberic of Trois-Fontaines, a fragment of the Holy Lance was set into the icon that Alexios V Doukas lost in battle with Henry of Flanders in 1204. The capture of this icon by Henry's forces was considered important to many contemporary sources on the Fourth Crusade. In addition to the crusaders' report to Pope Innocent III, the incident was documented by Geoffrey of Villehardouin, the Devastatio Constantinopolitana, Niketas Choniates, Robert de Clari, Ralph of Coggeshall, and Robert of Auxerre. However, none of these sources mention the icon bearing any relics, whereas Alberic claimed it was adorned with the lance fragment, a portion of the Holy Shroud, one of Jesus's deciduous teeth, and other relics from thirty martyrs. Modern historians have regarded Alberic's account with some skepticism, characterizing it as "fanciful" and "pure invention." In any case, after the battle the crusaders sent the icon to Cîteaux Abbey, but there is no record of whether it reached that destination.

==== Transfer to Paris ====
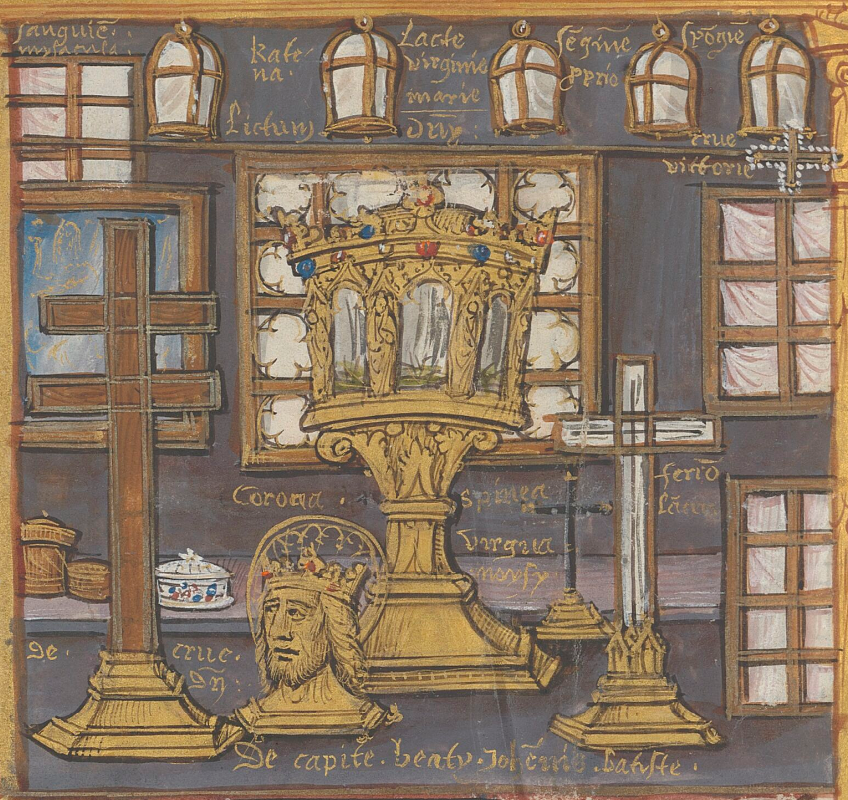
16th century Illustration of holy relics displayed in the Grande Châsse the Sainte-Chapelle. The cross on the far right is the reliquary for the Holy Lance relic.

Following the sack of Constantinople, Robert de Clari described the spoils won by the newly established Latin Empire, including "the iron of the lance with which Our Lord had His side pierced," in the Church of the Virgin of the Pharos. However, by the 1230s, the Latin Empire's financial state had grown desperate. In 1239, Baldwin II arranged to sell Constantinople's Crown of Thorns relic to King Louis IX of France. Over the next several years, Baldwin sold a total of twenty-two relics to Louis. The Holy Lance was included in the final lot, which probably arrived at Paris in 1242. All of these relics were later enshrined in the Sainte Chapelle. During the French Revolution they were removed to the Bibliothèque Nationale, but the lance subsequently disappeared.

Despite the transfer of the Holy Lance to Paris, various travelers continued to report its presence in Constantinople throughout the late Byzantine period. Of particular interest, John Mandeville described the lance relics in both Paris and Constantinople, stating that the latter was much larger than the former. Although the authenticity of Mandeville's travelogue is questionable, the widespread popularity of the work demonstrates that the existence of multiple Holy Lance relics was public knowledge.

==== Transfer to Rome ====
The relics remaining in Constantinople, including the lance, were presumably seized by Sultan Mehmed II in 1453 when he conquered the city. In 1492, his son Bayezid II sent the lance to Pope Innocent VIII, to encourage the pope to continue to keep his brother and rival Cem prisoner. At this time great doubts as to its authenticity were felt at Rome, as Johann Burchard records, because of the presence of other rival lances in Paris, Nuremberg, and Armenia. This relic has never since left Rome, and its resting place is at Saint Peter's Basilica in a loggia carved into the pillar above the statue of Saint Longinus.

In the mid-18th century Pope Benedict XIV states that he obtained an exact drawing of the Saint Chapelle lance, to compare it with the spearhead in St. Peter's. He concluded that former relic was the broken point missing from the latter, and that the two fragments had originally formed one blade.

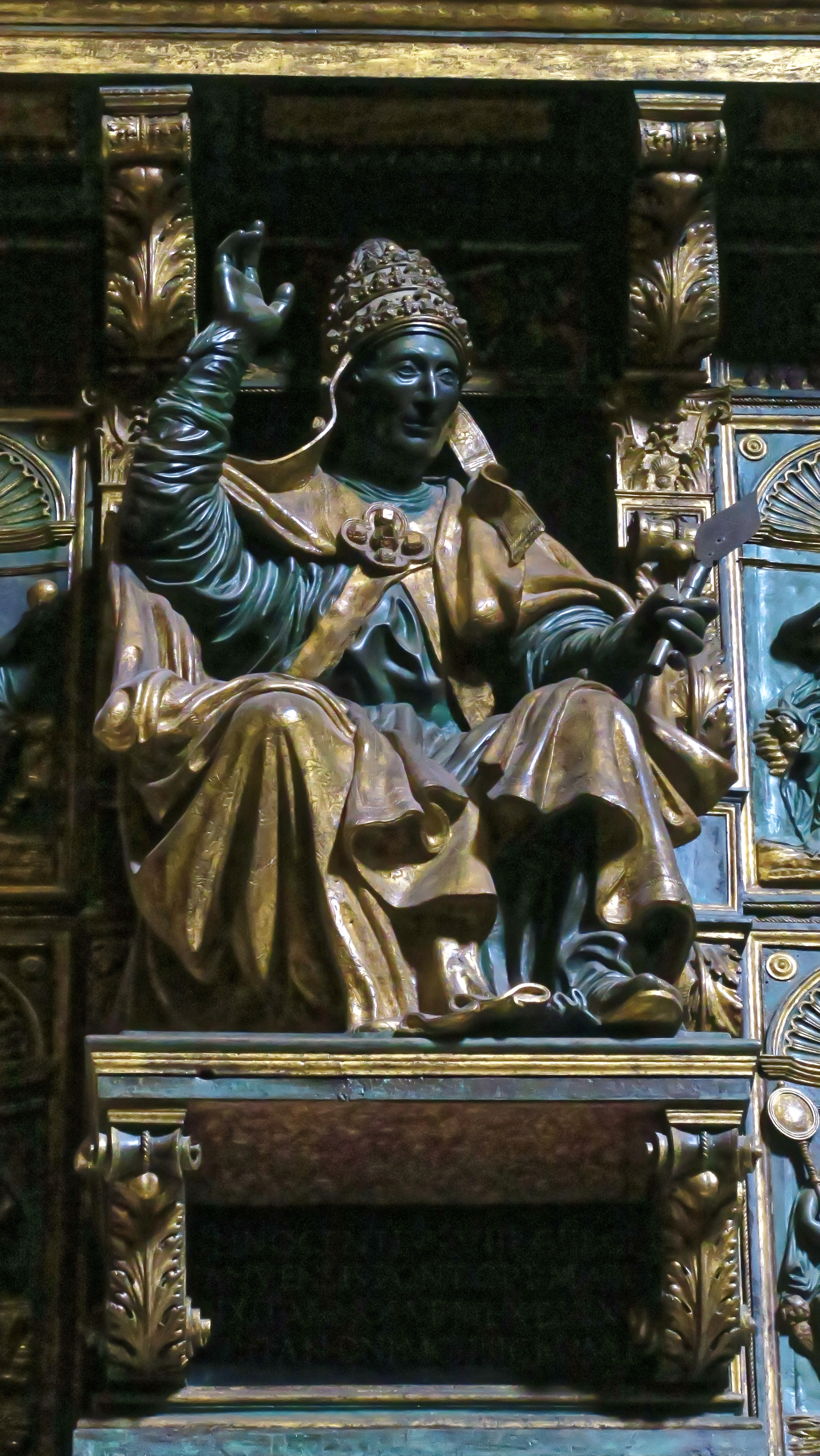
Tomb of Pope Innocent VIII, with a bronze effigy of the pope holding the spear blade he received by Sultan Bayezid II

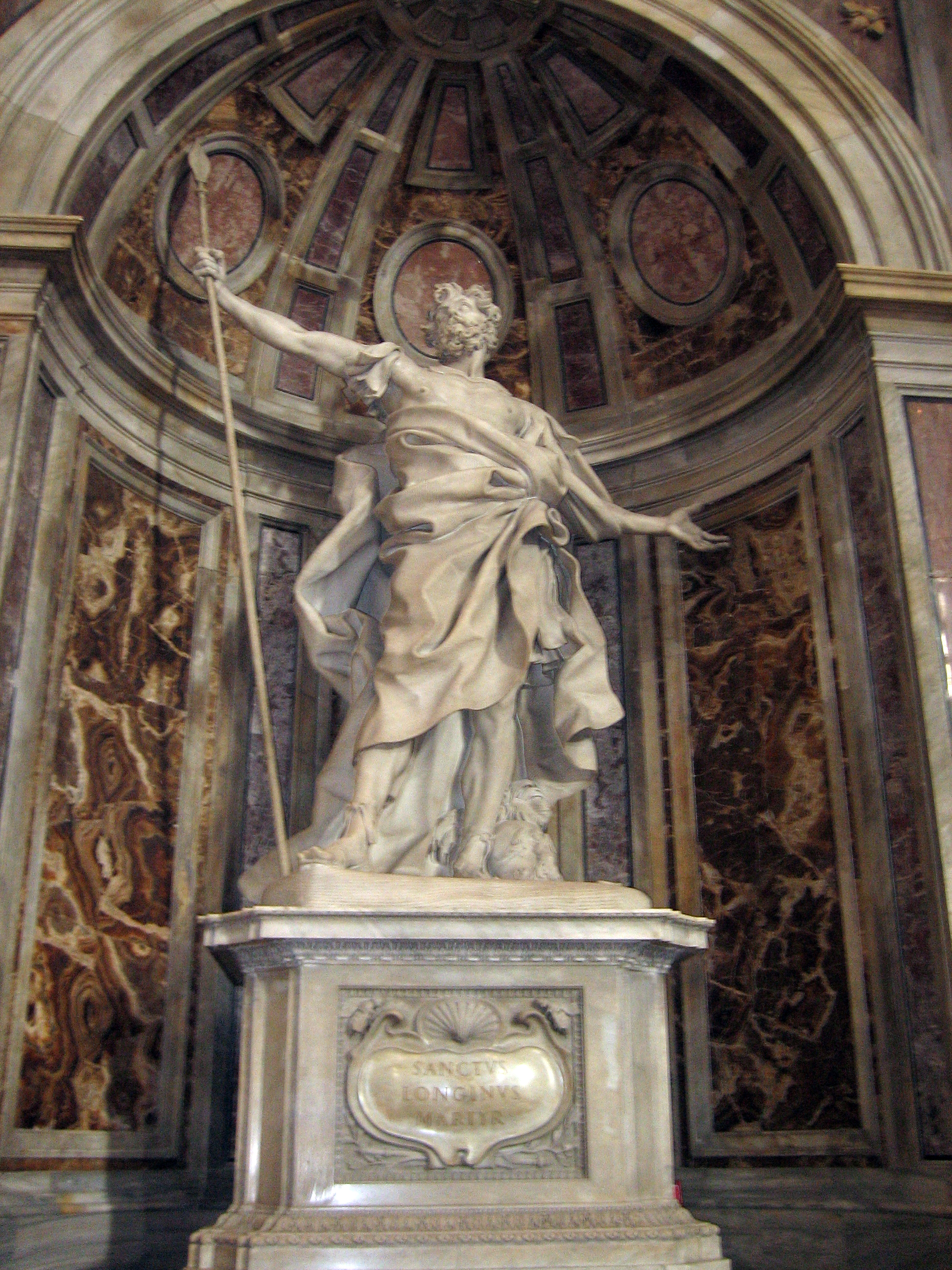
Statue of Saint Longinus at Saint Peter's Basilica

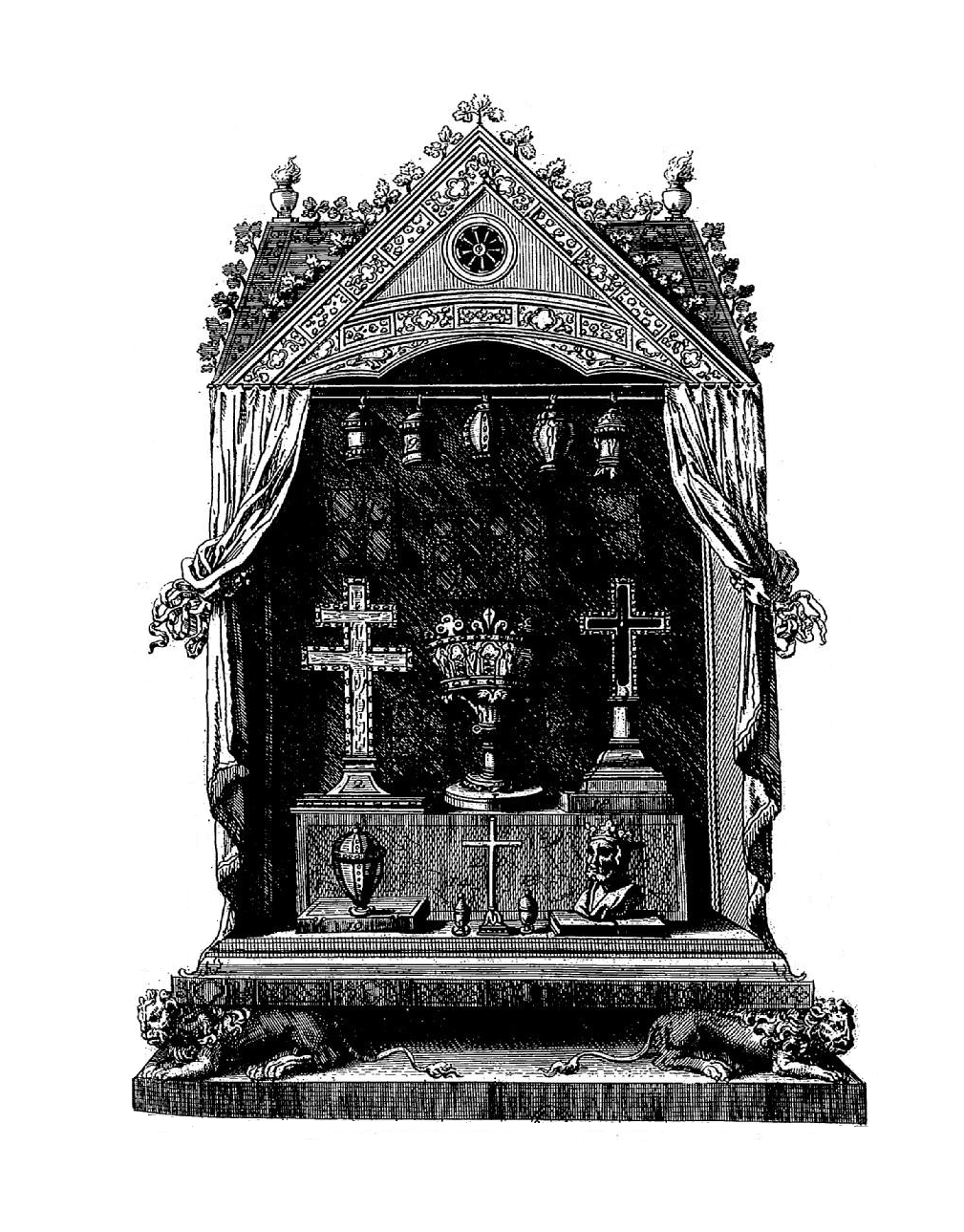
1790 drawing of the relics at Sainte-Chapell; the lance tip is in the reliquary at the right hand side.

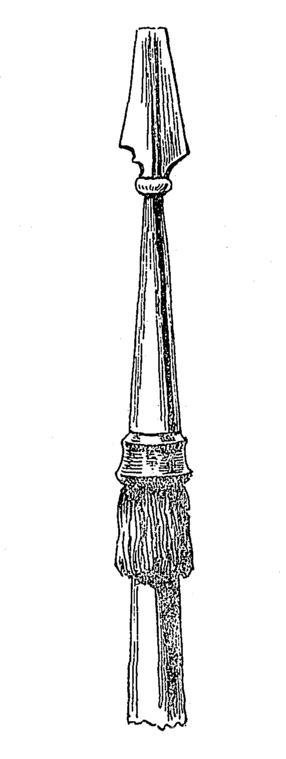
1898 drawing of the Holy Lance in Rome

=== The Holy Lance of Vienna ===
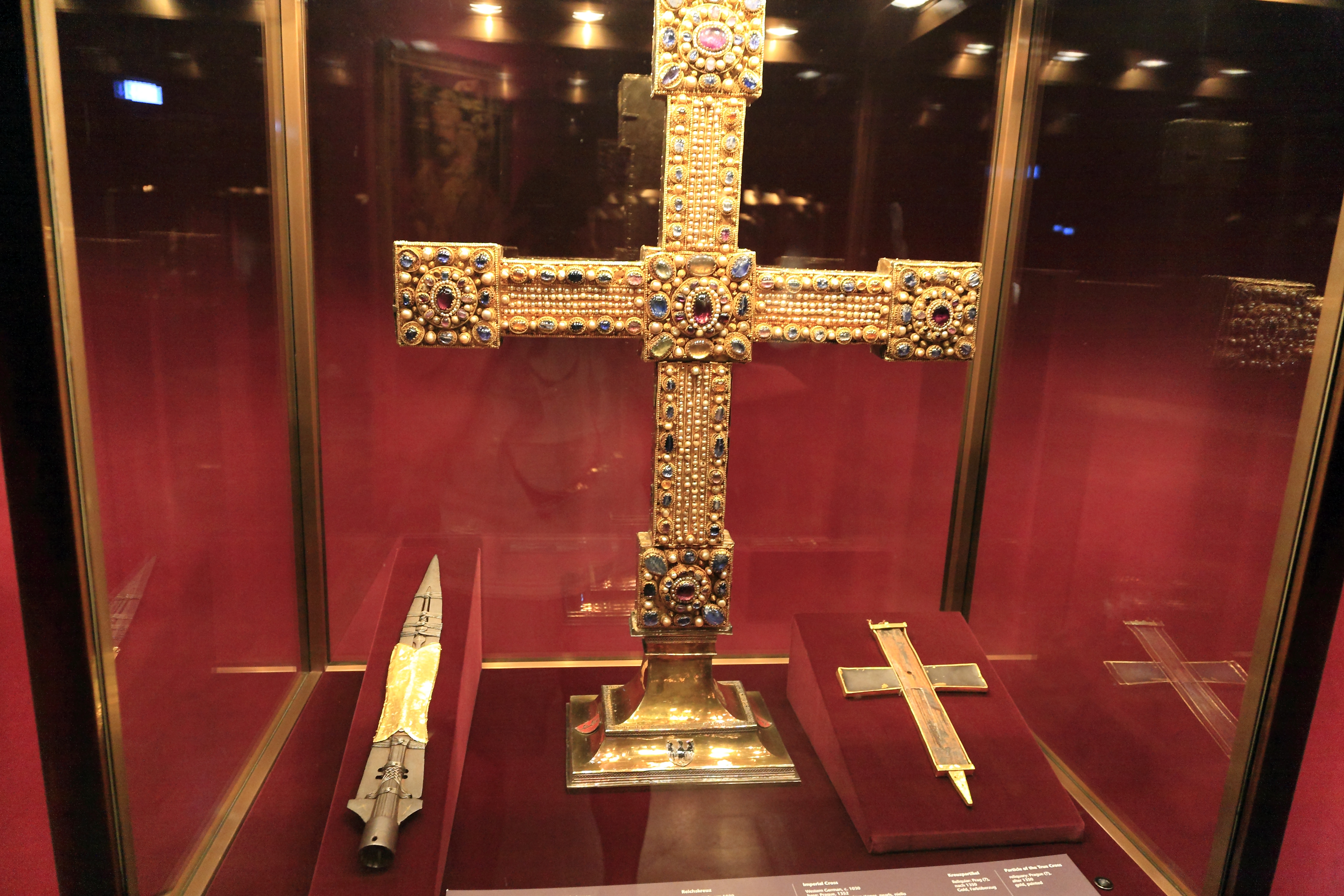
The Holy Lance (left) on display with other items from the Imperial Regalia in Vienna

The Holy Lance in Vienna is displayed in the Imperial Treasury (Weltliche Schatzkammer) at the Hofburg Palace in Vienna, Austria. It is the head of a typical winged lance of the Carolingian dynasty. The shaft was presumably lost or destroyed by the reign of Conrad II (1024–1039), who commissioned the Reichskreuz ("Imperial Cross") to serve as a reliquary for the spearhead.

The spearhead is wrapped in a distinctive gold cuff, added by Charles IV around 1354. The cuff is inscribed with the Latin text "LANCEA ET CLAVVS DOMINI" ("The lance and nail of the Lord"), saying that the lance was once used by Longinus and that one of the Holy Nails has been incorporated into the spearhead. The gold cuff covers an older, silver cuff produced for Henry IV between 1084 and 1105, which also refers to the Holy Nail but identifies the spearhead as the lance of Saint Maurice. Gilded stripes on both sides of the silver cuff bear another Latin inscription: "CLAVVS DOMINICVS HEINRICVS D[EI] GR[ATI]A TERCIVS / ROMANO[RVM] IMPERATOR AVG[VSTVS] HOC ARGEN / TVM IVSSIT / FABRICARl AD CONFIRMATIONE[M] / CLAVI D[OMI]NI ET LANCEE SANCTI MAVRI / CII // SANCTVS MAVRICIVS" ("Nail of the Lord Henry by the Grace of God the Third, Emperor of the Romans and Augustus, ordered this silver piece to be made to reinforce the Nail of the Lord and the Lance of St. Maurice / Saint Maurice").

According to Liutprand of Cremona, the first German monarch to obtain the lance was King Henry the Fowler who purchased it in 926, from King Rudolf II of Burgundy. Rudolf is supposed to have received the lance as a gift from a "Count Samson", about whom nothing else is known. Liutprand associated the lance not with Longinus, but with Constantine the Great, citing a claim that the Roman emperor used the Holy Nails, discovered by his mother Helena, to make crosses in the middle of the spearhead. The description given by Liutprand closely corresponds to the relic kept in Vienna today.

An alternative account of how Henry received the lance is offered by Widukind of Corvey. According to Widukind, King Conrad I of Germany made arrangements on his deathbed in 918 to send his royal insignia, including the Holy Lance, to Henry, who would succeed him as king of East Francia. This version of events has been rejected by historians.

On 15 March 933, Henry carried his lance as he led his forces against the Magyars in the Battle of Riade. From that point forward, the Ottonian dynasty regarded the lance as a talisman guaranteeing victory. The timing of the battle—on the feast day of Longinus—indicates that by this time Henry associated the relic with the lance used in the crucifixion. Along the same lines, it may be telling that Henry's son Otto the Great fought the Battle of Birten in the first half of March 939. However, in 955 Otto sought support from Saint Lawrence to secure victory in the Battle of Lechfeld, which was planned to occur on Lawrence's feast day. This shift may have resulted from the increased diplomatic ties between Germany and the Byzantine Empire circa 949/950. As the Germans became aware of the Byzantine version of the Holy Lance, it became politically inconvenient to associate the Ottonian lance with Longinus. By 1008 the lance was identified with that of Saint Maurice, who had been venerated by Otto the Great.

Otto III commissioned two replicas of the lance. One of these was given to Prince Vajk of Hungary in 996, who was later crowned King Stephen I. The other was presented to Duke of Poland, Bolesław I, at the Congress of Gniezno in 1000. The Polish lance is currently displayed in the John Paul II Cathedral Museum in Kraków. The fate of the Hungarian lance is less clear. When Stephen's successor, Peter Orseolo was deposed in 1041, he sought the aid of German king Henry III, who captured the lance in the Battle of Ménfő. Whether Henry returned the lance to Peter upon his restoration is uncertain. Shortly before World War I, a gold-inlaid spearhead, identified as a Germanic work from around the year 1000, was dredged from the Danube River near Budapest. The gold inlay suggests that this artifact could be Stephen's lance replica, but this has not been confirmed.

In 1424, Sigismund had a collection of relics, including the lance, moved from his capital in Prague to his birthplace, Nuremberg, and decreed them to be kept there forever. This collection was called the Imperial Regalia (Reichskleinodien).

When the French Revolutionary army approached Nuremberg in the spring of 1796, the local authorities turned over the Imperial Regalia to Johann Alois von Hügel, Chief Commissary of the Imperial Diet. Baron von Hügel took the regalia to Ratisbon for safekeeping, but by 1800 that city was also under threat of invasion, so he relocated them again to Passau, Linz, and Vienna. When the French entered Vienna in 1805, the collection was moved again to Hungary, before ultimately returning to Vienna. These movements were conducted in secret, as the status of the regalia had not been resolved amid plans for the dissolution of the Holy Roman Empire. When Nuremberg later appealed for the return of the regalia, the city's requests were easily dismissed by the Austrian Empire.

The Kunsthistorisches Museum has dated the lance to the 8th century. Robert Feather, an English metallurgist and technical engineering writer, tested it for a documentary in January 2003. Based on X-ray diffraction, fluorescence tests, and other noninvasive procedures, he dated the main body of the spear to the 7th century at the earliest. Feather stated in the same documentary that an iron pin – long claimed to be a nail from the crucifixion, hammered into the blade and set off by tiny brass crosses – was "consistent" in length and shape with a 1st-century AD Roman nail.

Not long afterward, researchers at the Interdisciplinary Research Institute for Archeology in Vienna used X-ray and other technology to examine a range of lances, and determined that the Vienna lance dates from around the 8th to the beginning of the 9th century, with the nail apparently being of the same metal, and ruled out the possibility of it dating back to the 1st century AD.

The Hofburg spear has been re-imagined in popular culture as a magical talisman whose powers may be used for good or evil.

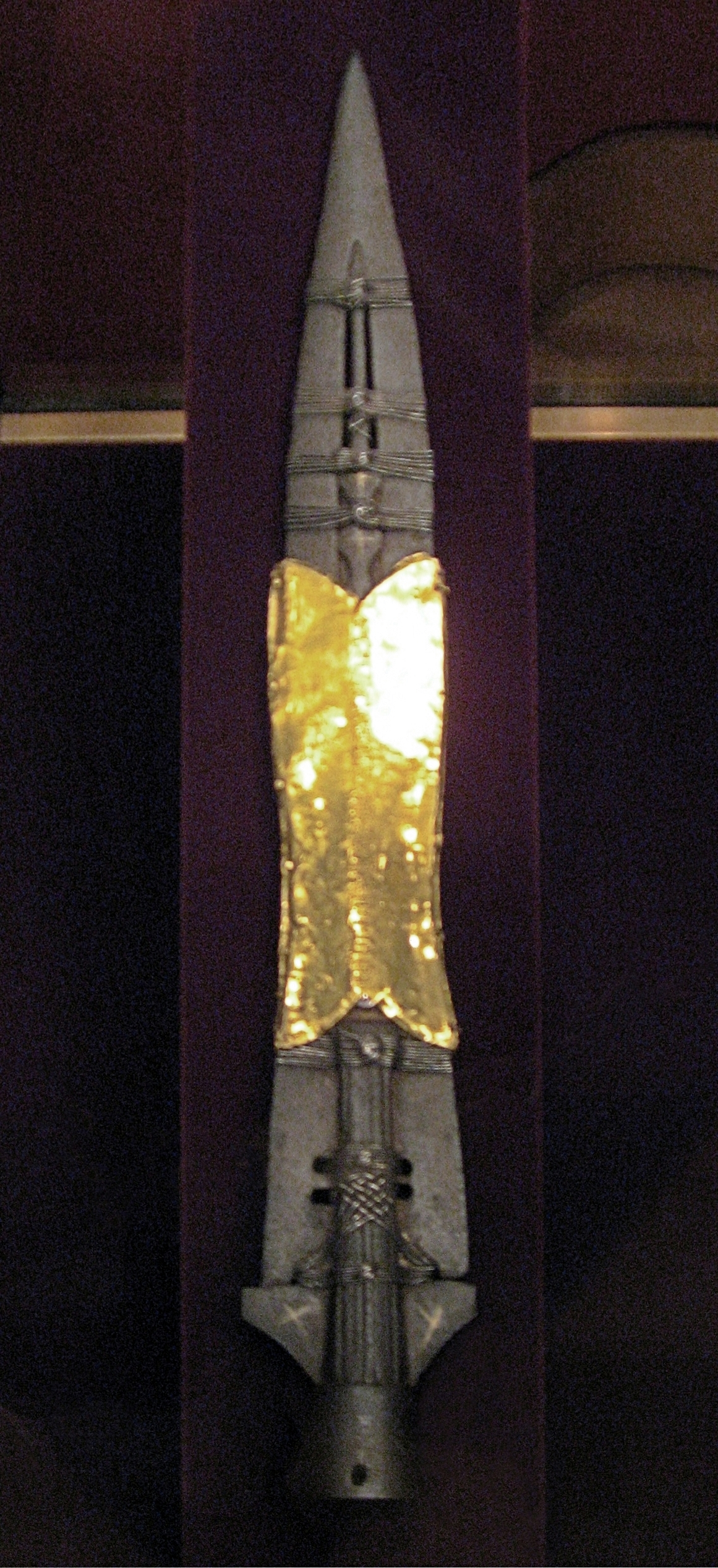
Holy Lance displayed in the Imperial Treasury at the Hofburg Palace in Vienna, Austria

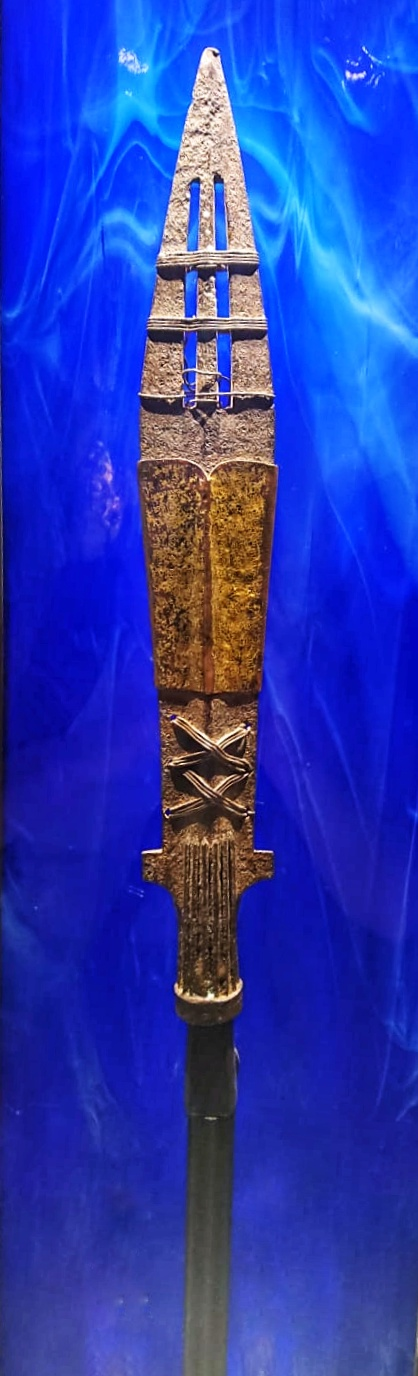
Polish replica of the Holy Lance, Wawel Hill, Kraków

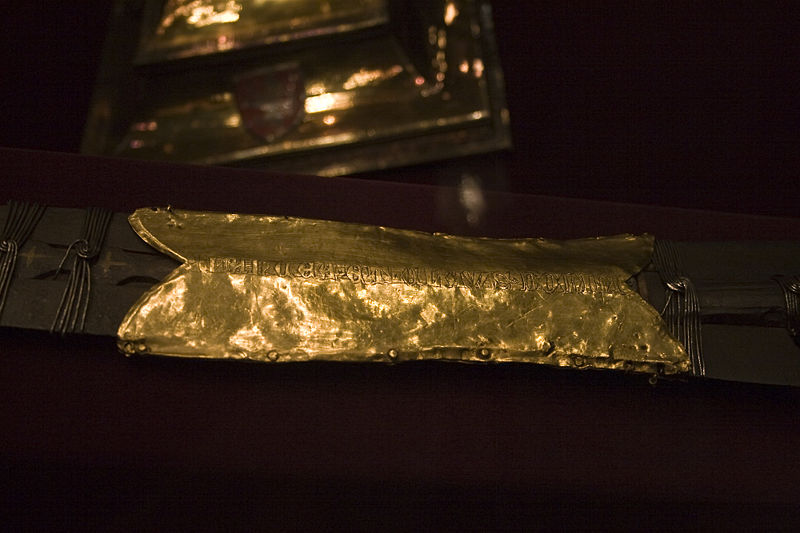
The inscription on the Holy Lance

=== The Holy Lance of Antioch ===
During the First Crusade, when Antioch was besieged in June 1098, Peter Bartholomew reported that he had a vision in which St. Andrew told him that the Holy Lance was buried in the Church of St. Peter in Antioch. After much digging in the cathedral, Bartholomew allegedly discovered a lance. Despite the doubts of many, including the papal legate Adhemar of Le Puy, many of the crusaders credited the discovery of the lance for their subsequent victory in the Battle of Antioch, which broke the siege and secured the city.

Greek Orthodox sources such as the biography of patriarch Christopher indicate that a relic thought to be the Holy Lance was among the treasures of the church of St. Peter as early as the 10th century. Historian Klaus-Peter Todt has suggested this relic could have been buried to hide it from Seljuk forces in 1084, allowing the crusaders to find it in 1098.

During the Siege of Tripoli, Raymond of Toulose reportedly brought the Antioch lance to Constantinople, and presented it to Emperor Alexios I Komnenos. Scholars disagree on how this presumably awkward situation was resolved. Steven Runciman argued that the Byzantine court regarded the Antioch relic as a nail (ἧλος), relying on Raymond's ignorance of the Greek language to avoid offending him. Alternatively, Edgar Robert Ashton Sewter believed that Alexios intended to denounce the crusaders' lance as a fraud, and that this was accomplished when Prince Bohemond I of Antioch was compelled in 1108 to swear an oath to him on the Constantinople lance. Whether Alexios kept the Antioch lance or returned it to Raymond is uncertain. Several 12th century documents state that a single Holy Lance was among the relics at Constantinople, without any details that could identify it as either the crusaders' discovery or the Byzantine spear.

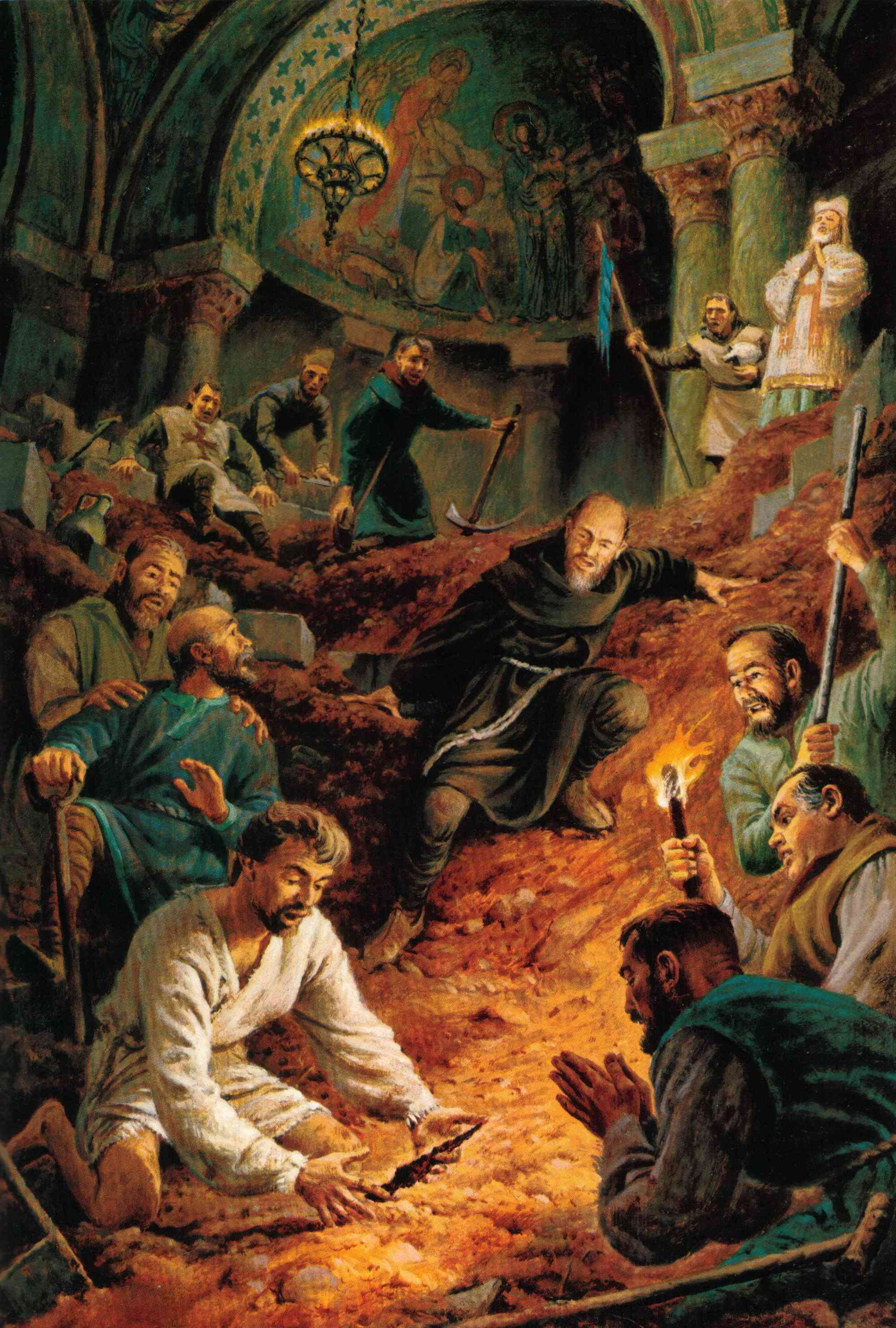
A modern depiction of the Holy Lance's discovery

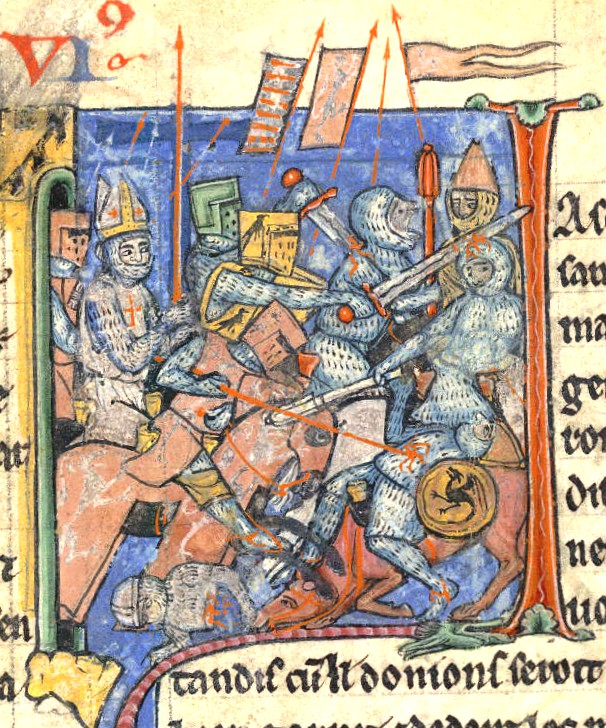
A mitred Adhémar de Monteil carrying the Holy Lance during the First Crusade

=== The Holy Lance of Vagharshapat ===
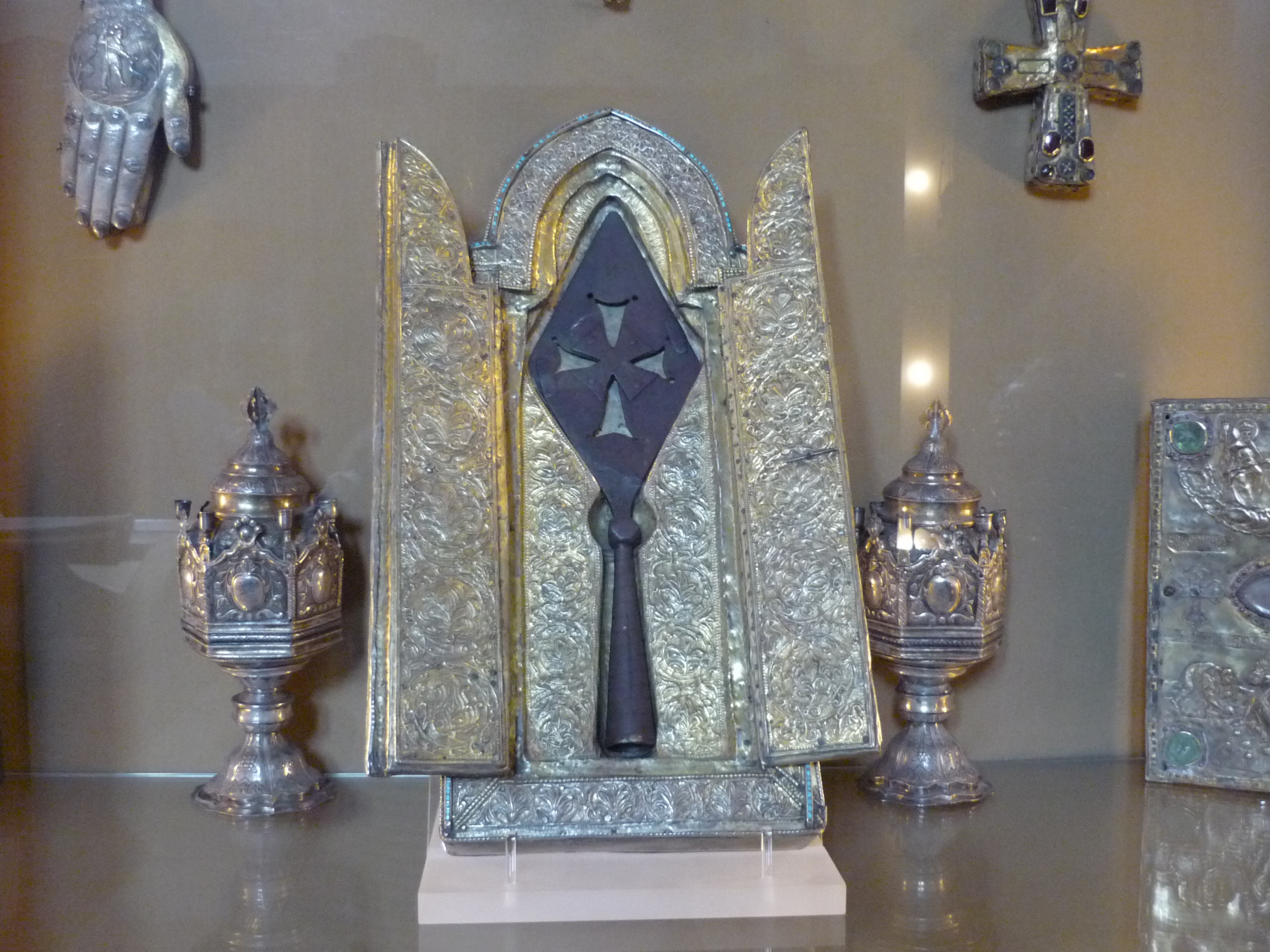
The Holy Lance in Vagharshapat

A Holy Lance is conserved in Vagharshapat (previously known as Echmiadzin), the religious capital of Armenia. It was previously held in the monastery of Geghard.The first source that mentions it is a text Holy Relics of Our Lord Jesus Christ, in a thirteenth-century Armenian manuscript. According to this text, the spear which pierced Jesus was to have been brought to Armenia by the Apostle Thaddeus. The manuscript does not specify precisely where it was kept, but the Holy Relics gives a description that exactly matches the lance, the monastery gate (since the thirteenth century precisely), and the name of Geghardavank (Monastery of the Holy Lance).

In 1655, the French traveler Jean-Baptiste Tavernier was the first Westerner to see this relic in Armenia. In 1805, the Russians captured the monastery and the relic was moved to Tchitchanov Geghard, Tbilisi, Georgia. It was later returned to Armenia, and is still on display at the Manoogian museum in Vagharshapat, enshrined in a 17th-century reliquary. Every year during the commemoration of the apostles St. Thaddeus and St. Bartholomew the relic is brought out for worship.

== Literary ==
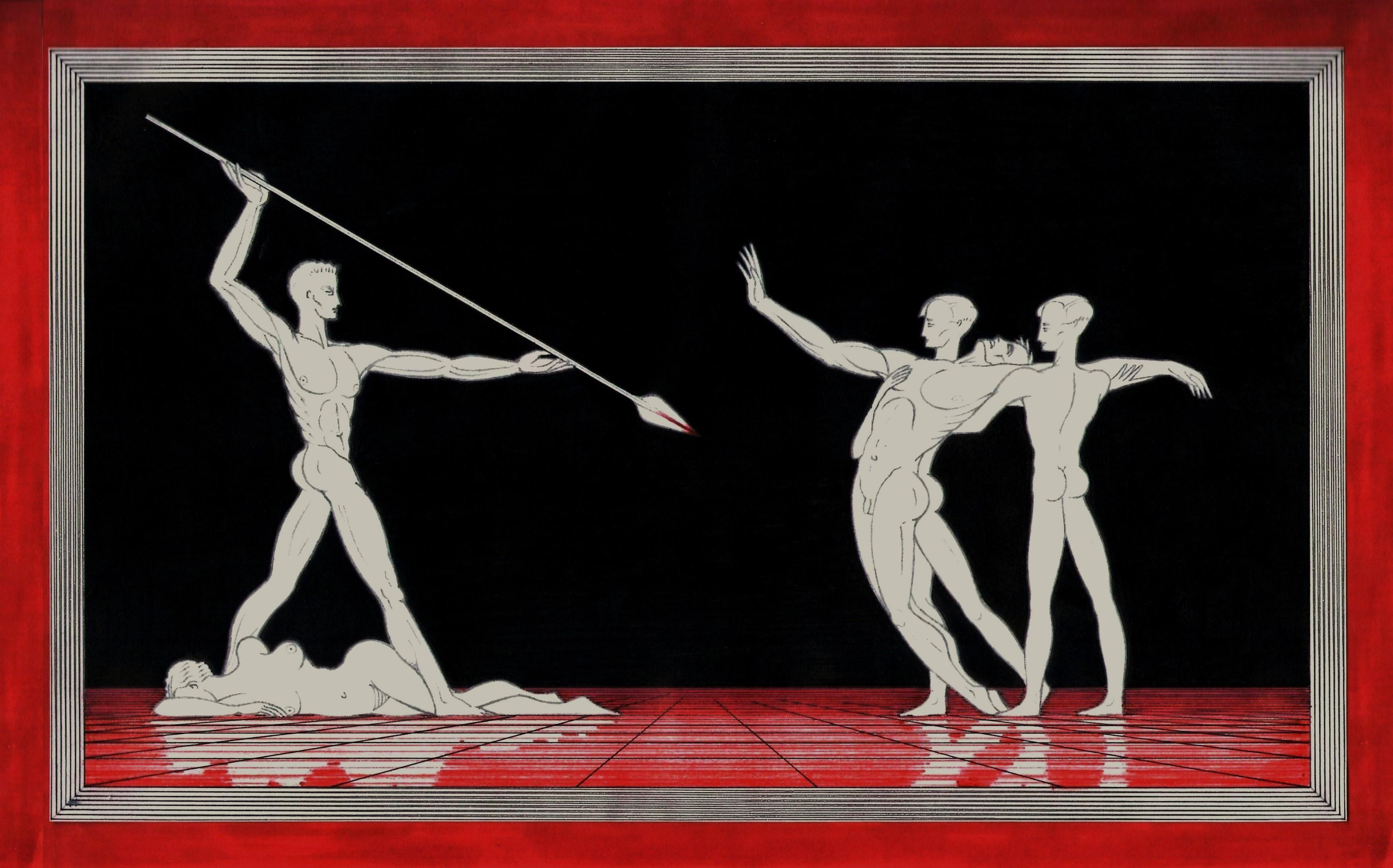
The Holy Lance in Parsifal, Act 3 (by Arnaldo dell'Ira, c. 1930)

The Holy Lance has been conflated with the bleeding lance depicted in the unfinished 12th century romance Perceval, the Story of the Grail by Chrétien de Troyes. The story also refers to a javelot that has wounded the Fisher King, which may or may not be intended to be one and the same with the bleeding lance. Chrétien ascribes supernaturally destructive powers to the bleeding spear, which are inconsistent with any Christian tradition. Nevertheless, the continuations of Chrétien's poem attempted to explain the mysteries of the bleeding spear by identifying it with the lance from John 19:34.

Chrétien's Perceval was adapted by Wolfram von Eschenbach into the German epic Parzival. Like Chrétien, Wolfram depicts the bleeding lance in a manner that cannot easily be reconciled with the spear of Longinus. Parzival became the primary source for Richard Wagner's 1882 opera Parsifal, in which the Fisher King is wounded by the spear that pierced Jesus's side.

== Pop culture ==
In the prequel episode of Wolfenstein 3D, titled Spear of Destiny, B.J. Blazkowicz is sent on a mission to recapture the titular weapon from the Nazis after it had been stolen from Versailles. Two additional episodes were later released where the Spear was stolen twice more to both build a nuclear missile and in the following mission pack, summon demons.

The spear appears in the Indiana Jones franchise, being key to the plot of the comic series Indiana Jones and the Spear of Destiny and also appearing in the film Indiana Jones and the Dial of Destiny, where the protagonist attempts to retrieve it from Nazi control.

In the anime Neon Genesis Evangelion, the Spear of Longinus is the name of a powerful artifact of alien origin. The object pierces the second angel, Lilith, to incapacitate it. It is a key artifact in the plot of The End of Evangelion.

In the game Persona 2: Innocent Sin, the Spear of Longinus is used by Maya Okamura to fatally wound Maya Amano to fulfill the Oracle of Maia, a doomsday prophecy.

It appears in the 2005 film Constantine, where the artifact is found early in the movie having been hidden in Mexico (wrapped in a Nazi flag) after having been lost after World War II.

In the second season of the Arrowverse TV show Legends of Tomorrow (2016–2022), the Holy Lance was a key plot point in which the Legends collected the pieces of the broken spear from across time. Once reconstituted, the spear was then used (in conjunction with the Blood of Christ) by the series antagonists to change reality before the Legends used it again to change reality back.

In the 2014 game The Binding of Isaac: Rebirth, there is an item called the Spear of Destiny, which bears resemblance to the Holy Lance displayed in the Imperial Treasury at the Hofburg Palace in Vienna, Austria.

In the manga One Piece, Saint Rimoshifu Killingham, uses a spear called Longinus, which belonged to the ancestor of the Rimoshifu family.

== See also ==
- Holy Chalice – Vessel that Jesus used at the Last Supper to serve wine
- Holy Sponge – Instrument of the Passion of Jesus Christ
- Image of Edessa – Painting of Jesus Christ's face
- Seamless robe of Jesus – Robe said to have been worn by Jesus before his crucifixion
- True Cross – Relics claimed to be the cross upon which Jesus was crucified

== General and cited references ==
- Kirchweger, Franz, ed. (2005). Die Heilige Lanze in Wien: Insignie, Reliquie, "Schicksalsspeer" [The Holy Lance in Vienna: Insignia, Relic, "Spear of Destiny"] (in German). Vienna: Kunsthistorisches Museum.
- Kirchweger, Franz (2005). "Die Geschichte der Heiligen Lanze vom späteren Mittelalter bis zum Ende des Heiligen Römischen Reiches (1806)" [The History of the Holy Lance from the Later Middle Ages to the End of the Holy Roman Empire (1806)]. Die Heilige Lanze in Wien: Insignie, Reliquie, "Schicksalsspeer" [The Holy Lance in Vienna: Insignia, Relic, "Spear of Destiny"] (in German). Vienna: Kunsthistorisches Museum. pp. 71–110.
- Schier, Volker; Schleif, Corine (2005). "Die heilige und die unheilige Lanze. Von Richard Wagner bis zum World Wide Web" [The Holy and the Unholy Lance. From Richard Wagner to the World Wide Web]. Die Heilige Lanze in Wien: Insignie, Reliquie, "Schicksalsspeer" [The Holy Lance in Vienna: Insignia, Relic, "Spear of Destiny"] (in German). Vienna: Kunsthistorisches Museum. pp. 110–143 – via Academia.edu.
- Schier, Volker; Schleif, Corine (2004). "Seeing and Singing, Touching and Tasting the Holy Lance. The Power and Politics of Embodied Religious Experiences in Nuremberg, 1424–1524.". In Petersen, Nils Holger; Cluver, Claus; Bell, Nicolas (eds.). Signs of Change. Transformations of Christian Traditions and their Representation in the Arts, 1000–2000. Amsterdam; New York: Rodopi. pp. 401–426 – via Academia.edu.
- Sheffy, Lester Fields (1915). Use of the Holy Lance in the First Crusade (Thesis). University of Texas.
