= Planned obsolescence (disambiguation) =

Planned obsolescence is the policy of deliberately manufacturing a product with a limited lifespan.

Planned obsolescence may also refer to:

== Other uses ==
- Planned Obsolescence (book), a 2011 book
- Planned Obsolescence (album), by The Blues Project, 1968
- Planned Obsolescence (BoJack Horseman), a 2018 episode of BoJack Horseman
- Planned Obsolescence, a song by French metal band Gojira from their 2012 album L'Enfant Sauvage.
