= St. Longin's Rotunda =

Coordinates: 50.0765°N 14.4256°E

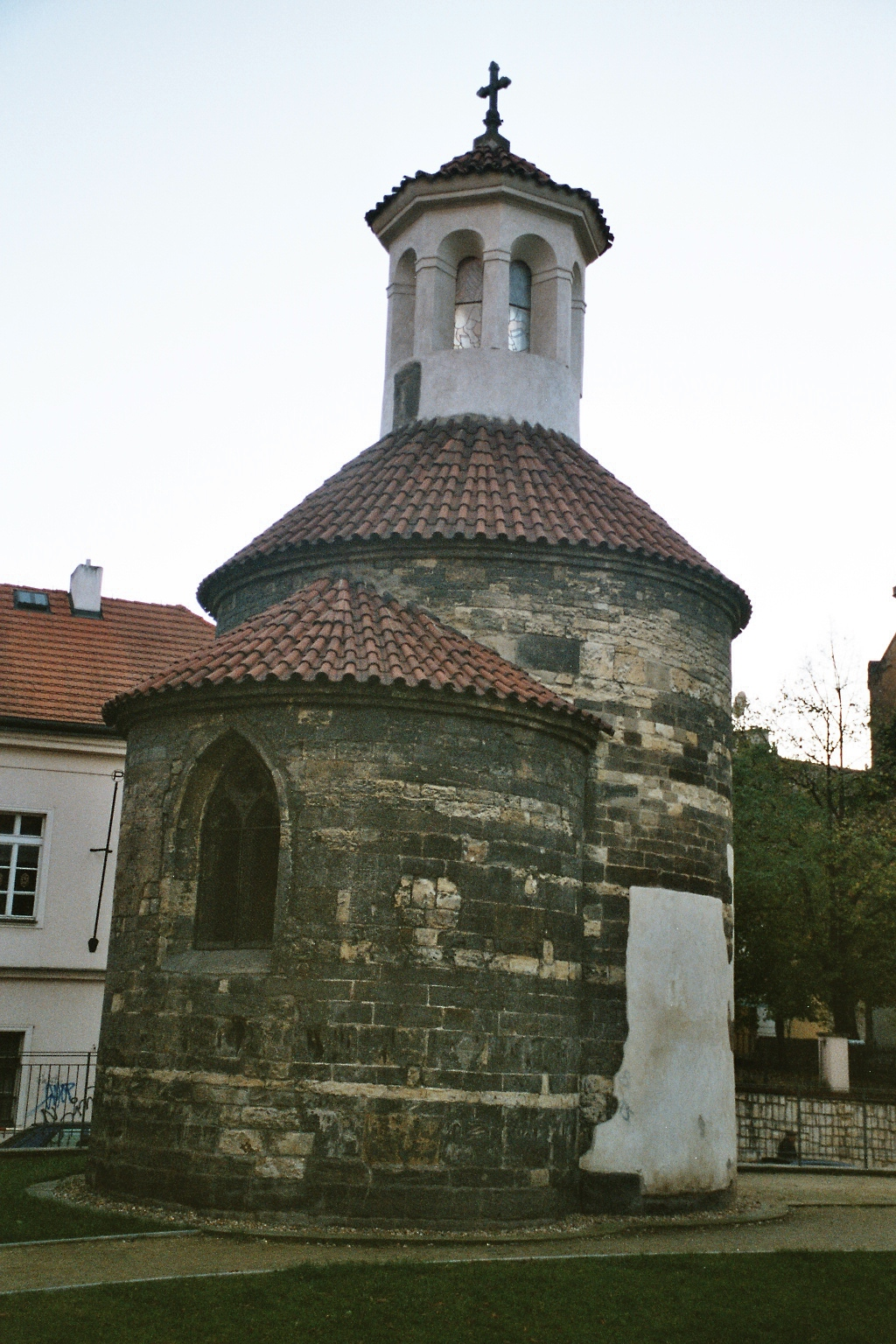
St. Longin's Rotunda, Prague

St. Longin's Rotunda (Prague, Na Rybníčku) (Czech: Rotunda svatého Longina) is one of the few preserved romanesque rotundas in Prague, in the Czech Republic. It was founded in the 12th century as a parish church for a village called "Rybníček" which was there before the founding of the Prague New Town in the middle of the 14th century.

Originally, it was a Pagan temple before the arrival of Christianity, when it was transformed into a Catholic chapel. Up until the 14th century, it was consecrated to St Stephen, before Charles IV founded the New Town and changed the consecration to Saint Longinus, who was one of the men who took part in Jesus' crucifixion, and supposedly pierced the side of Jesus. Longinus came to deeply regret this action, causing him to desert the army and become a hermit, later leading to his arrest and execution.

The rotunda was nearly demolished in the 19th century while the nearby street (Na Rybníčku) was being built, but it was saved by František Palacký.

== See also ==
- List of Romanesque architecture#Czech Republic
