= Richard Price (businessman) =

British entrepreneur

- Education: St Catherine's College, Oxford
- Occupations: Entrepreneur, business executive
- Known for: Founder and CEO, Academia.edu
- Website: oxford.academia.edu/RichardPrice

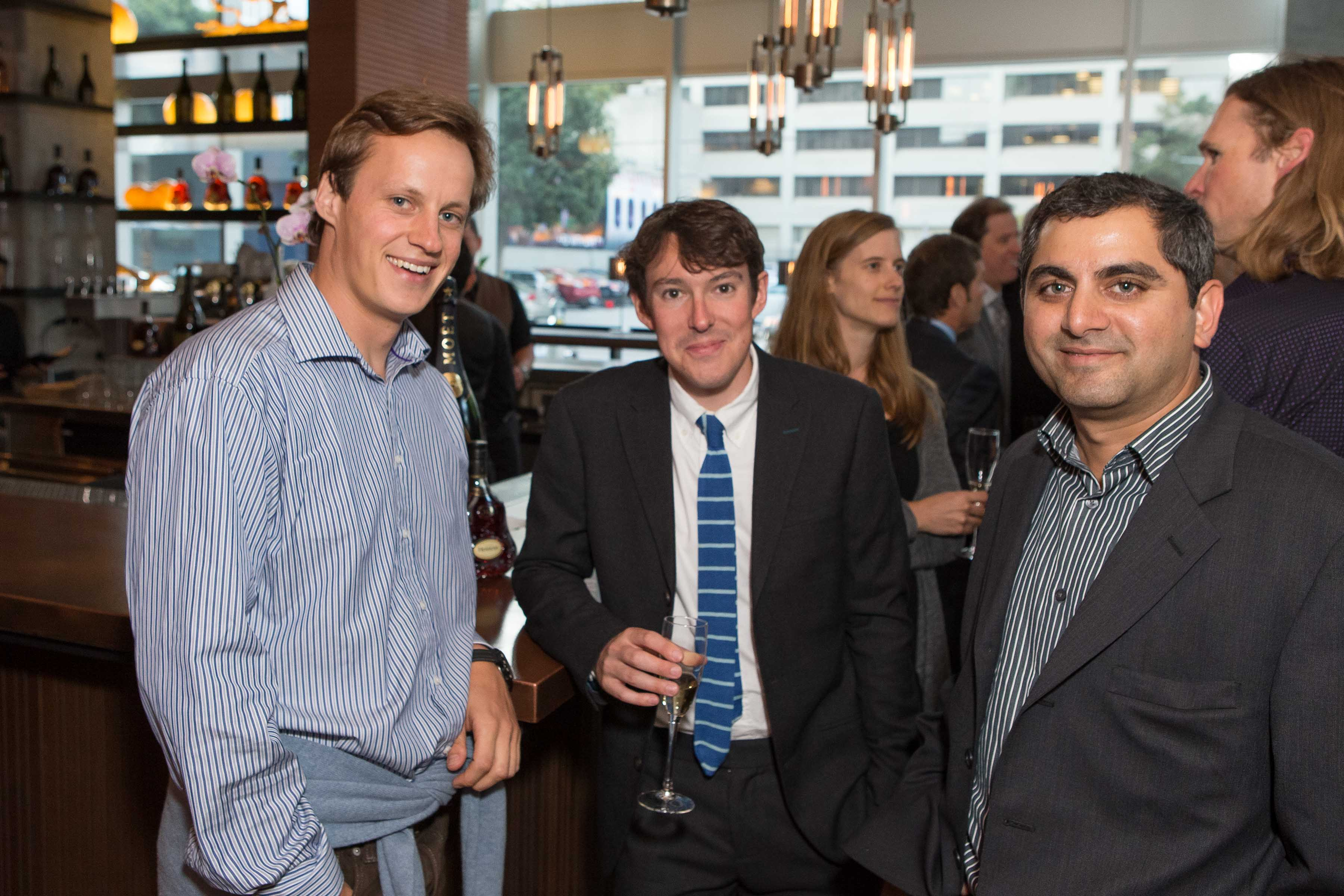
Richard Price (left)

Richard Price is an English entrepreneur and the founder of Academia.edu, a for-profit academic social network and open-access publishing website.

== Career ==
Price was born and raised in England and attended the University of Oxford, studying Philosophy, politics and economics at St. Catherine's College, continuing with a BPhil and DPhil in Philosophy. Price was awarded a prize fellowship of All Souls College in 2004. During his time at Oxford, Price started "Richard's Banana Bakery", a banana cake delivery service for cafes before starting "Dashing Lunches", which sold sandwiches to consumers directly. He also founded LiveOut, a database of student rental properties in Oxford. In 2006, he created a Facebook application that allowed people to rate their friends' photos, which was Facebook's top app for nine months.

After graduating from Oxford, Price became frustrated with the time it took to get his work peer-reviewed and published and decided to create a platform in which academics could publish, peer review, and distribute their work. In 2007, Price raised $600,000 from London-based venture capitalists and moved to San Francisco, California, where he officially launched Academia.edu in September 2008. In 2014, the Academia.edu website had over 10 million registered users who uploaded more than 2.9 million papers. By 2016, the company had raised $17.7 million in funding.
