= Academia.edu =

Academic research sharing website

Academia, Inc.

- Screenshot
- Company type: Private
- Website type: Platform for sharing research papers
- Available in: English
- Founded: 2008; 18 years ago
- Headquarters: San Francisco, California, U.S.
- Area served: Worldwide
- Founder: Richard Price
- Employees: 100
- Website: academia.edu
- Registration: Required
- Users: 300 million

Academia.edu is a commercial platform for sharing academic research that is uploaded and distributed by researchers from around the world. All academic articles are free to read by visitors, however uploading and downloading articles is restricted to registered users, with additional features accessible only as a paid subscription.

Since the launch of the site in 2008, the number of users has grown rapidly, reaching about 10 million daily visits in early 2022. By 2026, Academia.edu has over 300 million registered users, with over 55 million papers currently available on the platform.

In 2022, the company entered the scientific publishing sector, launching a dozen scientific, open access journals, and publishing under the name of "Academia.edu Journals".

== History ==
Academia.edu was founded by Richard Price in 2008.

On its filings with the Securities and Exchange Commission, the company uses the legal name Academia Inc. The site was registered in the .edu top-level domain in 1999 when that domain was not limited to educational institutions.

Academia.edu supports the open science or open access movements and, in particular, instant distribution of research. Accordingly, the company publicly stated its opposition to the proposed (since withdrawn) 2011 U.S. Research Works Act, which would have prevented open-access mandates in the U.S.

In 2013, Elsevier sent thousands of takedown notices to Academia.edu, claiming copyright infringement for Elsevier-published content that was posted on Academia.edu. Following widespread complaint of these takedown notices by researchers, scientist, former non-tenure track and part-time professors, who had no more access to publish on their university accounts, Elsevier retracted their request, and academics were allowed to continue to post their publications.

== Competitors ==
Academia.edu's competitors include ResearchGate, Springer and Mendeley. In 2016, Academia.edu reportedly had more registered users than ResearchGate (about 34 million versus 11 million) and higher web traffic, but ResearchGate had substantially more active usage by researchers. In 2020, the traffic ranks had reversed, with ResearchGate ranked in the top 150–200 websites globally according to Alexa Internet, whereas Academia.edu was positioned in the 200–300 range. Unpaywall, which collects data about open access versions of academic publications and provides easy access to them, is also considered a competitor to Academia.edu.

== Publishing ==
As of August 2026, Academia.edu Journals has launched 21 active open-access journals that publish articles in various scientific fields, including medicine. As an open-access publisher, all articles are freely available.

All journals waived article processing charges for authors during the year in which the journal was launched, and continue to waive these fees for authors who come from eligible countries or can prove difficulty with paying due to lack of funding.

Currently, the following journals are published:

Title	ISSN	Launch
Academia AI and Applications	3071-0286	2025, September
Academia Biology	2837-4010	2023, March
Academia Biomedical Engineering	Pending	2026, July
Academia Catalysis	3143-5408	2025, October
Academia Drug Development and Pharmacotherapy	3071-2521	2025, August
Academia Earth and Planetary Science	3143-6692	2026, February
Academia Engineering	2994-7065	2023, June
Academia Environmental Sciences and Sustainability	2997-6006	2023, November
Academia Global and Public Health	3071-0324	2025, December
Academia Green Energy	2998-3665	2023, August
Academia Immunity and Disease	3143-0481	2025, August
Academia Materials Science	2997-2027	2023, October
Academia Medical Imaging and Radiation Therapy	Pending	2026, April
Academia Medicine and Health	3070-3530	2023, June
Academia Mental Health and Well-Being	2997-9196	2023, December
Academia Molecular Biology and Genomics	3064-9765	2024, May
Academia Nano: Science, Materials, Technology	3065-9736	2024, March
Academia Neuroscience and Brain Research	3071-4087	2025, September
Academia Nutrition and Dietetics	3067-1345	2024, November
Academia Oncology	2998-7741	2024, February
Academia Quantum	3064-979X	2024, May

=== Indexing of journals ===
As of August 2026, Academia.edu Journals has multiple journals indexed in databases, including:

==== Scopus ====
Academia Biology (eISSN: 2837-4010) is indexed in Scopus, with a 2025 Citescore of 1.0.

==== Web of Science ====
Academia Biology (eISSN: 2837-4010) is indexed in three subspecialty databases of Web of Science — BIOSIS previews, Biological Abstracts, and Zoological Record.

==== Embase ====
Three journals, Academia Mental Health and Well-Being (eISSN: 2997-9196), Academia Oncology (eISSN: 2998-7741), and Academia Medicine and Health (eISSN: 3070-3530) are indexed in the biomedical database Embase.

==== DOAJ ====
12 journals are indexed in the Directory of Open Access Journals (DOAJ).

== Criticism ==
=== Criticism of Company Name ===
Academia.edu is not a university or institution for higher learning and so under current standards it would not qualify for the ".edu" top-level domain. However, since the domain name "Academia.edu" was registered in 1999, before the regulations required .edu domain names to be held solely by accredited post-secondary institutions in the US, it is allowed to remain active and operational. All .edu domain names registered before 2001 were grandfathered in, even if not an accredited USA post-secondary institution.

=== 2015 and 2016 Complaints ===
In 2015, a critic, Kathleen Fitzpatrick, the director of scholarly communication at the Modern Language Association, said she found the use of the ".edu" domain name by Academia.edu to be "extremely problematic", since it might mislead users into thinking the site is part of an accredited educational institution rather than a for-profit company.

In early 2016, some users reported having received e-mails from Academia.edu where they were asked if they would be interested in paying a fee to have their papers recommended by the website's editors. This led some users to start a campaign encouraging users to cancel their Academia.edu accounts. In December 2016, Academia.edu announced new premium features that includes data analytics on work and the professional rank of the viewers, which have also received criticism.

Other criticisms in 2016 include the fact that Academia.edu uses a vendor lock-in model: "It's up to Academia.edu to decide what you can and can't do with the information you've given them, and they're not likely to make it easy for alternative methods to access". This is in reference to the fact that, although papers can be read by non-users, a free account is needed in order to download papers: "you need to be logged in to do most of the useful things on the site (even as a casual reader)". According to a now deleted post, the University of Oklahoma libraries states that when interacting with Academia.edu, users should keep in mind that "you are not the customer," but rather "you are the product that these services seek to monetize and/or 'offer up' to advertisers," that "you might be breaking the law," even if you are uploading your own work, and finally that "there are privacy implications," because a commercial site does not follow professional standards and "may share information about you".

== Reputation ==
Academia.edu has repeatedly been the target of public criticism for using manipulative interface mechanisms classified as “dark patterns.” Users’ main complaints concern unfair subscription practices: one-time offers to purchase individual documents often mask a transition to high-cost annual plans without providing adequate and conspicuous information to the consumer. This strategy, where key financial terms are presented in visually muted text with low contrast, is viewed as a violation of transaction transparency principles and consumer protection standards. The widespread nature of negative reviews on independent platforms such as Trustpilot and Reddit has created a persistent negative reputation for the service, leading to numerous chargeback procedures and discussions regarding the company’s compliance with the California Automatic Renewal Law (ARL) and the EU Digital Services Directive.
