= John Paul II Cathedral Museum =

Museum in Kraków, Poland

Coordinates: 50°03′17″N 19°56′05″E

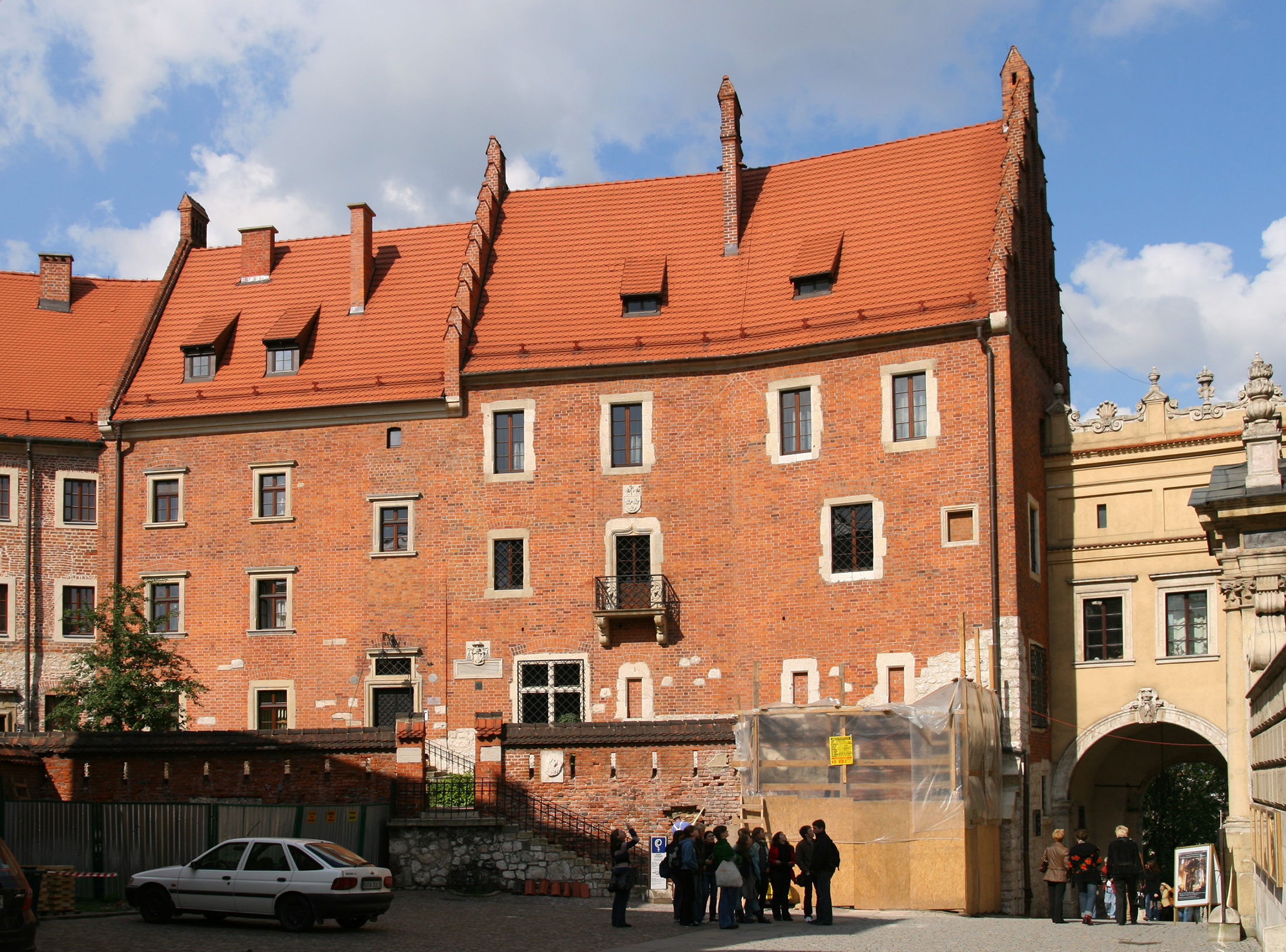
John Paul II Cathedral Museum

The John Paul II Cathedral Museum (Polish: Muzeum Katedralne imienia Jana Pawła II) is a museum in Kraków, Poland. It is situated on Wawel Hill, between the Vasa Gate and the former seat of the Castle Seminary, in the Cathedral House, which is composed of two 14th-century buildings.

== History ==
In 1906, Cardinal Jan Puzyna established the diocesan museum in the buildings. In 1975, cardinal Karol Wojtyla, future Pope John Paul II, decided to transform it into a cathedral museum, where objects from the Wawel Cathedral would be kept and exposed.

On 28 September 1978, on the 20th anniversary of the day he was anointed as bishop, Cardinal Karol Wojtyła ceremonially opened and blessed the Wawel Cathedral Museum, which was to be his last official duty at Wawel before he became pope.

== Exposition ==
The cathedral museum exhibition presents the most precious objects which were kept in the cathedral treasury: the oldest Polish regalia, handicraft, clothes, paintings and sculptures, as well as the memorabilia related to Pope John Paul II.

The exhibits are organized according to their historical and artistic value, and exhibited in four rooms:

- Royal Room - houses the regalia and gifts of the Polish monarchs for the cathedral: St Maurice's spear, the coronation mantle of king Stanisław August Poniatowski, the coronation sword of king Augustus III, the Golden Rose of queen Maria Josepha, the crown, sceptre and orb of king Casimir IV, the rationale of bishops of Kraków.
- Cathedral Threasury Room (11th – 16th century) - houses the collection of objects donated to the cathedral by kings, bishops and aristocrats: the silver box (known as a “Saracene-Sicilian case”), the chasuble donated by Cracow Voivode, Piotr Kmita, objects found in the grave of bishop Maurus (silver chalice and patena, a golden ring, a bone bead and a lead tablet), Hedwig glass as well as the slabs from an 11th-century stone building.
- Cathedral Threasury Room (17th – 20th century) – monstrance of bishop Stanisław Dąmbski, mitre of Bishop Andrzej Lipski, the collection of chalices of bishops of Kraków, crosier of Bishop Adam Stefan Sapieha, sabre, portrait and orders of Prince Józef Poniatowski.
- Papal Room – contains the memorabilia related to Pope John Paul II: papal clothes (cassocks, biretta, zucchetto and sash), mitre handed over to the cathedral during the papal visit in Poland, armchair used by John Paul II and Benedict XVI during their visits in the cathedral, goblet made of coconut and silver (presented to the Museum by cardinal Wojtyla, on its opening day).
