= Saint Longinus (Bernini) =

Sculpture by Gianlorenzo Bernini

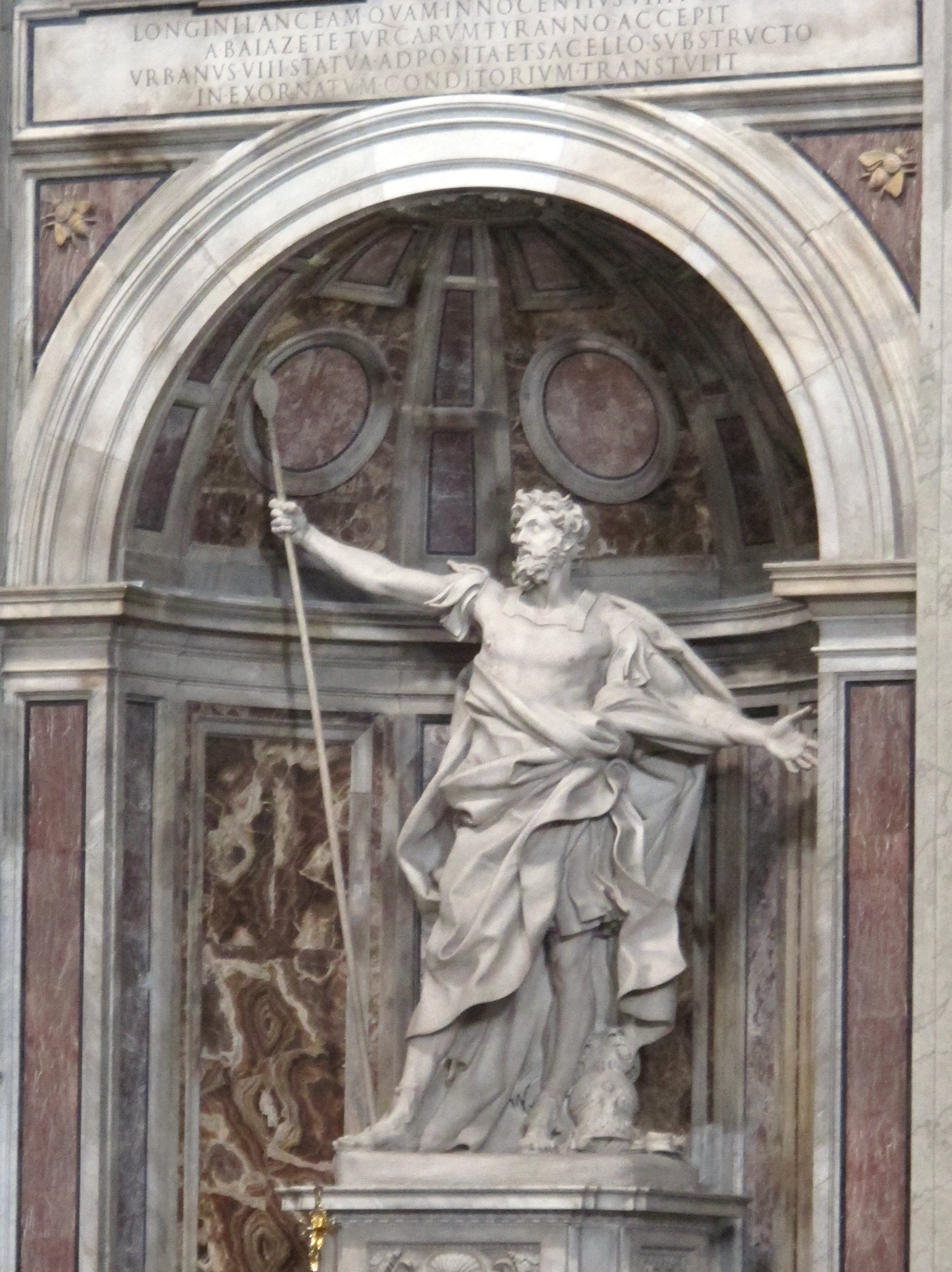
- Artist: Gian Lorenzo Bernini
- Year: 1629–1638
- Catalogue: 28
- Type: Sculpture
- Medium: Marble
- Subject: Saint Longinus
- Dimensions: 440 cm × 440 cm (170 in × 174 in)
- Location: St. Peter's Basilica, Vatican City

Saint Longinus is a saint honored by a sculpture by the Italian artist Gian Lorenzo Bernini. Completed in 1638, the marble sculpture sits in the north-eastern niche in the crossing of St. Peter's Basilica in Vatican City. It is over four meters (13 ft) high and was commissioned by Pope Urban VIII, a great patron of Bernini.

== Commission ==
In 1627 Bernini replaced Carlo Maderno as the chief architect for St. Peter's Basilica and was given complete control over any new projects in St. Peter's until 1647, three years after the Pope's death. Bernini not only oversaw the addition of interior decoration in St. Peter's but he was responsible for the creation of several works, including Saint Longinus.

Saint Longinus was one of four massive statues commissioned for the niches under the crossing of St Peter's, along with statues of St Andrew, St Helen, and St Veronica, all of whom have relics associated with them in the basilica. Small models were created by various artists, including one of St Andrew by Bernini. After various discussions with the committee selecting the works, Bernini was then appointed to create St Longinus. Bernini was paid 3,300 Roman scudi for the work, the same as each of the other sculptors producing statues for the niche.

== Preparatory studies ==
It is likely that the early bozzetto (a rough model made in terracotta), held in the Fogg Art Museum and dated to ca. 1631, was done by Bernini as he continued to work through various concepts for the final statue. However, the design used in the Harvard bozzetto was not the one used in the final statue; changes to the Baldacchino—the immense four pillared arch built in the centre of the crossing—influenced the Longinus design. "Instead of a figure of the Risen Christ," CD Dickerson writes, "the Baldacchino was now to carry a simple globe and cross. Therefore, as Bernini grasped, it no longer made sense for the Longinus to be looking up at the Baldacchino in a worshipful pose."

A later terracotta sketch, held in the Museo di Roma, and rescued during excavation in the 1980s, is closer to the final design. The Museo di Roma model has been cut up into various pieces; the places of the cuts (along the right arm, drapery and torso) are the same as the divisions in the marble block on the final sculpture. This indicates Bernini used the model to calculate how the various blocks of marble could be brought together to form a physically robust and seemingly complete whole.

Bernini and his assistants are likely to have produced many more preparatory designs. The German artist Joachim von Sandrart counted 22 small models for Saint Longinus when he visited Bernini's studio in 1635. Additionally, there are another set of eight drawings in the Düsseldorf Museum Kunstpalast. Once the model had been agreed by the relevant parties, Bernini set to work on the sculpture, taking three years to produce the final design.

== Historical context ==
Begun in 1545, the Council of Trent impacted the content of religious art throughout sixteenth and seventeenth century. The Council of Trent, which reaffirmed basic Catholic doctrine in response to the Protestant Reformation, clarified what elements should be considered in all religious artwork. It was determined religious artwork should depict key aspects of Catholic doctrine, including the saints and sacraments. The art produced during this time was supposed to be clear, accurate, show decorum, and have emotional accessibility. In creating any religious work of art, including Saint Longinus, these guidelines were to be followed.

== Religious context ==
Longinus was the blind Roman soldier who speared Jesus in the side during the crucifixion. He was alleged to have converted to Christianity after the event, having realized Jesus was the son of God. When converting to Christianity, Longinus was cured of his blindness and regained his sight, experiencing not only a spiritual awakening but a physical one as well.

== Composition ==
Bernini captures the moment when Longinus experiences his spiritual awakening. His face looks up towards the sky with a partially open mouth to indicate his spiritual awakening. The Holy Lance is thrust to the side and his armor and military apparatus lay behind him, a symbol of his revocation of his career as a Roman soldier. Longinus, with his arms extended, receives the divine light. This divine light, in practice, would come through the windows of St. Peter's Basilica.

== Artistic style ==
Bernini is known for using intense emotion to communicate a psychological or spiritual awakening in his subject. The way in which he depicted a subject's fabric was often manipulated by Bernini to enhance the drama of the scene. Longinus's clothes twist and billow around him with great intensity, acting as a visual representation of Longinus's spiritual moment converting to Christianity. The billowing fabric also suggests another important trait of Baroque sculpture and Bernini's work, namely movement. Bernini has composed the scene as if the viewer has stumbled upon Longinus, frozen in time at the exact moment of his spiritual transformation. The fabric, depicted in what would otherwise be an unrealistic placement, suggests movement and that the viewer has just stumbled upon Longinus in his exact moment of spiritual awakening.

Bernini has also elevated the drama of the scene by manipulating the construction of the sculpture to create sharp contrasts between light and dark. An iconic visual element of the Baroque era is chiaroscuro, or the contrast between light and dark, which served to heighten the drama of a scene. Bernini uses two techniques in this sculpture to facilitate this contrast and add more drama to the scene. Using a claw chisel, Bernini has created large and small linear patterns across the sculpture, or hatching effect commonly seen in drawings. Areas of the sculpture, especially in the fabric, are also heavily undercut to create pockets of shadow. These two techniques create more darker shadows in the sculpture that are juxtaposed against the bright white marble, thus enhancing the dramatic effect of light and shade.

=== Physiognomy ===
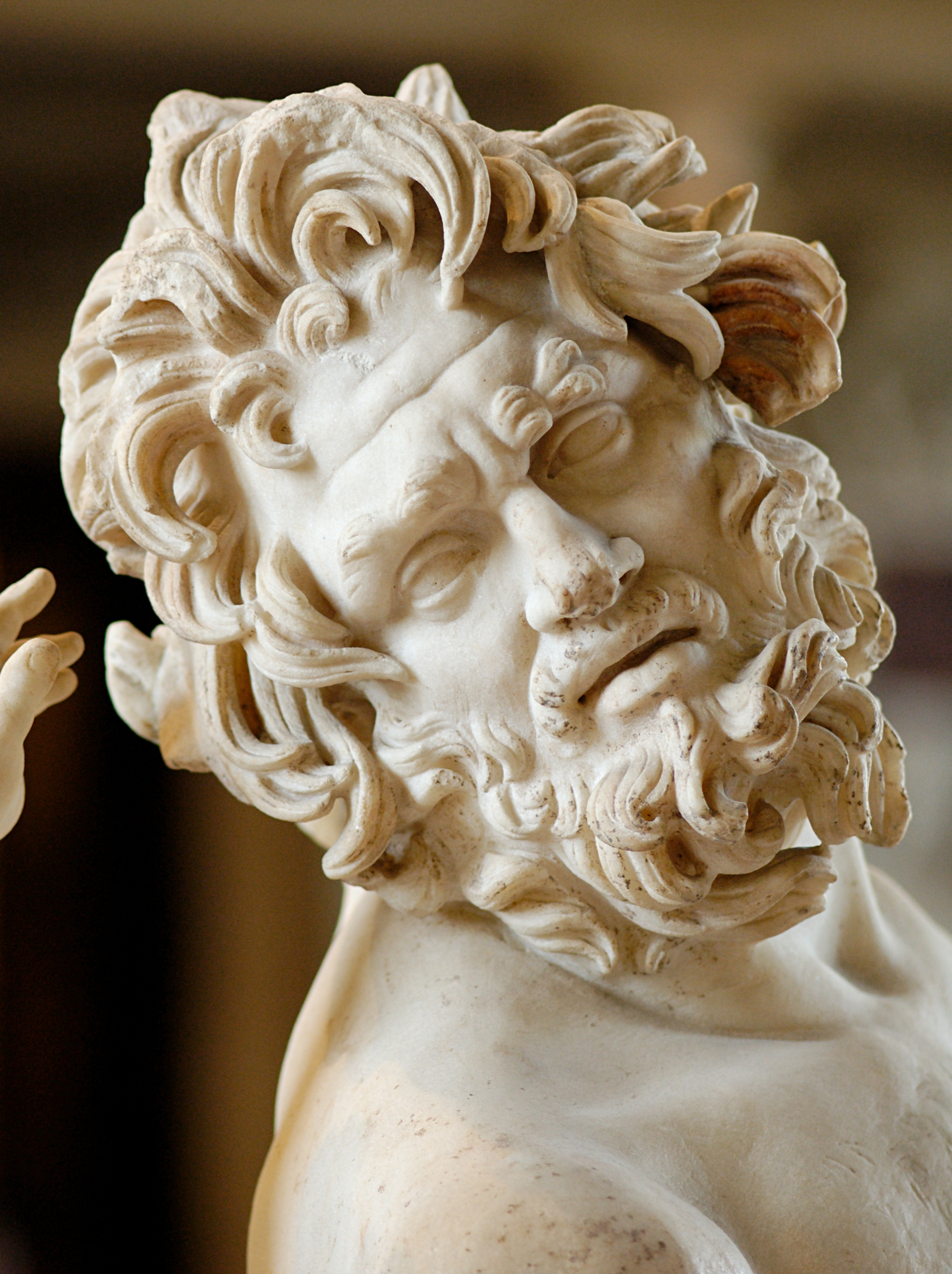
Old Centaur teased by Eros (or Centauro Borghese), Louvre

Manipulating a subject's facial expression to depict their inner feelings and personality was a common technique employed by Bernini and other Baroque artists. In 1593, Italian iconographer Cesare Ripa published Iconologia, a book dealing with the idea of physiognomy. Physiognomy was a popular concept throughout the early seventeenth century and was heavily employed by Baroque artists. Longinus's upward glancing eyes and his parted mouth is an example of physiognomy. The expression of his face is meant to symbolize his inner feelings, specifically his spiritual enlightenment. The head is undoubtedly imitated by a Hellenistic model, the Borghese centaur (Louvre). This technique can also be seen in Bernini's Ecstasy of Saint Theresa, where Saint Theresa looks up to the sky with her mouth partly open, similar to what is seen in Saint Longinus.

=== References to Catholic Christianity ===
When Longinus pierced the side of Christ both blood and water came from the wound. The mixing of blood and water symbolizes the sacraments of the Eucharist and baptism, two important components of the Catholic faith during the Counter-Reformation. By depicting Longinus with the lance, Bernini is referencing these two important Catholic beliefs.

== Later engravings ==
An engraving by H Frezza, created in 1696, exists in the Wellcome Library, London.
