= Kathleen Fitzpatrick (American academic) =

American scholar of digital humanities

- Education: Louisiana State University; New York University
- Occupation: Director of Scholarly Communication
- Organization: Modern Language Association

Kathleen Fitzpatrick is an American scholar of digital humanities and media studies. She is the Director of Digital Humanities and Professor of English at Michigan State University.

Fitzpatrick has previously served as an Associate Executive Director and Director of Scholarly Communication of the Modern Language Association, Visiting Research Professor of English at New York University, co-editor of MediaCommons, and managing editor of PMLA. She was Professor of Media Studies at Pomona College from 1998 to 2013.

== Biography ==
Fitzpatrick received her B.A. and M.F.A from Louisiana State University and her Ph.D. from New York University.

Fitzpatrick is the author of Planned Obsolescence: Publishing, Technology and the Future of the Academy (New York University Press, 2011), which was released for open peer review by MediaCommons Press in 2009. She is also the author of The Anxiety of Obsolescence (Vanderbilt University Press, 2006). Her other publications include articles on the online peer-review platform MediaCommons: "MediaCommons: Scholarly Publishing in the Age of the Internet" and "CommentPress: New (Social) Structures for New (Networked) Texts."

Fitzpatrick has written extensively on critical issues concerning the rise of digital humanities. She contributed two articles to the 2012 print edition of Debates In The Digital Humanities (University of Minnesota Press, 2012), a compilation of writings on the theory, methodologies and pedagogy of the digital humanities. Seeking to address ongoing concerns within this growing field, the book is now open-access and interactive, allowing the discussion to continue. Kathleen Fitzpatrick's contributions to the collection are “The Humanities, Done Digitally”, and “Beyond Metrics: Community Authorization and Open Peer Review”.

== Publications ==
=== Generous Thinking ===
In her book, Generous Thinking: The University and the Public Good (2018), Kathleen Fitzpatrick explores the "ways that scholars might connect and communicate with a range of off-campus communities about our shared interests and concerns."

=== Planned Obsolescence ===
In her book Planned Obsolescence (2011), Kathleen Fitzpatrick describes the technological crisis facing scholarly work within the context of digital communication. She explores the relationship between digital communication and the future of academic publishing, and argues for a new way of working that would give equal weight to online and print publications. A Choice Outstanding Academic Title for 2013, Fitzpatrick's describes the multiple stresses facing scholarly publishing and promotes a new model for peer review, peer-to-peer review, on online platforms such as MediaCommons where authors can invite their peers or the public to comment on their work. Before publishing her book with NYU Press in 2011, Fitzpatrick's manuscript was open to comments online.

=== MediaCommons ===
Kathleen Fitzpatrick is co-editor of MediaCommons, an online community network in media studies which seeks to promote new forms of publishing and transform what it means to "publish." It does more than simply move text from page to screen, MediaCommons highlights the process as much as the product. MediaCommons was founded with the support of The Institute For the Future of the Book and the National Endowment for the Humanities.

== See also ==
- Digital Humanities
- Academic publishing
- Peer review
- Digital collaboration
- Modern Language Association
