= Longinus =

Roman soldier who pierced Jesus

Saint Longinus the Centurion
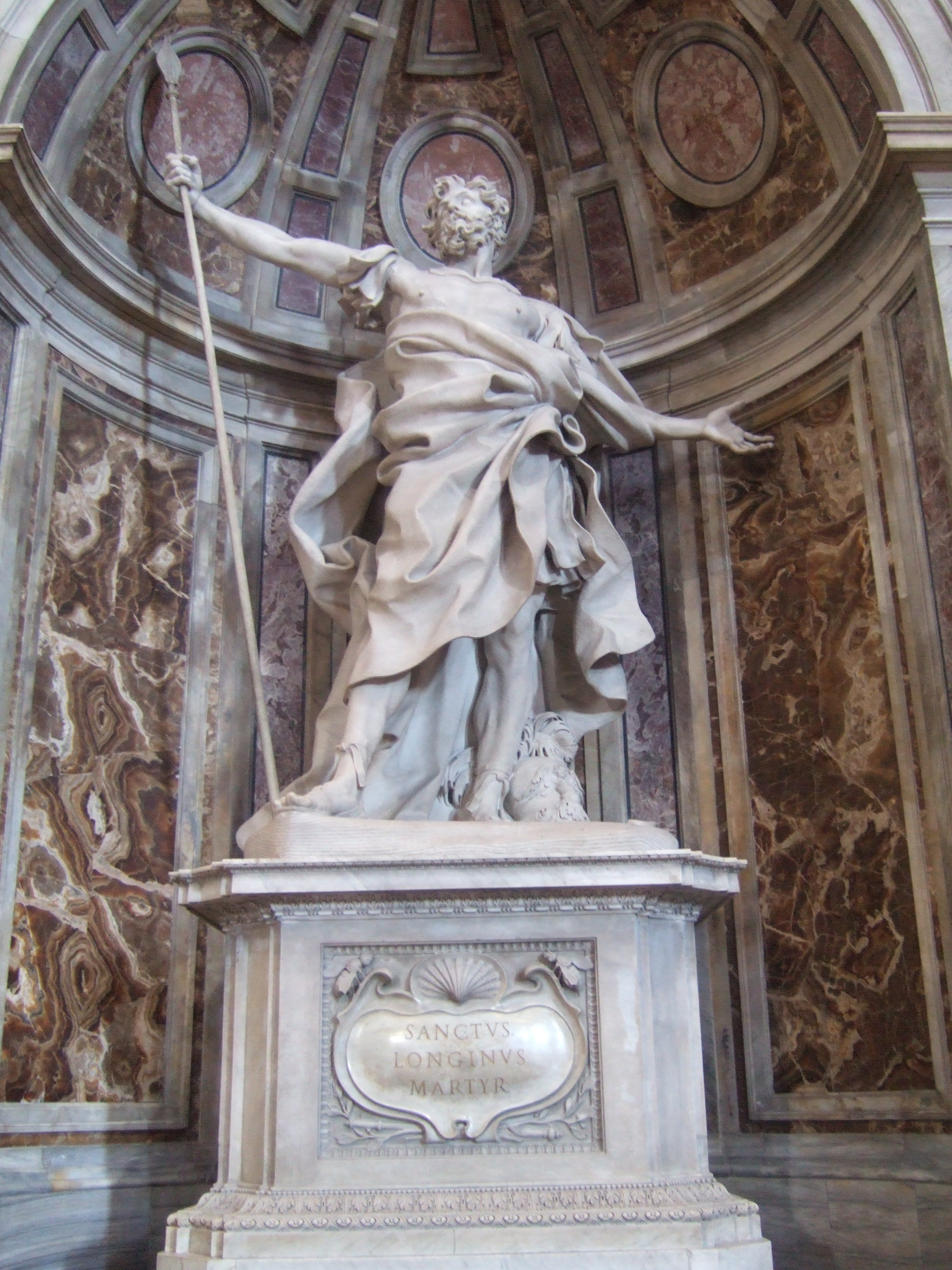
- Statue of Saint Longinus by Bernini in Saint Peter's Basilica
- Born: 1st century Sandiale or Sandrales of Cappadocia
- Died: 1st century Mantua, Italy, Roman Empire
- Venerated in: Anglican Communion; Eastern Orthodox Church; Oriental Orthodoxy; Catholic Church
- Major shrine: Inside St. Peter's Basilica, Vatican City
- Feast: March 15: Roman Catholic Church (pre-1969); 16 October: Roman Catholic Church and Eastern Orthodox Churches; 22 October: Armenian Apostolic Church; 14 November: Coptic Orthodox Church
- Attributes: Military attire, lance
- Patronage: military personnel, the blind

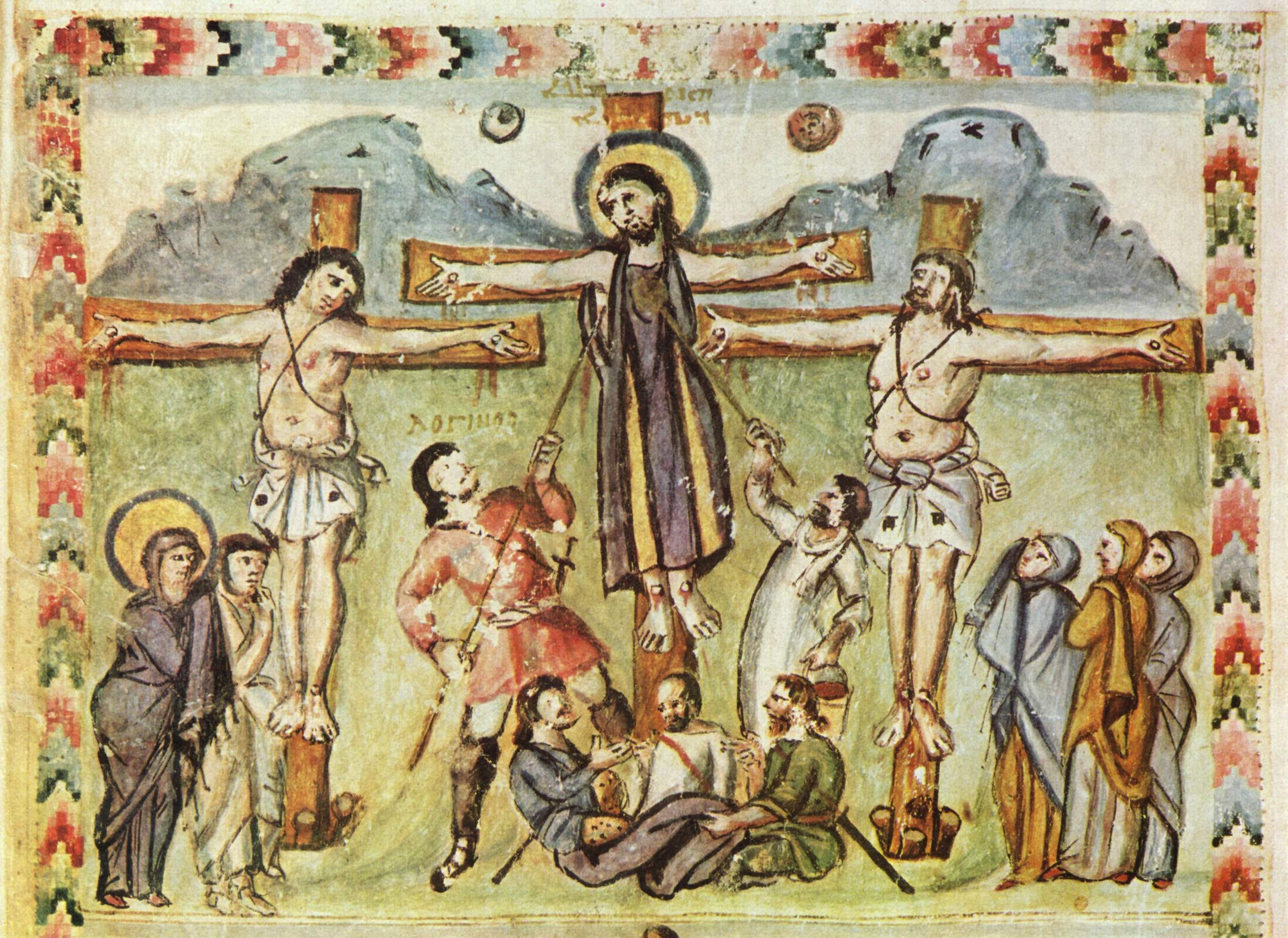
Illustration from the Rabbula Gospels, AD 586: Longinus is labelled "ΛΟΓΙΝΟϹ".

Longinus (Greek: Λογγίνος) is the name given to the unknown Roman soldier who pierced the side of Jesus with a lance, who in medieval and some modern Christian traditions is described as a convert to Christianity. His name first appeared in the apocryphal Gospel of Nicodemus. The lance is called in Catholic Christianity the "Holy Lance" (lancea) and the story is related in the Gospel of John during the Crucifixion. This act is said to have created the last of the Five Holy Wounds of Christ.

This person, unnamed in the Gospels, is further identified in some versions of the story as the centurion present at the Crucifixion, who said that Jesus was the son of God, so he is considered as one of the first Christians and Roman converts. Longinus's legend grew over the years to the point that he was said to have converted to Christianity after the Crucifixion, and he is traditionally venerated as a saint in the Roman Catholic Church, Eastern Orthodox Church, and several other Christian communions.

== Origins ==
No name for this soldier is given in the canonical Gospels; the name Longinus is instead found in the apocryphal Gospel of Nicodemus. Longinus was not originally a saint in Christian tradition. An early tradition, found in a sixth- or seventh-century pseudepigraphal "Letter of Herod to Pilate", claims that Longinus suffered for having pierced Jesus, and that he was condemned to a cave where every night a lion came and mauled him until dawn, after which his body healed back to normal, in a pattern that would repeat until the end of time. Later traditions turned him into a Christian convert, but as Sabine Baring-Gould observed: "The name of Longinus was not known to the Greeks previous to the patriarch Germanus, in 715. It was introduced among the Westerns from the Apocryphal Gospel of Nicodemus. There is no reliable authority for the Acts and martyrdom of this saint."

The name is probably Latinized into a common cognomen of the Cassia gens, from the Greek lónchē (λόγχη), the word used for the spear mentioned in John 19:34. It first appears lettered on an illumination of the Crucifixion beside the figure of the soldier holding a spear, written, perhaps contemporaneously, in horizontal Greek letters, LOGINOS (ΛΟΓΙΝΟϹ), in the Syriac gospel manuscript illuminated by a certain Rabulas in the year 586, in the Laurentian Library, Florence. The spear used is known as the Holy Lance, and more recently, especially in occult circles, as the "Spear of Destiny", which was revered at Jerusalem by the sixth century, although neither the centurion nor the name "Longinus" were invoked in any surviving report. As the "Lance of Longinus", the spear figures in the legends of the Holy Grail.

Blindness or other eye problems are not mentioned until after the tenth century. Petrus Comestor was one of the first to add an eyesight problem to the legend and his text can be translated as "blind", "dim-sighted" or "weak-sighted". The Golden Legend says that he saw celestial signs before conversion and that his eye problems might have been caused by illness or age. The touch of Jesus's blood cures his eye problem:

Christian legend has it that Longinus was a blind Roman centurion who thrust the spear into Christ's side at the crucifixion. Some of Jesus's blood fell upon his eyes and he was healed. Upon this miracle Longinus believed in Jesus.

The body of Longinus is said to have been lost twice, but discovered at Mantua, together with the Holy Sponge stained with Christ's blood, wherewith it was told—extending Longinus's role—that Longinus had assisted in cleansing Christ's body when it was taken down from the cross. The relic enjoyed a revived cult in the late 13th century under the patronage of the Bonacolsi.

The relics are said to have been divided and then distributed to Prague (St. Peter and Paul Basilica, Vyšehrad) and elsewhere. Greek sources assert that he suffered martyrdom in Cappadocia. The Russian Orthodox Cathedral of St. John the Baptist, Washington, DC, purports to have a holy relic, a fragment of bone, of Saint Longinus.

== Present-day veneration ==
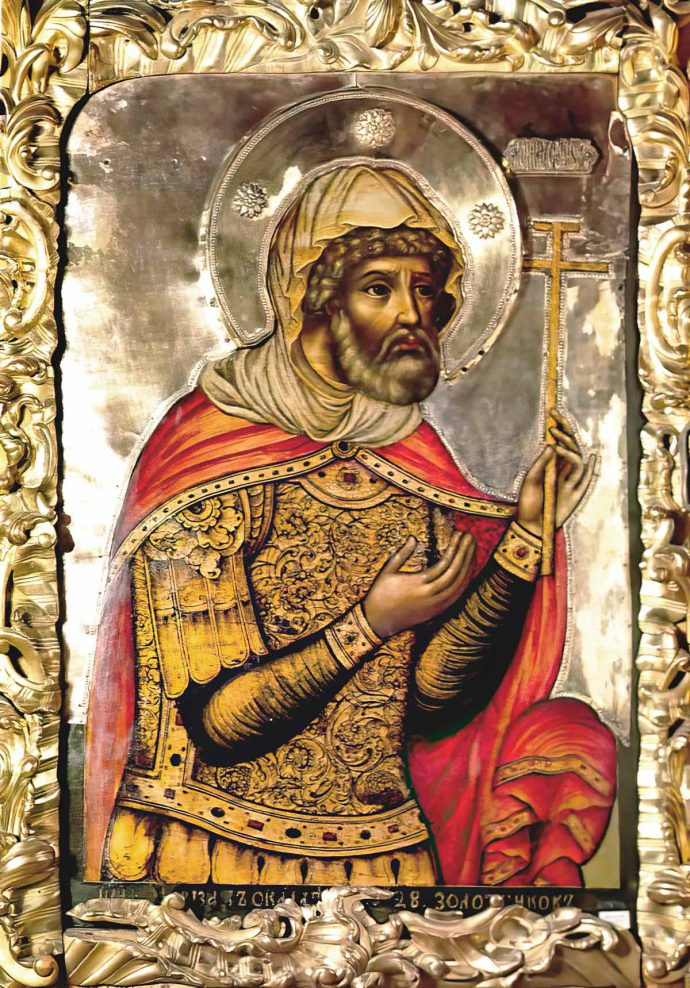
Longinus the Centurion. Russian icon by Fyodor Zubov, 1680

Longinus is venerated, generally as a martyr, in the Roman Catholic Church, the Eastern Orthodox Church, and the Armenian Apostolic Church. His feast day is kept on 16 October in the Roman Martyrology, which mentions him, without any indication of martyrdom, in the following terms: "At Jerusalem, commemoration of Saint Longinus, who is venerated as the soldier opening the side of the crucified Lord with a lance". The pre-1969 feast day in the Roman Rite is 15 March. The Eastern Orthodox Church commemorates him on 16 October. In the Armenian Apostolic Church, his feast is commemorated on 22 October.

The statue of Saint Longinus, sculpted by Gian Lorenzo Bernini, is one of four in the niches beneath the dome of Saint Peter's Basilica, Vatican City. A spearpoint fragment said to be from the Holy Lance is also conserved in the Basilica.

Longinus and his legend are the subject of the Moriones Festival held during Holy Week on the island of Marinduque, the Philippines.

Hagiographical fragments on St. Longinus from 11th–13th century found in Dubrovnik indicate his veneration in this area in Middle Ages. There is altarpiece St. Longinus and St. Gaudentius by an anonymous author from 17th century in St. Anthony the Great Catholic parish church in Veli Lošinj.

The Longinus cross (German: Longinuskreuz) is a special form of the Arma Christi cross, which occurs mainly in the Black Forest, but also occasionally in other regions of South Germany.

=== Brazil ===
==== Folkloric role ====
In Brazil, Saint Longinus – in Portuguese, São Longuinho – is attributed the power of finding missing objects. The saint's aid is summoned by the chant:

São Longuinho, São Longuinho, se eu achar [missing object], dou três pulinhos!
(O Saint Longinus, Saint Longinus, if I find [missing object], I'll hop three times!)

Folk tradition explains the association with missing objects with a tale from the saint's days in Rome. It is said he was of short stature and, as such, had unimpeded view of the underside of tables in crowded parties. Due to this, he would find and return objects dropped on the ground by the other attendants.

Accounts vary regarding the promised offering of three hops, citing either deference to an alleged limping of the saint or a plea to the Holy Trinity.

== Gallery ==
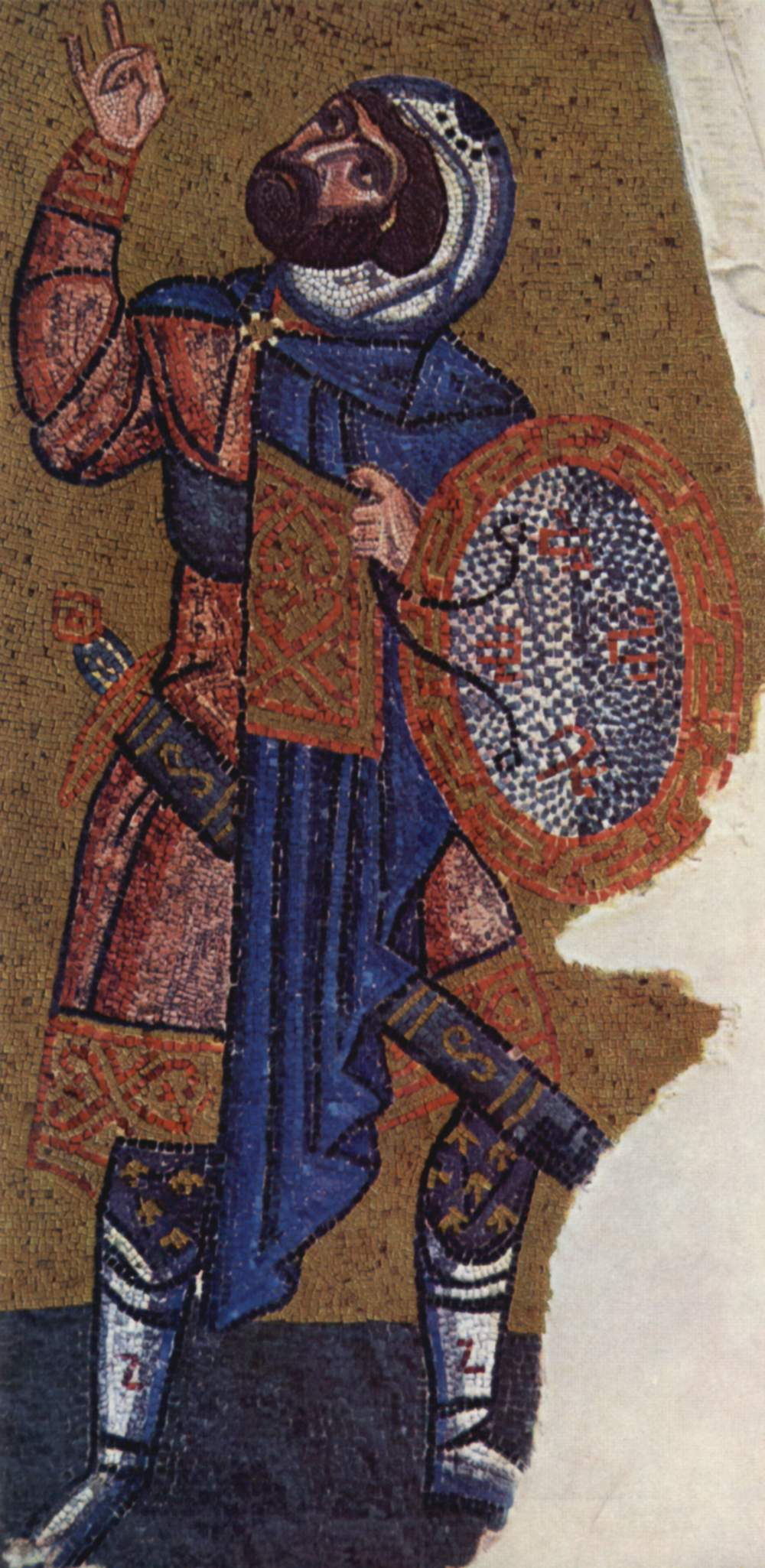
Longinus depicted in the Nea Moni Church, Chios, Greece

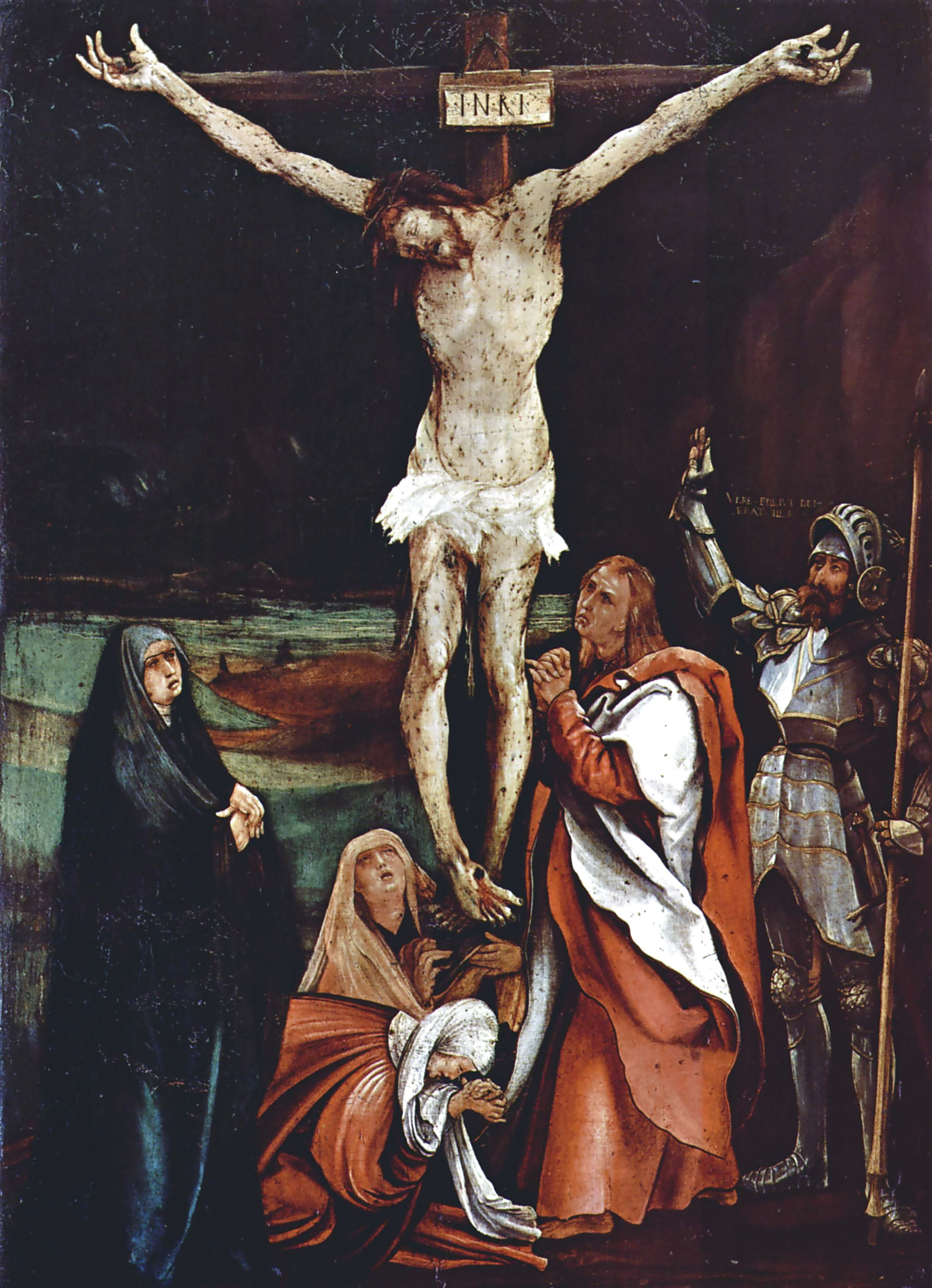
Christ on the Cross, the three Marys, John the Evangelist, and Saint Longinus

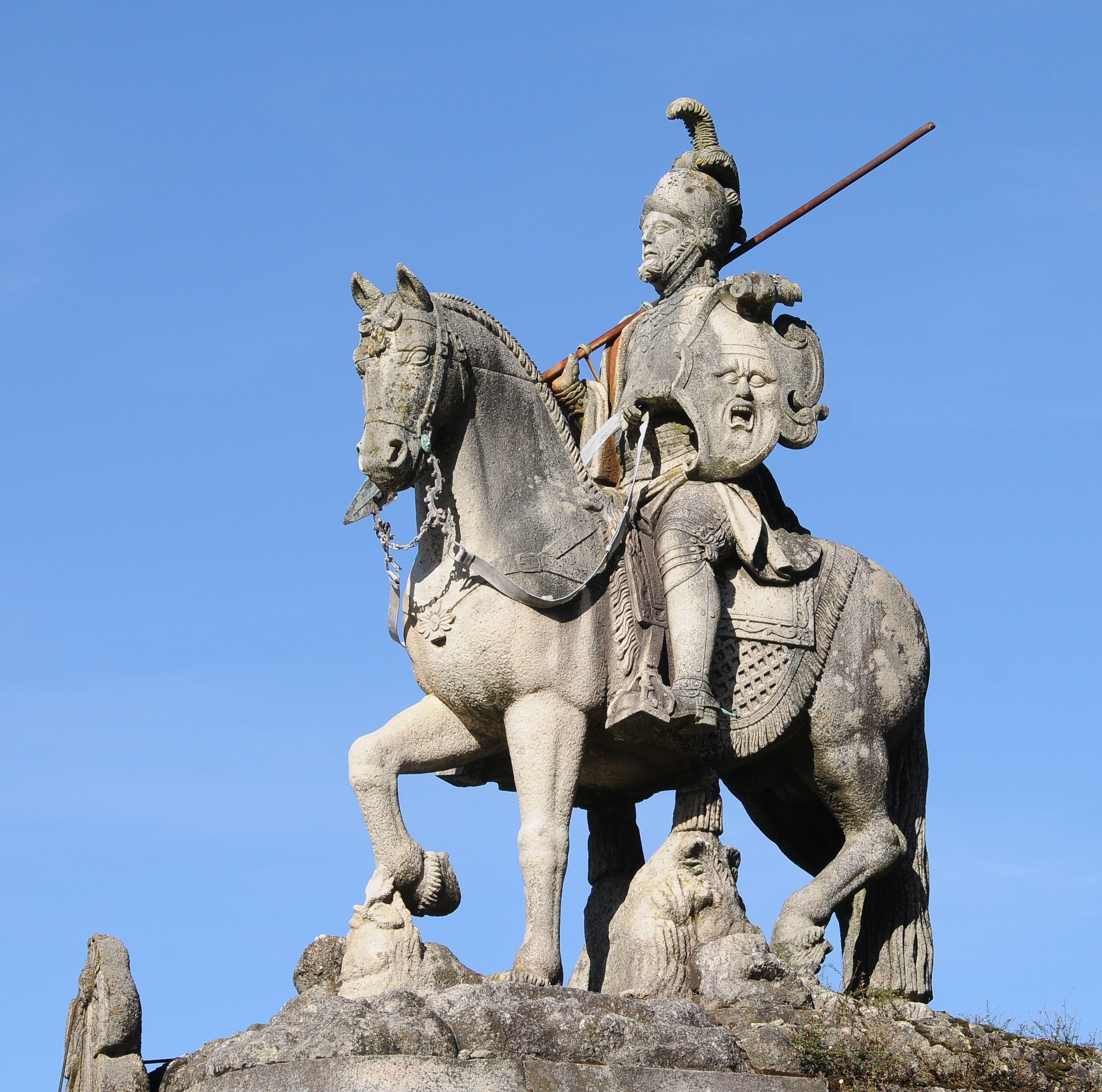
Saint Longinus in Bom Jesus do Monte, Portugal

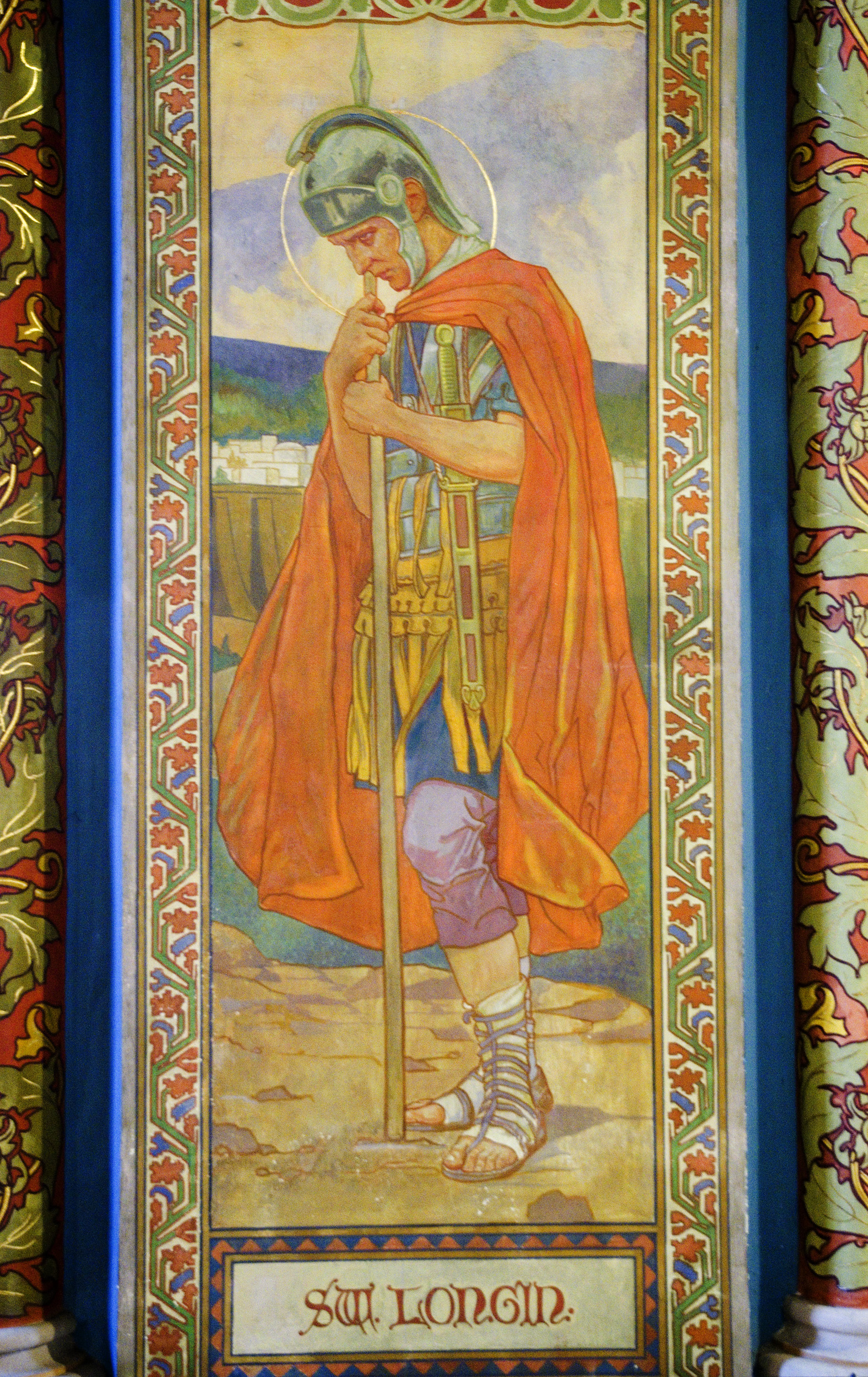
Fresco in Basilica of St Peter and St Paul in Vyšehrad (Prague)

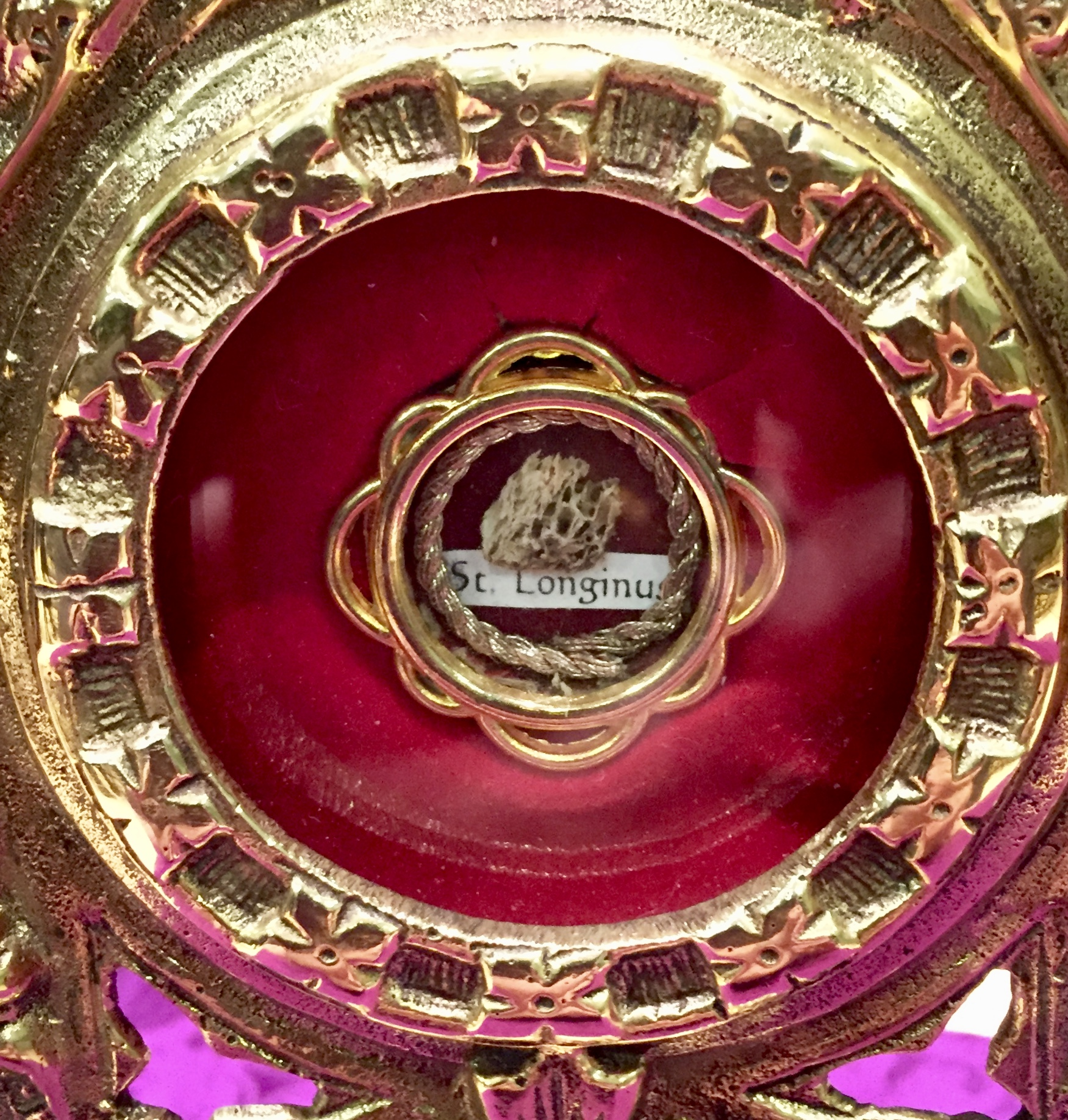
First Class Bone Relic of St. Longinus

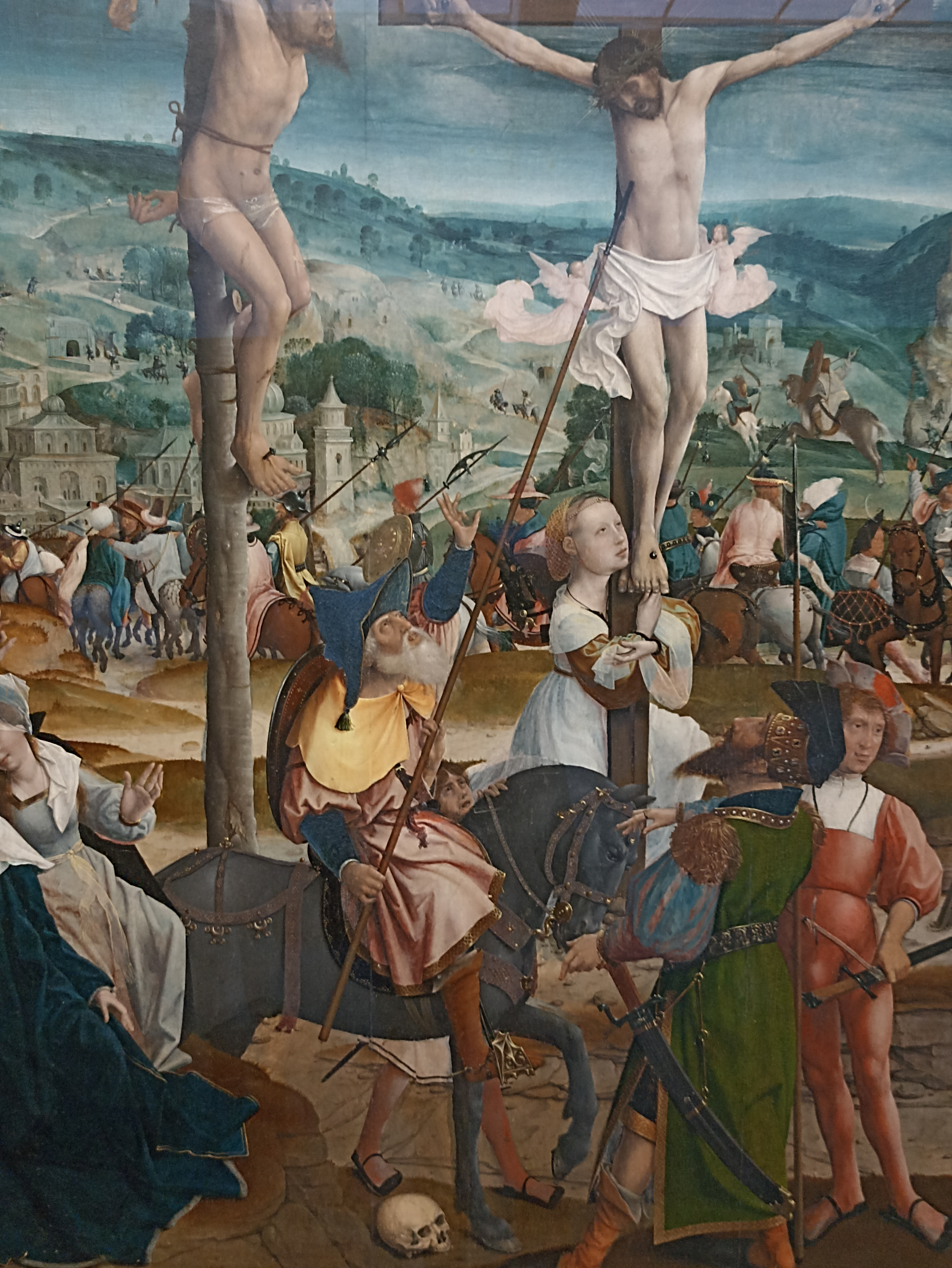
Longinus in The Crucifixion of Jan Provoost (Groeningmuseum of Bruges)

== See also ==
- List of names for the biblical nameless
- Casca
