= Planned Obsolescence (book) =

2011 book by Kathleen Fitzpatrick

- Original 1st edition cover
- Author: Kathleen Fitzpatrick
- Language: English
- Publisher: NYU Press
- Publication date: 2011
- Publication place: United States
- Media type: Print (Paperback)
- Pages: 245
- ISBN: 978-0-814-72787-4

Planned Obsolescence: Publishing, Technology, and the Future of the Academy is a book by Kathleen Fitzpatrick, Director of Scholarly Communication at the Modern Language Association and Visiting Research Professor of English at New York University, published by NYU Press on November 1, 2011. The book provides an overview of issues facing contemporary academic publishing, including the closing of academic presses and the increased pressure on faculty to publish to achieve tenure. Fitzpatrick's central argument is that academia should embrace the possibilities of digital publishing, which will in turn change the culture of academic writing and publishing.

== Major themes ==
The book is divided into five chapters, not including the introduction and conclusion: Peer Review, Authorship, Texts, Preservation, and The University.

=== Toward a new form of peer review ===
Fitzpatrick starts the book by deconstructing one of the most important steps in the academic publication process - peer review. Drawing on a wide-ranging history of and problems in the process of academic peer review, she argues that much of the peer review process is about credentialing rather than about encouraging good ideas. Digital technologies allow for a review process that is more in-line with promoting good ideas: "putting them on the digital table, welcoming diverse attitudes toward them, selecting, shaping and reconfiguring them “curatorially” in imaginative response to freely offered and serious opinions". Keeping this in mind, Fitzpatrick offers a new model for peer review - 'peer-to-peer review'. She uses MediaCommons as an example of a community-filtered web platform that can function as a site to comment on a draft of scholarly work. On such an online platform, authors can post a draft manuscript and invite comments from their peers or the public, or both. Planned Obsolescence itself was posted on MediaCommons Press as a draft and comments were invited from the general public.

=== Changing conceptions of authorship ===
With digital publishing, Fitzpatrick envisions a shift in the accepted conception of authorship from a solitary enterprise with a definite endpoint in the creation of the text to one of writing within a community as part of an ongoing process. This change is a result of the capabilities of word processing, which allows for the swift and simple revision of text, and the digital networking, which enables linking, reader commentary, and version control. By releasing text to be read and commented upon online authorship becomes ongoing, process-oriented work taking place in a community of interested readers.

Another aspect of community or collective authorship that Fitzpatrick explores is related to remix culture. She proposes a possible model of scholarly writing that collects and compiles work in illuminating ways. To be viable, this would require institutional acknowledgement that this kind of work is as valuable as the traditional scholarly monograph, and also the participation of the scholarly community in a gift economy with their work. She suggests that scholars use a Creative Commons license for scholarly work to facilitate the use and reuse of material for the collective benefit of the community.

Fitzpatrick acknowledges that online writing, and particularly the use of platforms that enable reader comments, will require authors to develop a different relationship to their work. They must be committed to supporting online discussions without dominating them, and they must accept that this will increase the amount of time that they must invest in their writing, both because online discussions require regular participation and because their duration is indeterminate.

=== New textual forms ===
For Fitzpatrick, blogs, hypertext, and databases suggest directions in which digital scholarly publishing might move. She sees early attempts at hypertext writing as ultimately about the thought process of the author rather than the reader, but locates a possible future in the use of databases as platforms to create works by pulling together writing and media elements to create “new forms of networked arguments driven by the juxtaposition of digital objects and their analysis.” Such texts might be multimodal, Fitzpatrick's term for texts that do not simply include media objects but instead incorporate media into their analysis or use media as analysis.

=== The social roots of technical problems ===
Fitzpatrick continues to develop her ideas of the importance of community with an analysis of digital text preservation in which she proposes that current technical issues with digital text preservation will require social solutions. This proposal is based on Fitzpatrick's reasoning that difficulties in the preservation of digital texts are not caused by any quality inherent to digital artifacts but, rather, stem from our understanding of digital products and our social practices concerning their use. It is often assumed that issues with digital preservation are due to the ephemeral quality of digital artifacts. Fitzpatrick points out that this is not entirely correct, illustrating that print text is by no means permanent and digital text is far more permanent than is commonly thought. The loss of access to digital texts or their interpretability, sometimes due to incompatibility between older media formats and newer platforms, is mistakenly perceived as the loss of digital texts themselves. Establishing this fact, Fitzpatrick argues that digital preservation efforts should not focus entirely on technical solutions to technical issues, but instead should concentrate on developing socially organized preservation systems. In addition to focusing on the development of preservation practices through community organization, Fitzpatrick argues that creators of digital artifacts must take steps to ensure the compatibility of their work with preservation efforts, stating: “…planning for the persistent availability of digital resources as part of the process of their creation will provide the greatest stability of the resources themselves at the least possible cost”.

In addition to community cooperation and coordination, Fitzpatrick shows that the incorporation of open standards and built-in extensibility are crucial to the development of successful digital text preservation practices. Included in these practices are three key components: the development of standards for text markup, so that digital texts can be read across a variety of platforms; the inclusion of rich metadata, so that digital texts can be located reliably; and the preservation of access to digital texts themselves. To support her argument for social solutions, Fitzpatrick examines several successful projects concerned with the development of text markup, metadata, and access standards and practices (including TEI, DOI, and LOCKSS) and shows that each is based in the creation of a community organization that values openness and extensibility.

=== Rethinking and repurposing for sustainable scholarly publishing ===
At the heart of scholarly text production, preservation, and dissemination lies the university. In a time of unfavorable economic conditions, Fitzpatrick suggests that the university may continue to fulfill its role in these endeavors only by rethinking its mission and repurposing its operational units. While the university press may have originally functioned to disseminate the work of an institution's faculty to the larger community, in recent years, the university press has become a market-driven entity that is separate from the academic core of the university. Though university presses typically do not turn a profit and must depend on university subsidies to operate, they are often expected to be financially self-sustaining and, driven by this expectation, function to fulfill a mission much different from that of the university. Fitzpatrick attributes the recent trend of shuttering university presses to shrinking university budgets and the unsustainable business models in which many presses are forced to operate.

For Fitzpatrick, the key to establishing financially viable models for university presses and modes of scholarly publishing more generally is the reconceptualization of the university's mission. Universities must recognize that their mission is, in addition to the production of knowledge, the communication of knowledge. Fitzpatrick conceptualizes scholarship as an ongoing conversation between scholars that can only continue if participants have the means to contribute to it. Publishing and disseminating information via the university press is one possible mode of communication. This reconceptualization of the university's mission is part and parcel to the restructuring of its press's functioning. If the university is reimagined as a center of communication, rather than principally as a credential-bestowing organization, its central mission becomes the production and dissemination of scholarly work. In this rethinking, the press has a future as the knowledge-disseminating organ of the university. For this to happen, the press must be integrated within the university and be provided sufficient funding so that its mission is not financially based but, rather, aligns with that of the university.

Following this restructuring, Fitzpatrick suggests that the mission of the university may be further strengthened by creating new partnerships and modes of operation between the university library, the IT department, and the university press. As argued throughout the book, scholarly publishing in its current as well as future forms stands to benefit from various forms of cooperation and each of these units may contribute something unique to enhance the production of scholarly work. These new interactions may lead to roles for the library, the press, and IT as service units that provide guidance during and add value to the scholarly production process.

Lastly, Fitzpatrick suggests that these shifting locations and roles of the university press may remove the financial concerns previously restricting their abilities to experiment with new modes of publishing, perhaps allowing presses to explore alternative, more sustainable and open publishing models, including open access publishing.

== Peer-review process ==
Two years before publication Planned Obsolescence was openly peer-reviewed online at MediaCommons Press. The manuscript is still available for open discussion on the website. Putting up a draft manuscript of the book up for open public review and debate allowed Fitzpatrick to demonstrate one of the key points of the book - that scholars have a lot to gain from openly sharing their work on digital platforms, and that open debates should become a part of the publishing process itself.

== Reception ==
Planned Obsolescence has been reviewed or discussed in a number of publications by a range of writers.

Critics have written positively on Fitzpatrick's treatment of authorship. Houman Barekat in the Los Angeles Review of Books described Fitzpatrick's reluctance to understand authorship as an effect of technologies and processes of production as "a sobering antidote to the vulgar technological determinism that characterizes so much of the hype around the digital revolution." Alex Halavais notes that Fitzpatrick "masterfully" threads history, questions, and practical implications of technologies for writers, while neither ignoring nor relying too heavily on the theoretical concept of "the death of the author".

Fitzpatrick's exploration of academic peer review has received less favorable criticism. In particular, her critique of the traditional mores of academic publication, whereby texts are first reviewed by colleagues and only published if they meet certain criteria, lacks clear "requirements for a proposed alternative system". Fitzpatrick's outline of post-publication peer review, the suggested alternative to pre-publication peer review, has been met with mixed appraisal: One reviewer deemed her proposal "riddled with flaws", while another reviewer commended the public scholarship potential of such an open method.

Planned Obsolescence has also been listed as required reading for courses on the digital humanities, new media, and/or interactive technology and pedagogy in institutions such as the University of Maryland, Emory University, the CUNY Graduate Center, and the University of Wisconsin-Madison.

== See also ==
- Academic publishing
- Peer review
- Digital collaboration
