= Holyrood (cross) =

Christian relic

The Holyrood or Holy Rood is a Christian relic alleged to be part of the True Cross on which Jesus died. The word is the modern form of the Old English rood, meaning a pole and the cross, via Middle English, the equivalent in the Scots language being haly ruid ("holy cross"). Several relics venerated as part of the True Cross are known by this name, in England, Ireland and Scotland.

== Black Rood of Scotland ==
Saint Margaret (c. 1045–1093), a Saxon Princess of England, was born in Hungary. Following the conquest of England by the Normans in 1066, she fled to Scotland, where she married Malcolm III Canmore, King of Scotland. She is said to have brought the "Holy Rood", a fragment of Christ's cross, from Hungary or England to Scotland with her. It was known as the Black Rood of Scotland.

The Catholic Encyclopedia reports that Saint Margaret brought the cross from Waltham Abbey, after which it was kept in Holyrood Abbey, which her son erected in Edinburgh.

The relic was removed from Scotland by Edward I of England in 1296, along with the Stone of Scone and other treasures, but the Black Rood was returned in 1328. It was regained by the English following the Battle of Neville's Cross in 1346, after which it was held in Durham Cathedral until the Reformation of 1540, when it was presumably destroyed.

Aelred of Rievaulx gave a description of the relic in his Genealogia regum Anglorum ("Genealogy of the Kings of the English" written 1153–54) which has been translated as "It is about an ell long, manufactured of pure gold, of most wonderful workmanship, and is shut and opened like a chest. Inside may be seen a portion of our Lord's Cross, (as has often been proved by convincing miracles), having a figure of our Saviour sculptured of massive ivory, and marvellously adorned with gold." An inventory made in England described the cross and its case in Latin soon after it was taken from Edinburgh Castle in 1296 as; "Unum scrinium argenteum deauratum in quo reponitur crux que vocatur le blake rode", which can be translated as "A silver-gilt casket in which lies the cross called the Black Rood".

== Holy Cross Abbey ==
A fragment of the Holy Rood was brought to a Cistercian Abbey in Thurles, County Tipperary, Ireland by Isabella of Angoulême, widow of King John of England, and thenceforth the Abbey was called Holy Cross Abbey. The relic was lost following the Cromwellian war in Ireland. However, it was later found and is currently in the Abbey.

== Waltham Abbey ==
The term is also applied to the black flint cross formerly held at Waltham Abbey in Essex, England. The Holy Rood or Cross was the subject of veneration and pilgrimage in the Middle Ages, but disappeared when the Abbey was dissolved in 1540. Local Somerset tradition has it that the flint cross (or crosses) were found on St Michael's Hill, Montacute. Then variously called Logaresburgh by the Saxons, later Bishopstone or Biscepstone, the Montacute estate was owned by Tofig (Tovy), a staller (placeman or court office-holder) to Danish King Canute. Village tradition remembers Tofig as "Cnut's standard bearer". In 1030 (1035 in some records) following a series of dreams in which the Devil told him where to dig, a local blacksmith found buried on St Michael's Hill a black flint crucifix or Holy Rood. (Some early versions state two black flint crosses were found, one large, one small. Another variant is that the second cross was wooden, and accompanied by a bell and a book/copy of the gospels.) Tofig loaded the life-sized cross (or crosses) onto a cart, and then named a series of possible destinations owned by him. The oxen pulling the wagon (six red and six white in one version of the tale) refused to move until he said Waltham in Essex, where Tofig already had a hunting lodge. They then started, and continued non-stop until they reached Waltham, and where they stopped Tofig decided to build an abbey at the site – this became Waltham Abbey. In the meantime, Tofig rebuilt the church at Waltham to house the cross, on which he bestowed his own sword, and his second wife Gytha (or Glitha), the daughter of Osgod Clapa, adorned the figure with a crown, bands of gold and precious stones.

The cross became the object of pilgrimage, notably by Harold Godwinson. "Holy Cross" became the battle-cry of Harold's armies at the battles of Stamford Bridge and Hastings. The Holy Rood is said to have foretold Harold's defeat at Hastings: on the way there from the Battle of Stamford Bridge he stopped off at Waltham Abbey to pray, and the legend is that the cross "bowed down" off the wall as he did so, taken as a portent of doom. There have been suggestions that the smaller cross became the "Holy Rood" which was carried to Scotland from Waltham Abbey by St Margaret. There has been further speculation that the site the relics were excavated from was the burial site of Joseph of Arimathea as some versions of the Grail Story conflate the hills of Montacute and Glastonbury, both being dedicated to St Michael. Given that a black flint cross was said to have been carried to Scotland from Waltham, it seems possible that this was one of, or part of one of, the Montacute crosses.

== See also ==
- Alchemy and chemistry in medieval Islam
- Cornucopia (mythical vessels with magical powers)
- Cross of Neith
- Cup of Jamshid
- Chalice of Doña Urraca
- Church of the Holy Rude
- Dream of the Rood
- Drinking horn
- Holy Chalice
- Holy Grail
- Holy Prepuce
- Holy Sponge
- Mythological objects (list)
- Nail (relic)
- Nanteos Cup
- Relic
- Relics attributed to Jesus
- Rood
- Sampo
- Sandals of Jesus Christ
- Shroud of Turin
- Titulus Crucis
- Tree of Jesse
- True Cross
