= Sandals of Jesus Christ =

Among the most important relics of the Catholic Church in the Middle Ages

Coordinates: 50°12′23″N 6°25′33″E

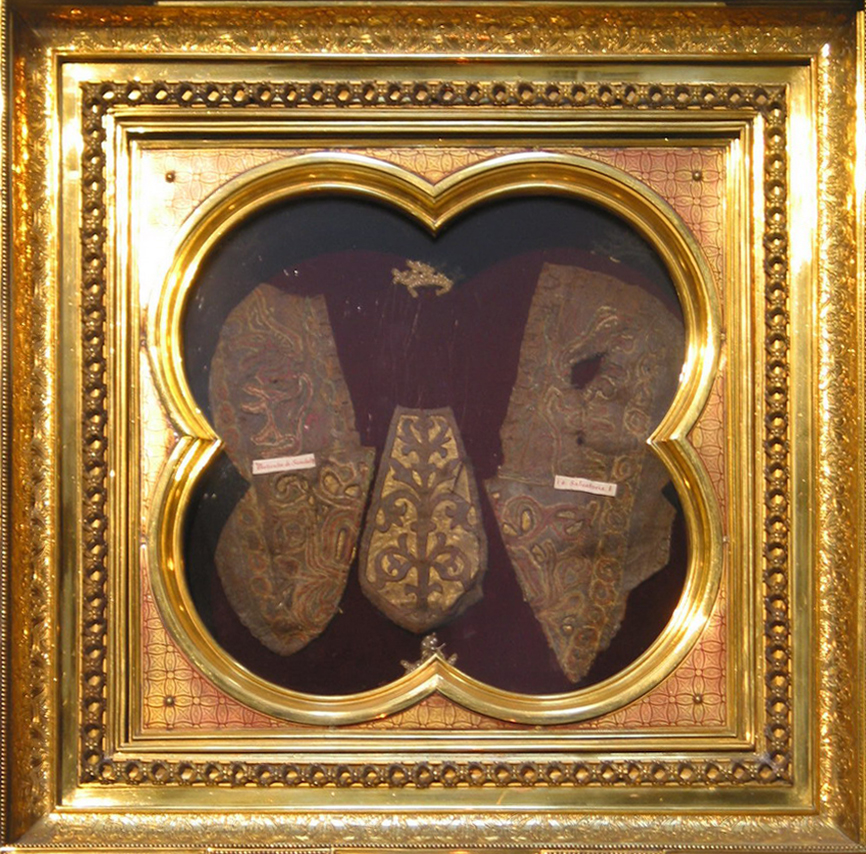
The Sandals of Jesus displayed in Prüm Abbey in Germany

The Sandals of Jesus Christ were among the most important relics of the Catholic Church in the Middle Ages. They were donated to Prüm Abbey by Pepin the Short who received them from Pope Stephen II (752–757).

== Description ==
The sandals are the remains of an ornate fabric shoe (slipper) allegedly given to the Abbey by Pepin the Short in the Carolingian period (7th to 9th centuries).

They are mentioned by Pepin in the deed of 762, and he is said to have received them from Rome as a gift of Pope Stephen II. Stephen and Pepin first met at Ponthion in 754 on January 6, Epiphany, a feast day that commemorates the Magi presenting gifts to the Christ child. The chronicle of Count Nibelung says that the pope bestowed many gifts on the king and his retinue. Apart from its religious significance, the relic was the physical embodiment of the Frankish king's legitimization by the church.

Pepin managed the expansion of the small Prüm Abbey over 30 years, leaving it as a huge property named Saint Salvador (Holy Saviour), the favourite monastery of the Carolingian dynasty, which was legitimized by the relic. The sandals never became the focus of a formal liturgical cult.

== Competition for pilgrims ==
The possession of important relics was a means of sustaining church influence and status. In order to compete with a powerful abbey, it was important to acquire relics of similar provenance and significance. In the 12th Century, the Roman Catholic Diocese of Trier became increasingly powerful and obtained a robe thought to belong to Jesus. Called the Seamless robe of Jesus, it was seen as more significant than the sandals. Over the following four centuries, Trier won the power struggle against Prüm and, by 1524, had become the major pilgrimage destination. In 1574, Prüm became subordinated to Trier.

== See also ==
- Holy Chalice
- Holy Grail
- Holy Prepuce
- Holy Sponge
- Holyrood (cross)
- Nail (relic)
- Shroud of Turin
- Titulus Crucis
- True Cross

== Literature ==
- Ludwig Petry (Hrsg.): Handbuch der historischen Stätten|Handbuch der historischen Stätten Deutschlands, Bd. 5: Rheinland-Pfalz und Saarland. Kinder Stuttgart 1958, Seite 295 (Scan from the source).
