= Arma Christi =

Objects associated with the Passion of Jesus

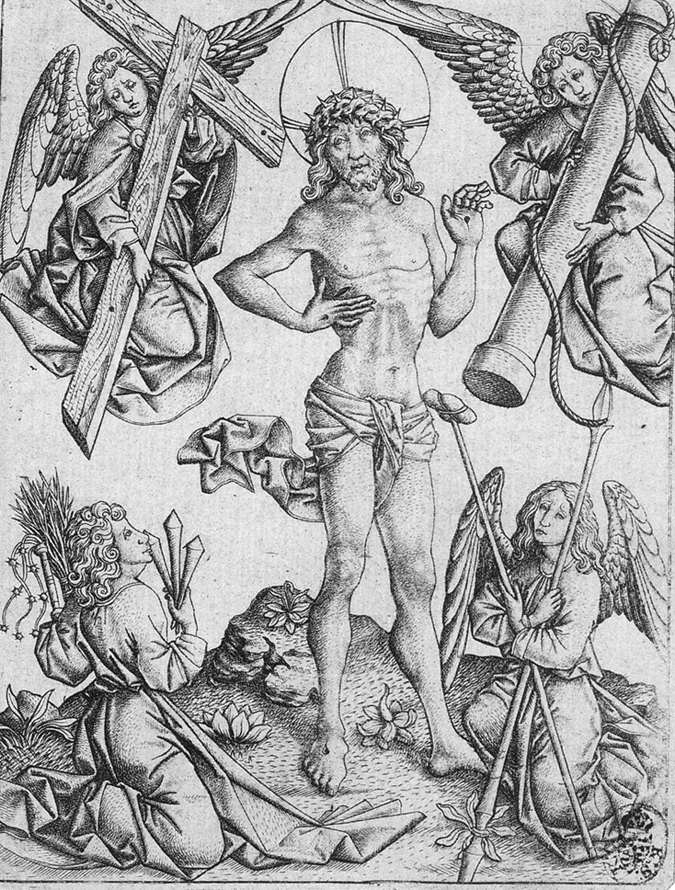
Christ as Man of Sorrows between Four Angels, engraving by Master E. S., c. 1460

Arma Christi ("weapons of Christ"), or the Instruments of the Passion, are the objects associated with the Passion of Jesus Christ in Christian symbolism and art. They are seen as arms in the sense of heraldry, and also as the weapons Christ used to achieve his conquest over Satan. There is a group, at a maximum of about 20 items, which are frequently used in Christian art, especially in the Late Middle Ages. Typically, they surround either a cross or a figure of Christ of the Man of Sorrows type, either placed around the composition, or held by angels.

== History ==
The prime member, the Cross, had been introduced to Christian art in the 4th century as the crux invicta, a symbol of victory. As a group, they have a long tradition in iconography, dating back to the 9th century; the Utrecht Psalter of 830 is an example, though the only one from the Early Middle Ages known to Gertrud Schiller. This reflected an increase in theological interest in the sufferings of Christ at the time. The Middle English poem Arma Christi, which appeared before the end of the 14th century, exists in fifteen manuscripts, attesting to its popularity, of which seven are engrossed in highly unusual scroll form, designed to be displayed in church as a pictorial aid to public devotion; manuscripts of Arma Christi are generally accompanied by illustrations of the instruments, viewing of which, according to the texts, granted indulgence of a certain number of days in Purgatory to come.

Relics of the most important items had a long history, dating back to the Empress Helena's discovery of the True Cross in the early 4th century. Relics claiming to be the Holy Lance, Holy Sponge, Holy Chalice and nails from the cross were all venerated well before 1000, and were to proliferate in later centuries. There was a wave of new relics in the West at the time of the Crusades, and a further wave as the Instruments became featured more prominently in devotional literature and practices in the 14th century.

In art, the Instruments either surrounded an image of Christ in andachtsbilder subjects such as the Man of Sorrows, or might appear by themselves - often the image of Christ's face on the Veil of Veronica was the focal point of the image. In both cases, the purpose of the representations was to symbolize the sufferings of Christ during his Passion. They had the practical advantage for less accomplished artists of being much easier to represent than human figures, and were no doubt often treated as a subject an apprentice could be left to do. Possibly the earliest representation of the isolated instruments laid out across a space is in a drawing in a German manuscript of about 1175, where they are to one side of a Christ in Majesty. In devotional books they were sometimes, by the Late Middle Ages, shown one at a time, accompanying one of the many texts that devoted meditations in turn to the episodes in which each had been used, before culminating in a figure subject with Jesus. Miniature versions of the objects were attached to rosaries and crucifixes, and used as aids to contemplation of the suffering of Christ.

== The Instruments ==
Depictions of the Instruments of the Passion may include many combinations of those following (though the cross of Jesus is almost always represented). A primary group of the most frequently used instruments can be distinguished:

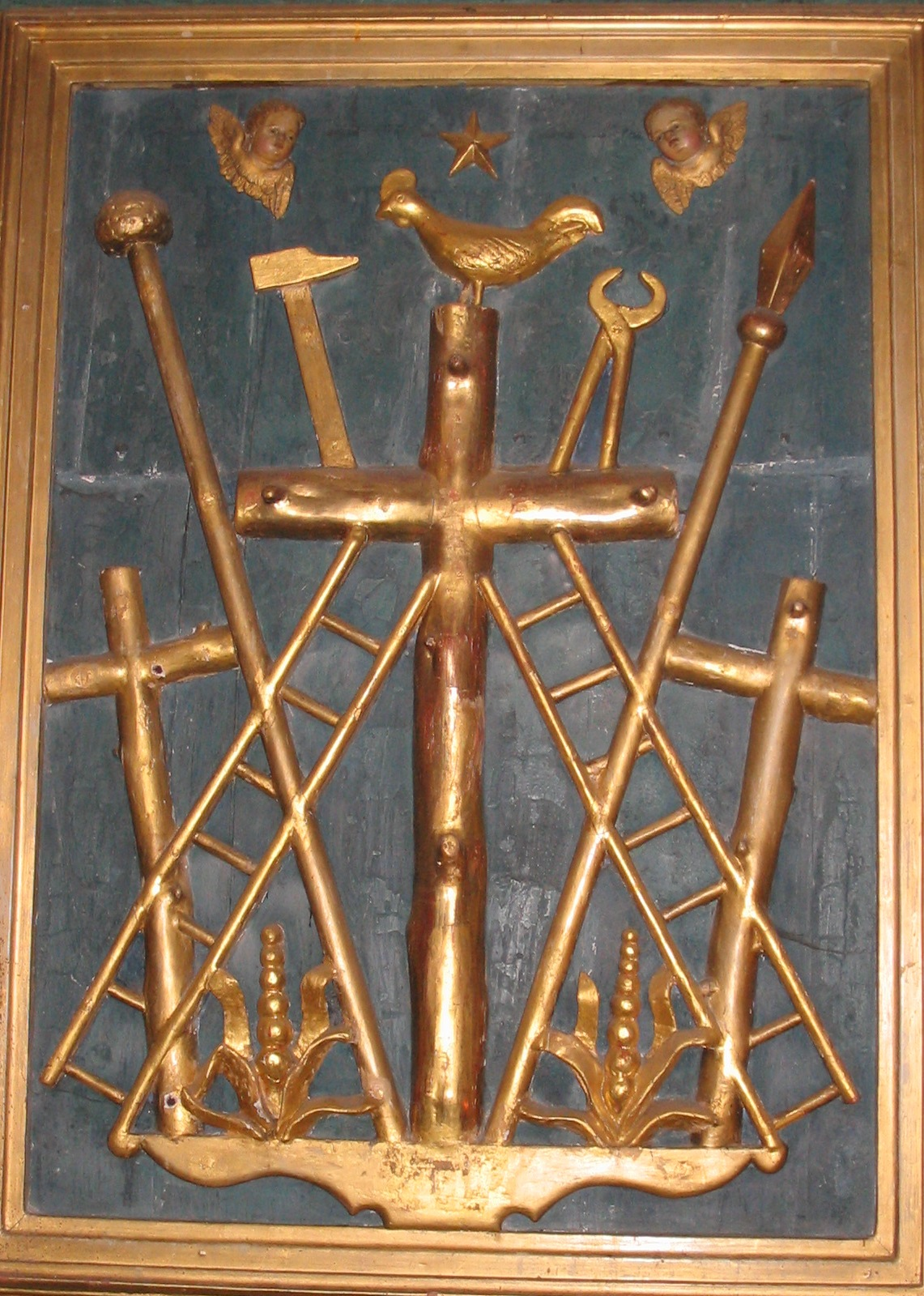
The instruments of the Passion. Left to right: the cross of the penitent thief Dismas, ladder, sponge on reed, hammer, angels, Cross of Christ, cock, star, pincers, ladder, spear, cross of the wicked thief Gestas, and two hyssop plants growing from the ground (Église Saint-Pierre de Collonges-la-Rouge)

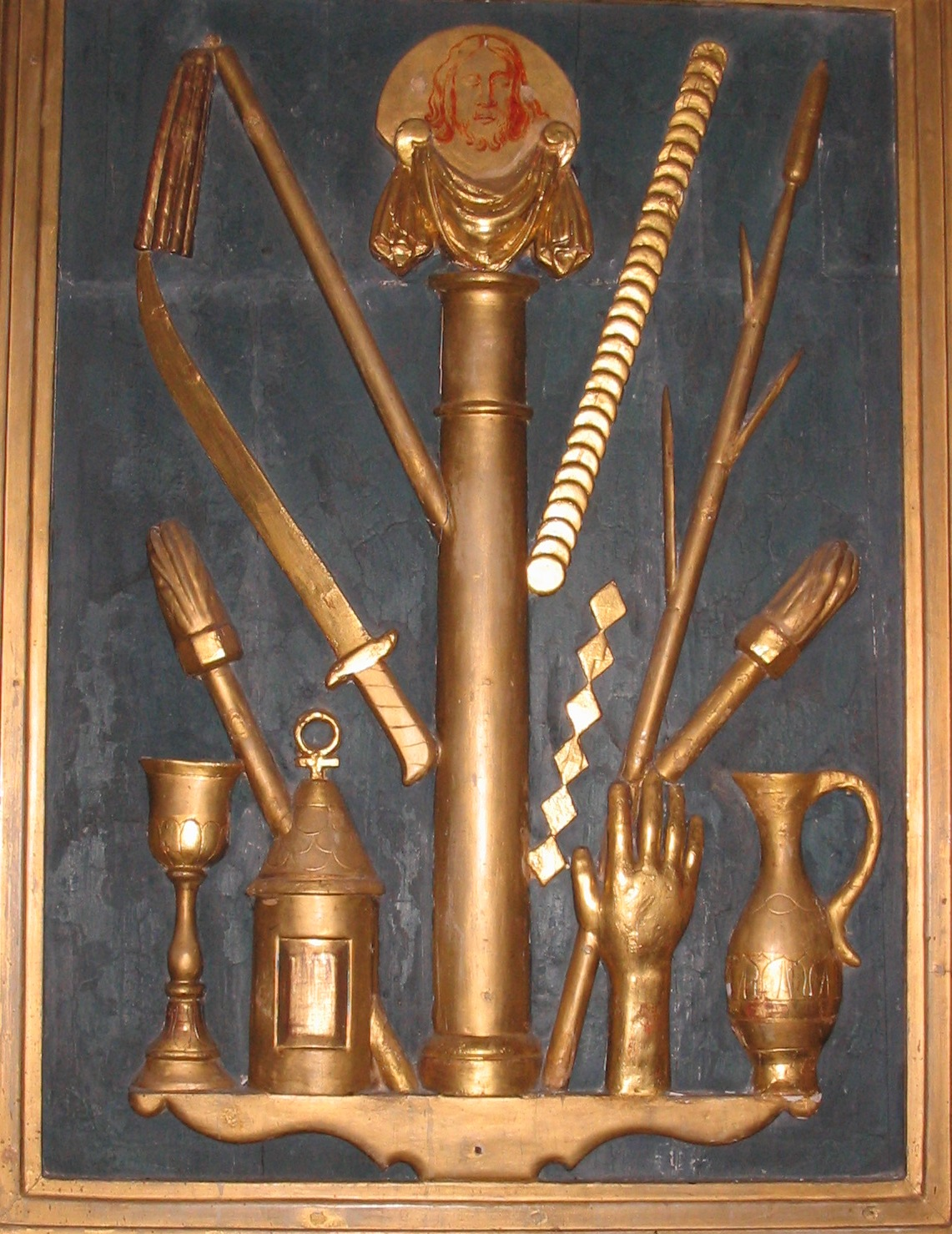
The instruments of the Passion (cont). Left to right: chalice, torch, lantern, sword, flagellum, pillar of flagellation, Veronica's veil, 30 pieces of silver, dice, reed sceptre, hand which struck Christ, torch, pitcher of gall and vinegar

- The Cross on which Jesus was crucified (True Cross), either depicted alone or with the crosses of the two thieves
- The Crown of Thorns
- The pillar or column where Jesus was whipped in the Flagellation of Christ
- The whip(s), in Germany often birches, used for the 39 lashes
- The Holy Sponge set on a reed, with which gall and vinegar were offered to Jesus
- The Holy Lance with which a Roman soldier inflicted the final of the Five Wounds in his side
- The Nails, inflicting four wounds on the hands and feet
- The Veil of Veronica

Other common ones are:

- The reed which was placed in Jesus' hand as a sceptre in mockery
- The purple robe of mockery
- The Titulus Crucis, attached to the Cross. It may be inscribed in Latin (INRI, Iesus Nazarenus Rex Iudaeorum), Greek, Hebrew, or some other language.
- The Holy Chalice (or Holy Grail), the chalice used by Jesus at The Last Supper, and which some traditions say Joseph of Arimathea used to catch his blood at the crucifixion
- The Seamless robe of Jesus
- The dice with which the soldiers cast lots for Christ's seamless robe
- The rooster (cock) that crowed after Peter's third denial of Jesus
- The vessel used to hold the gall and vinegar
- The ladder used for the Deposition, i.e. the removal of Christ's body from the cross for burial
- The ropes used for the Raising of the Cross
- The hammer used to drive the nails into Jesus' hands and feet
- The pincers used to remove the nails
- The vessel of myrrh, used to anoint the body of Jesus, either by Joseph of Arimathea or by the Myrrhbearers
- The shroud used to wrap the body of Jesus before burial
- The sun and moon, representing the eclipse which occurred during the Passion
- Thirty pieces of silver (or a money bag), the price of Judas' betrayal
- A spitting face, indicating the mockery of Jesus
- The hand which slapped Jesus' face
- The chains or cords which bound Jesus overnight in prison
- The lantern or torches used by the arresting soldiers at the time of the betrayal, as well as their swords and staves
- The sword used by Peter to cut off the ear of the High Priest's servant. Sometimes a human ear is also represented.
- Sometimes the heads or hands of figures from the Passion are shown, including Judas, Caiaphas, or the man who mocked Christ spitting in Christ's face. The washing hands of Pontius Pilate may be shown. The Lorenzo Monaco painting below has several such images.
- The trumpet played to mock Christ on the Way to Calvary.

== Other contexts ==
The principal group of the Instruments appear in other contexts as well. The lance and sponge on a stick are held as though they are standards or weapons by the archangels flanking the throne of Christ in a 6th-century mosaic from Ravenna (now in the Bode Museum, Berlin), and are often shown in this way thereafter, especially in scenes of the Last Judgement. In Eastern Orthodox art they are often on or around the Hetoimasia or "empty throne" of judgement. The Crown of Thorns sometimes hangs alone on the cross; it has been suggested that the Celtic cross originated from this motif. The minor Instruments generally did not develop a sufficient ability to be recognised and understood in this way, and appear only in groups.

== Gallery ==
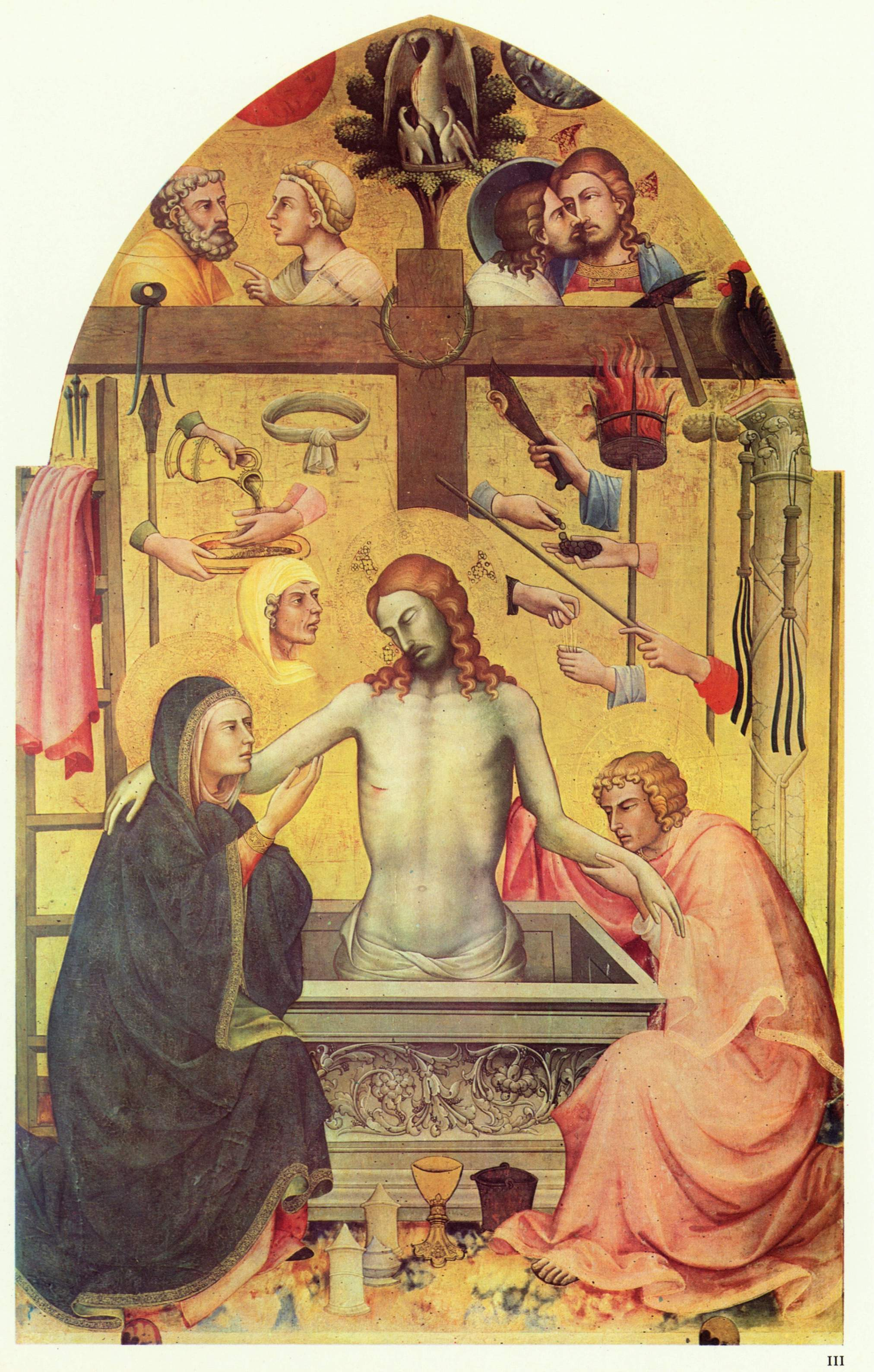
Pietà with Arma Christi, Lorenzo Monaco, 1404

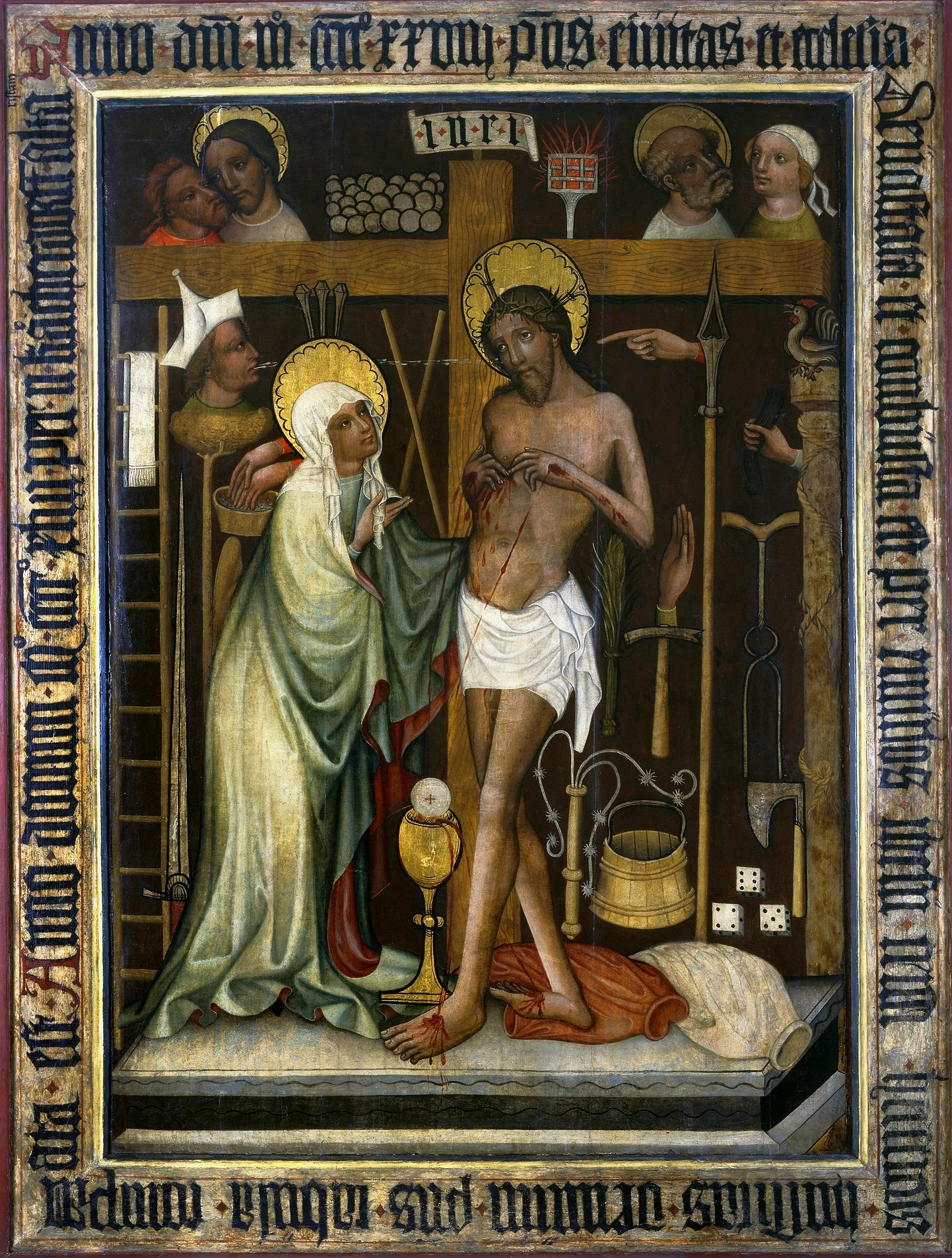
Votive panel, Wrocław, 1443

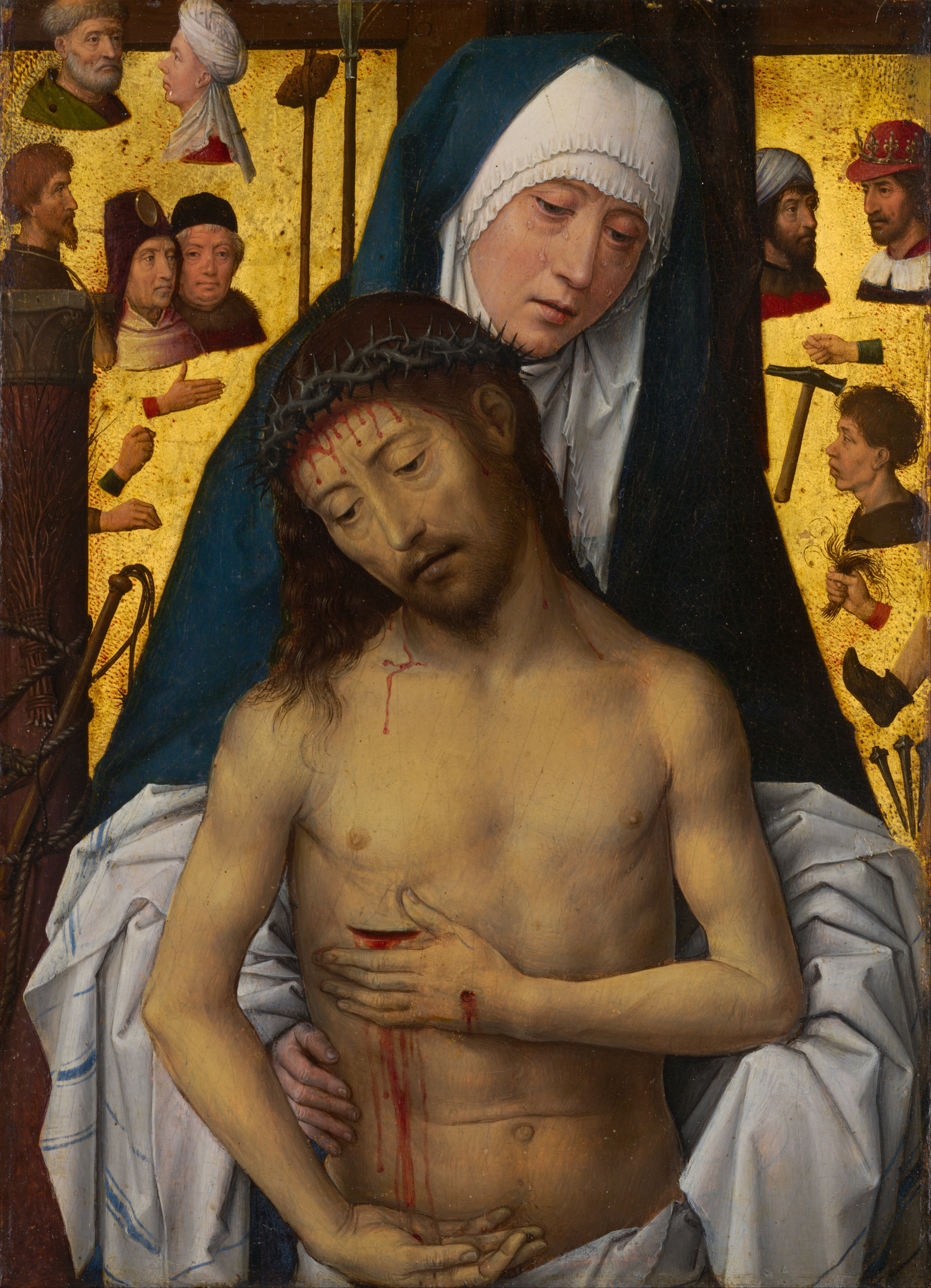
Hans Memling, The Man of Sorrows in the arms of the Virgin, 1470s

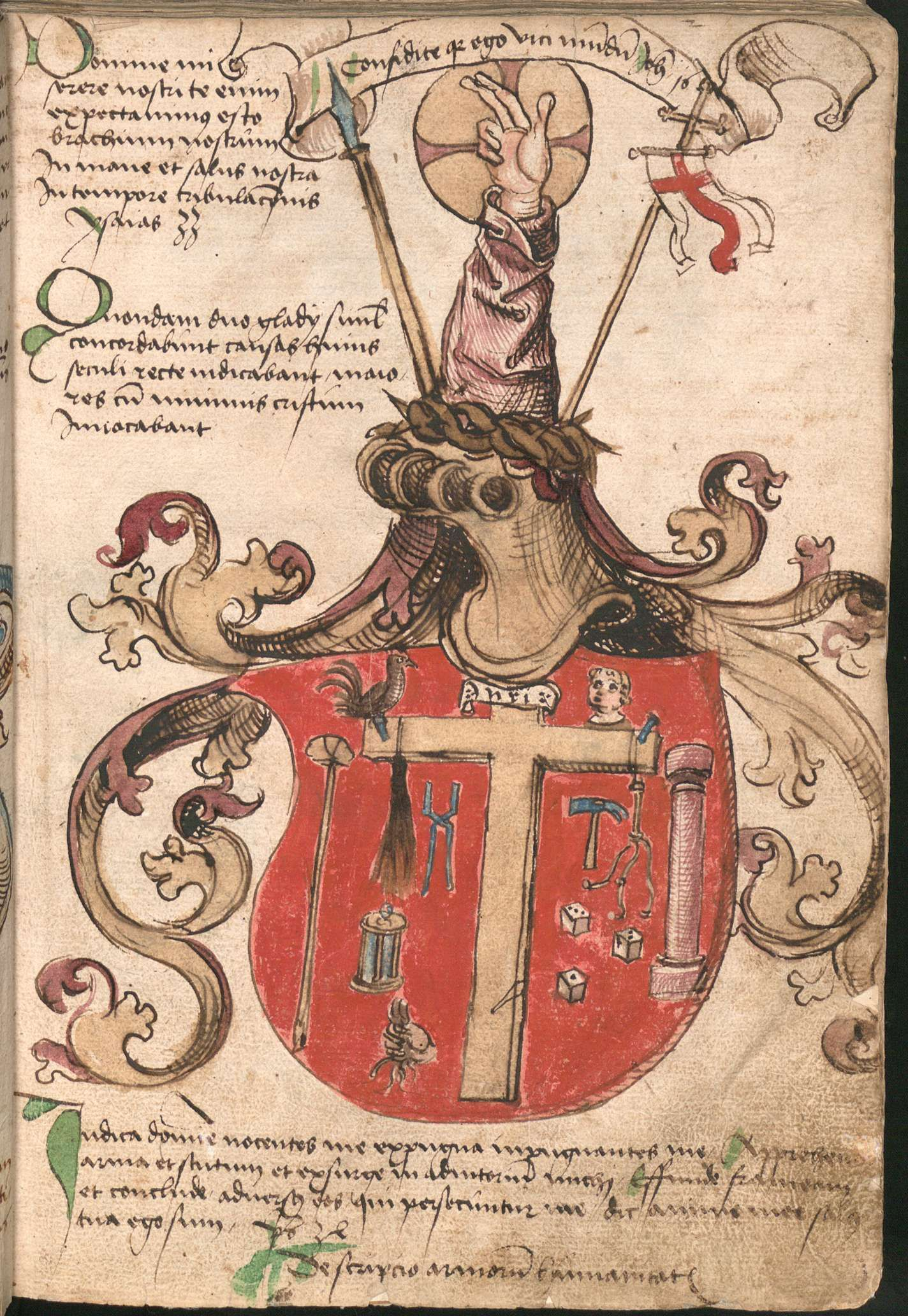
Fictive coat of arms of Jesus Christ in the Wernigerode Armorial (Southern Germany, c. 1490)

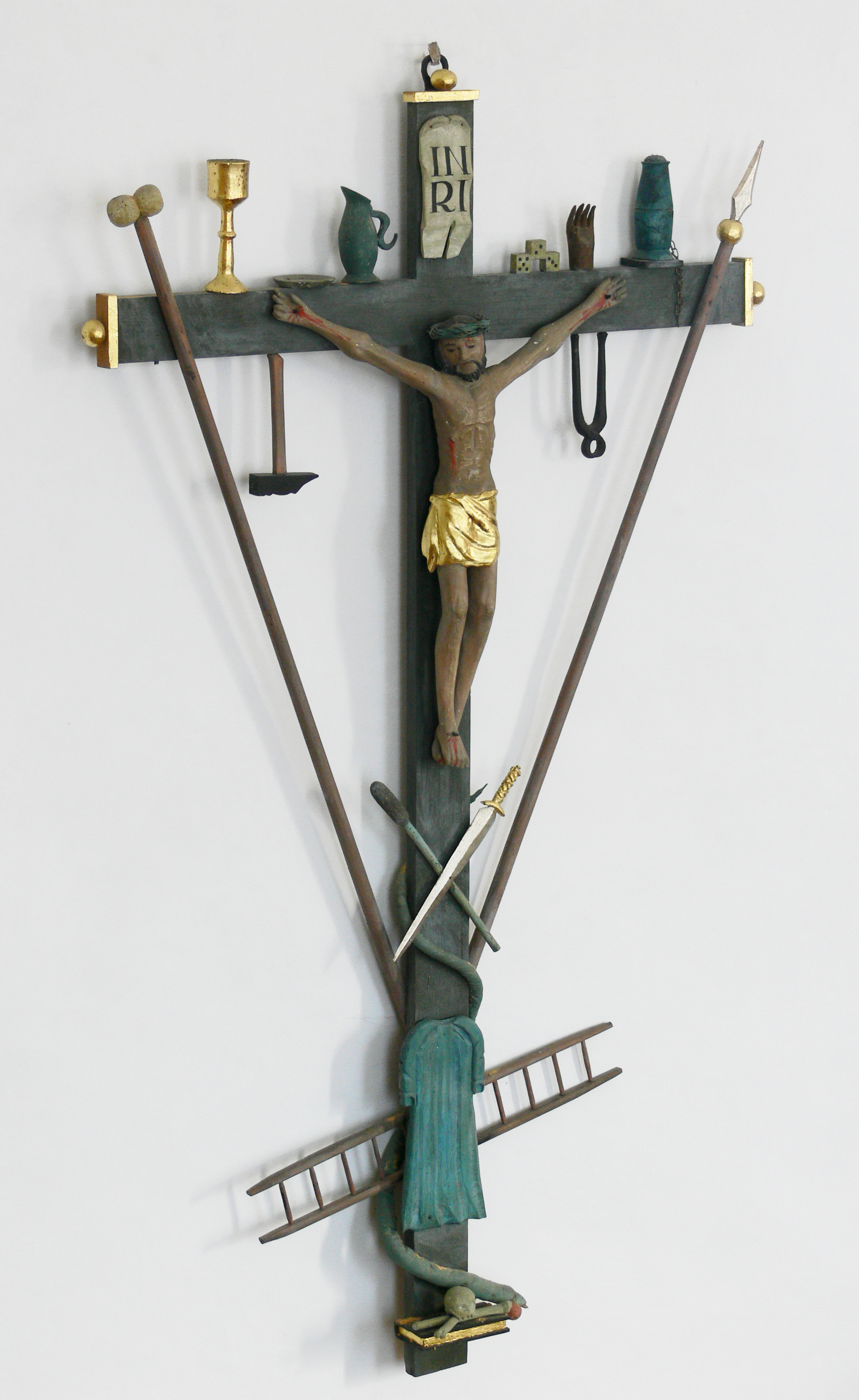
Arma Christi crucifix, St. Wendelin, Bremenried, Weiler-Simmerberg, Bavaria

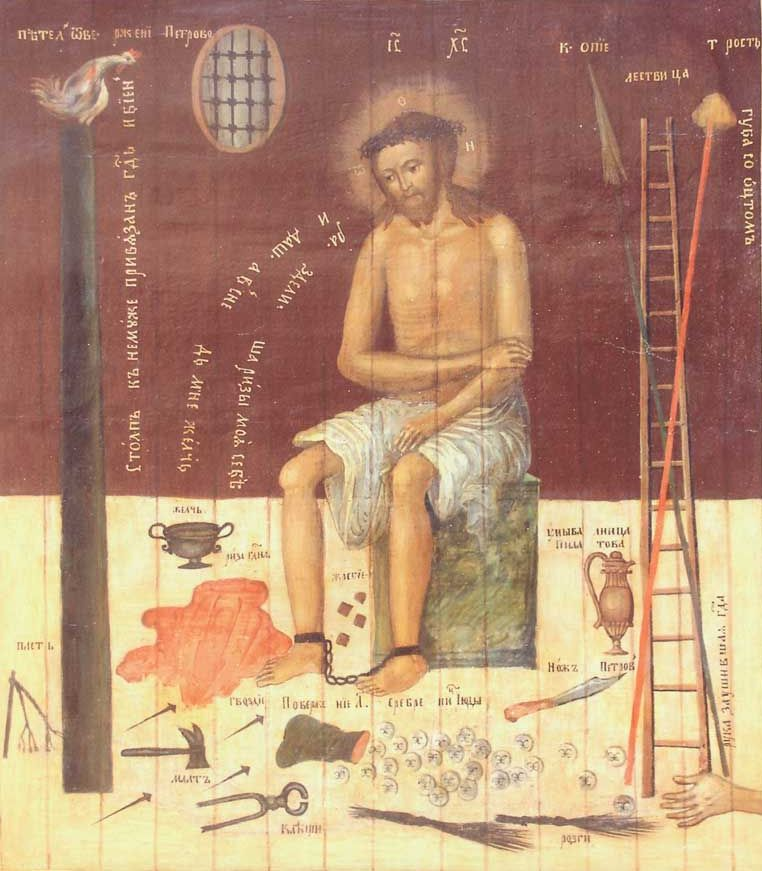
Christ in the dark with the Arma Christi, 19th-century Russian icon

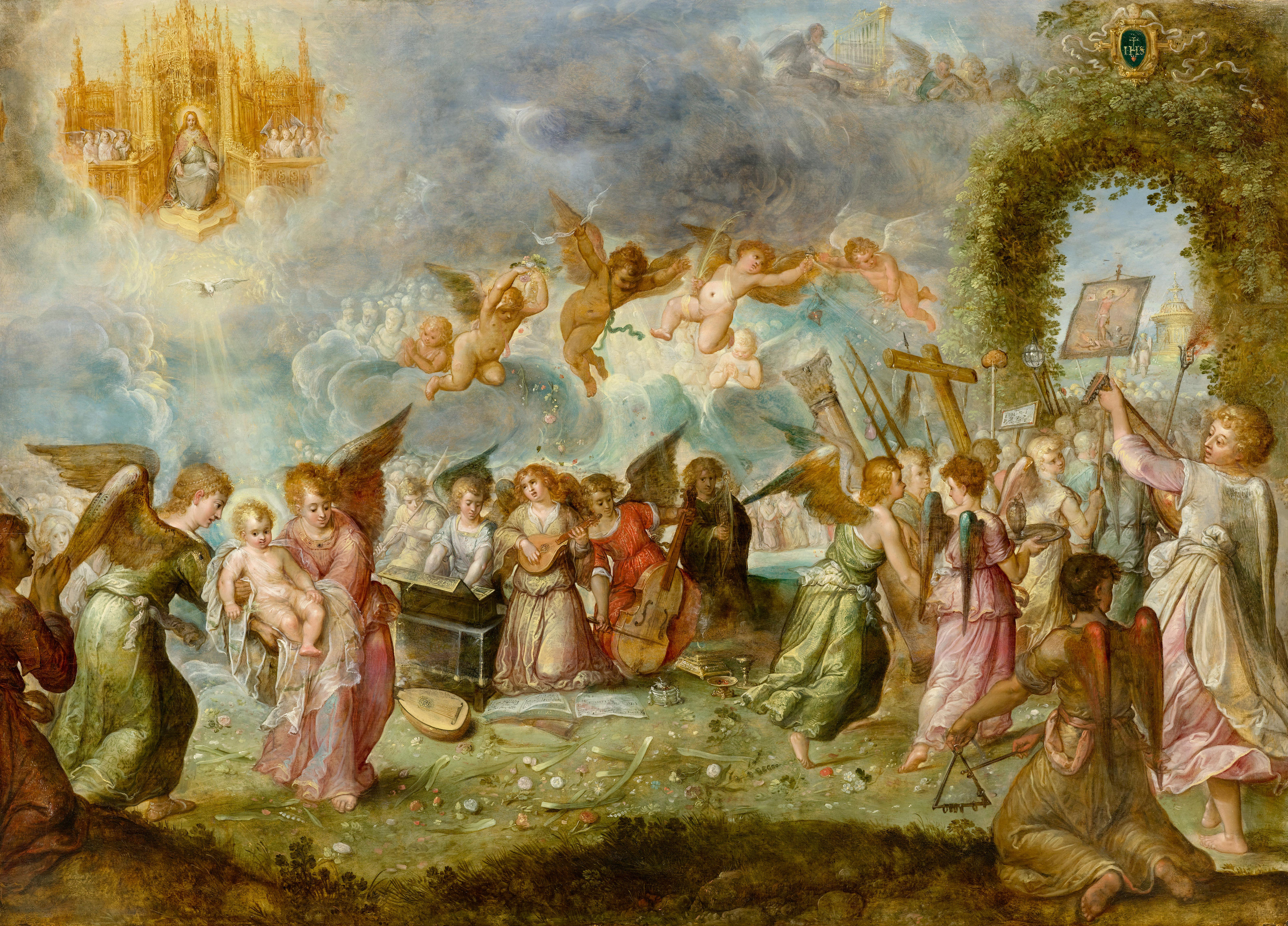
Triumph of the Christ Child by Ambrosius Francken I, 1605–10, Angels carry away the Arma Christi.

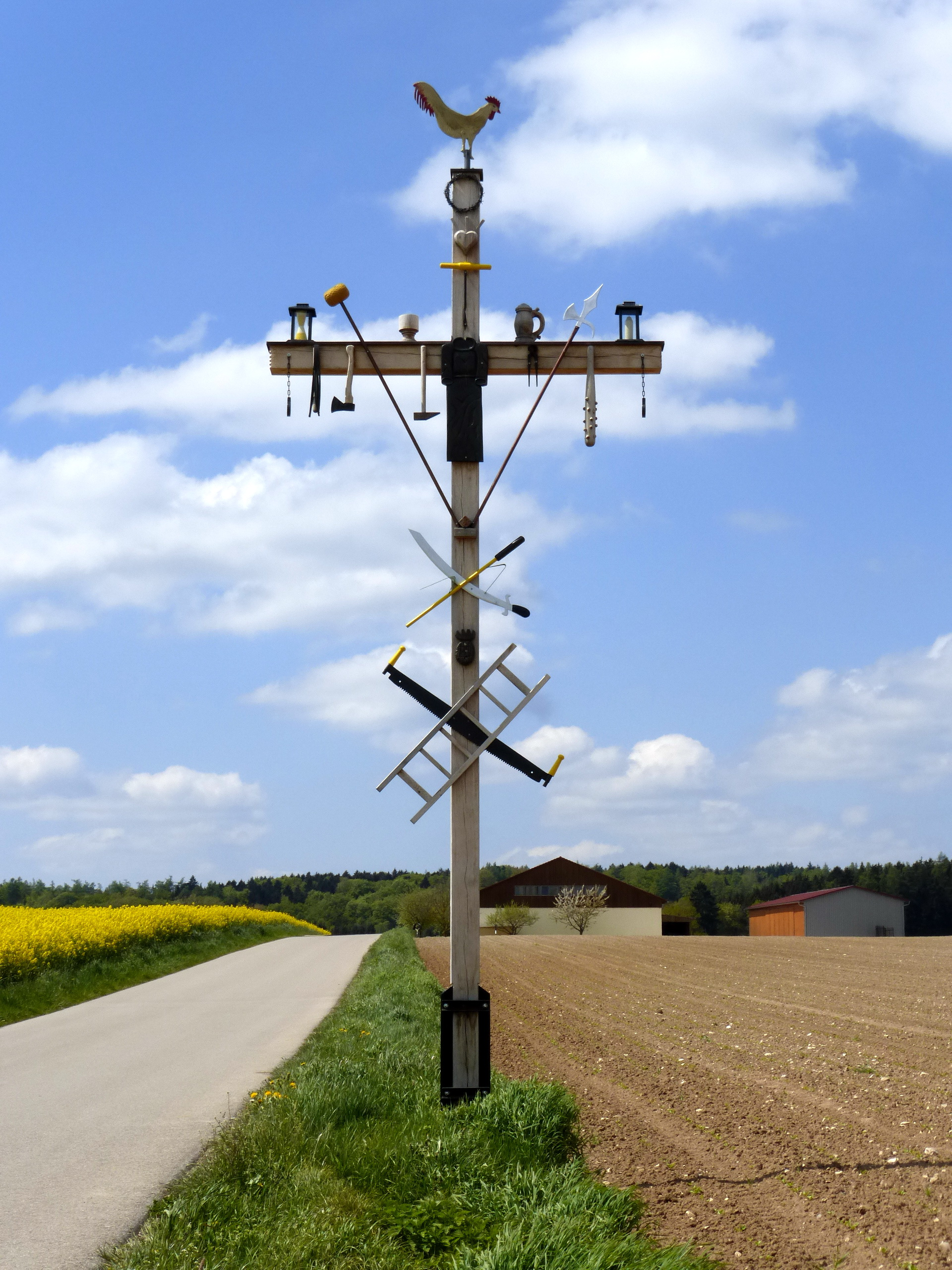
Wayside cross with the Arma Christi near Stammham, Eichstätt

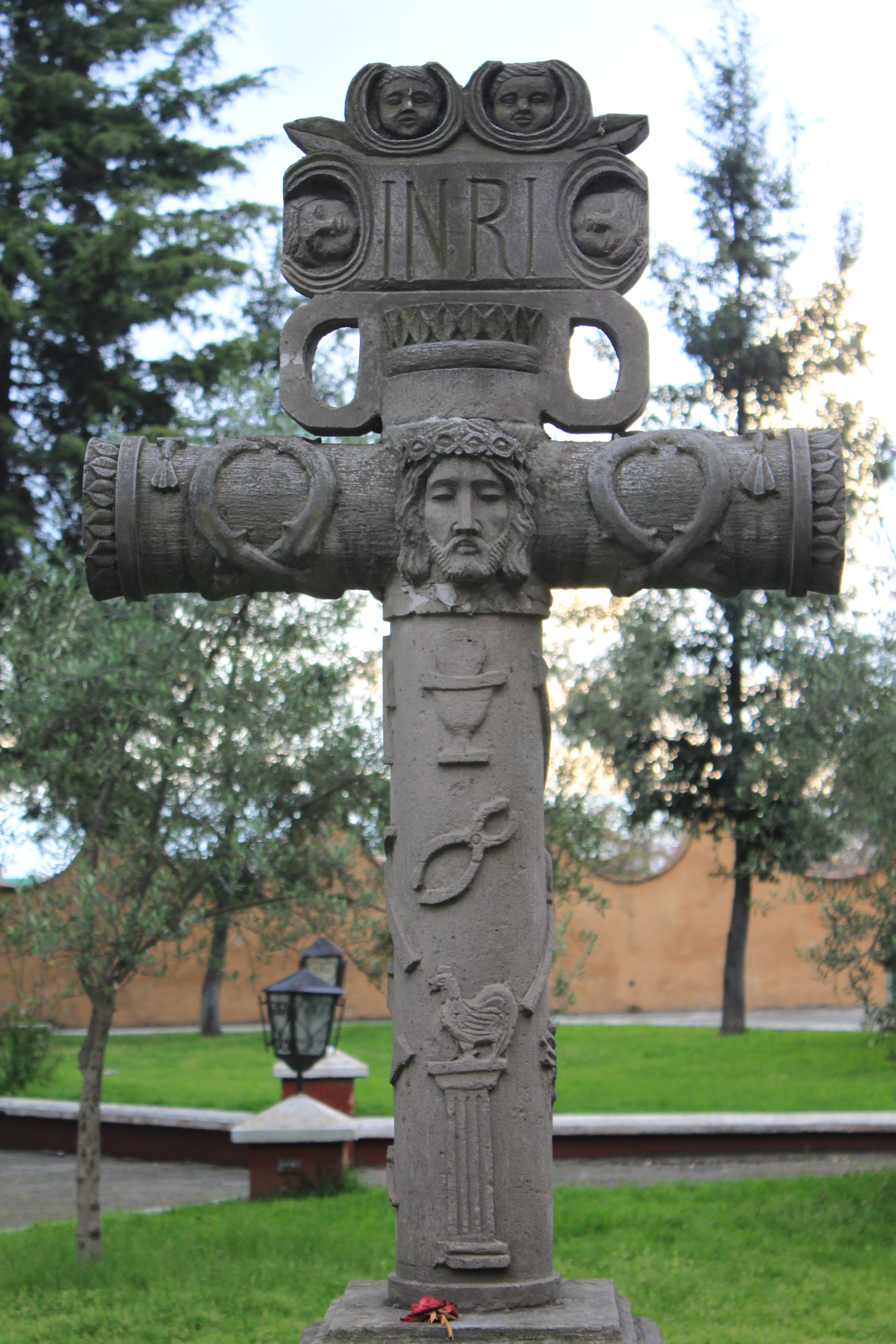
Atrial crosses, such as this one in Metepec, Mexico, usually include the Arma Christi.

== See also ==
- Attributed arms
- Pont Sant'Angelo
- Relics associated with Jesus
- Scutum Fidei (the medieval heraldic arms of the Trinity)
- Great Schema
