= Holy Chalice =

Vessel that Jesus used at the Last Supper to serve wine

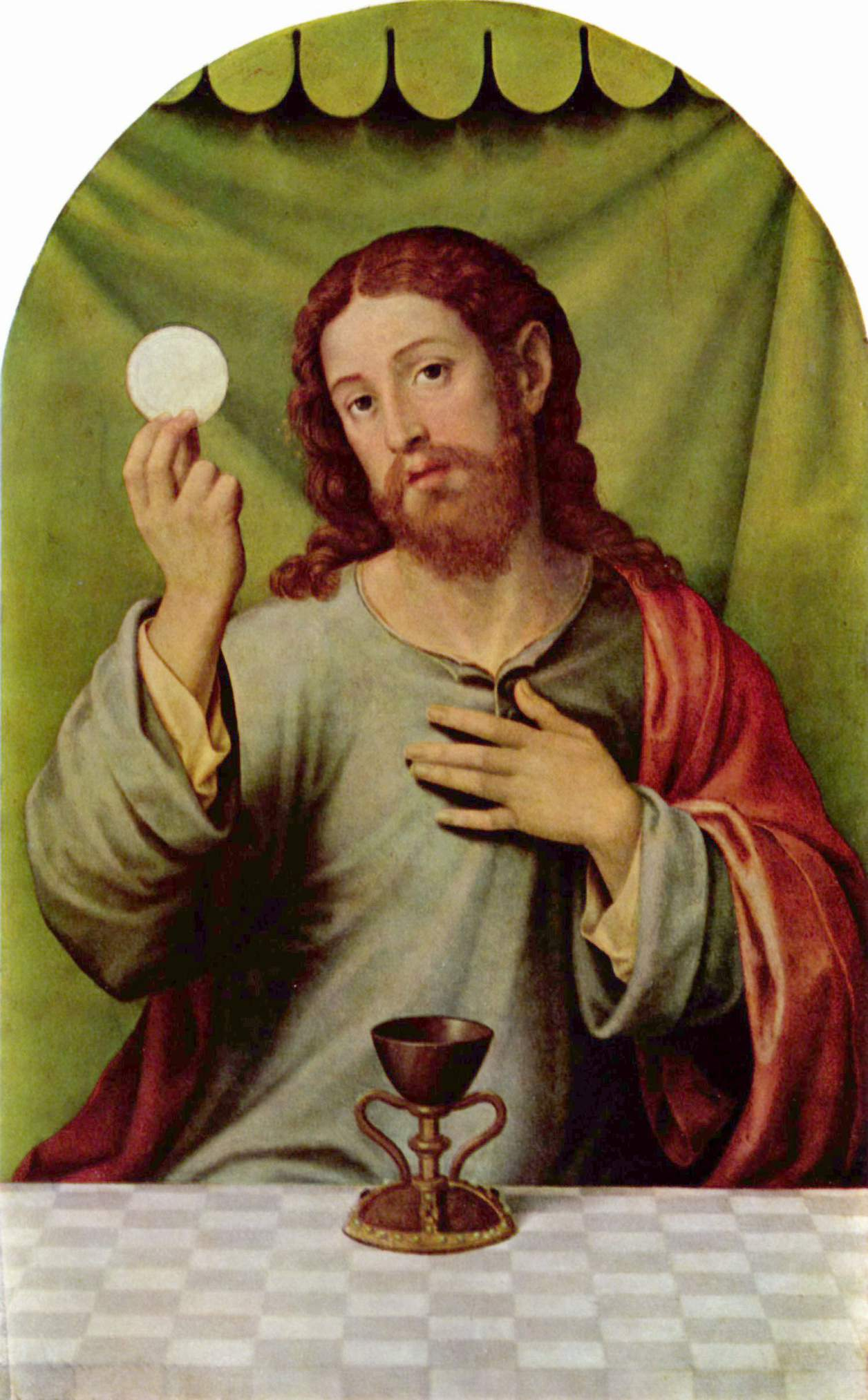
Christ of the Eucharist by Juan de Juanes. This 16th-century painting depicts the Valencia Chalice

The Holy Chalice, also known as the Holy Grail, is in some Christian traditions the vessel that Jesus used at the Last Supper to share his blood. The Synoptic Gospels refer to Jesus sharing a cup of wine with the Apostles, saying it was the covenant in his blood. The use of wine and chalice in the Eucharist in Christian churches is based on the Last Supper event. In the late 12th century, the author Robert de Boron associated the pre-existing story of the Holy Grail, a magical item from Arthurian literature, with the Holy Chalice. This association was continued in many subsequent Arthurian works, including the Lancelot-Grail (Vulgate) cycle, the Post-Vulgate Cycle, and Sir Thomas Malory's Le Morte d'Arthur. A cup kept in the Spanish Cathedral of Valencia has been identified since medieval times as the purported Holy Chalice used at the Last Supper.

== Last Supper ==
The Gospel of Matthew (26:27–29) says:

And He took a cup and when He had given thanks He gave it to them saying "Drink this, all of you; for this is My blood of the covenant, which is poured out for many for the forgiveness of sins. I tell you, I shall not drink again of the fruit of the vine until I drink it new with you in My Father's kingdom."

This incident, traditionally known as the Last Supper, is also described by the gospel writers, Mark and Luke, and by the Apostle Paul in I Corinthians. With the preceding description of the breaking of bread, it is the foundation for the Eucharist or Holy Communion, celebrated regularly in many Christian churches. Except within the context of the Last Supper, the Bible makes no mention of the cup, and ascribes no significance whatsoever to the object itself.

St. John Chrysostom (347–407 AD) in his homily on Matthew asserted:

The table was not of silver, the chalice was not of gold in which Christ gave His blood to His disciples to drink, and yet everything there was precious and truly fit to inspire awe.

The pilgrim Antoninus of Piacenza (570 AD) in his descriptions of the holy places of Jerusalem, said that he saw "the cup of onyx, which our Lord blessed at the last supper" among many relics displayed at the Basilica erected by Constantine near to Golgotha and the Tomb of Christ.

Herbert Thurston in the Catholic Encyclopedia (1908) concluded that:

No reliable tradition has been preserved to us regarding the vessel used by Christ at the Last Supper. In the sixth and seventh centuries pilgrims to Jerusalem were led to believe that the actual chalice was still venerated in the church of the Holy Sepulchre, having within it the sponge which was presented to Our Saviour on Calvary.

== Medieval tradition ==
=== Iconography ===
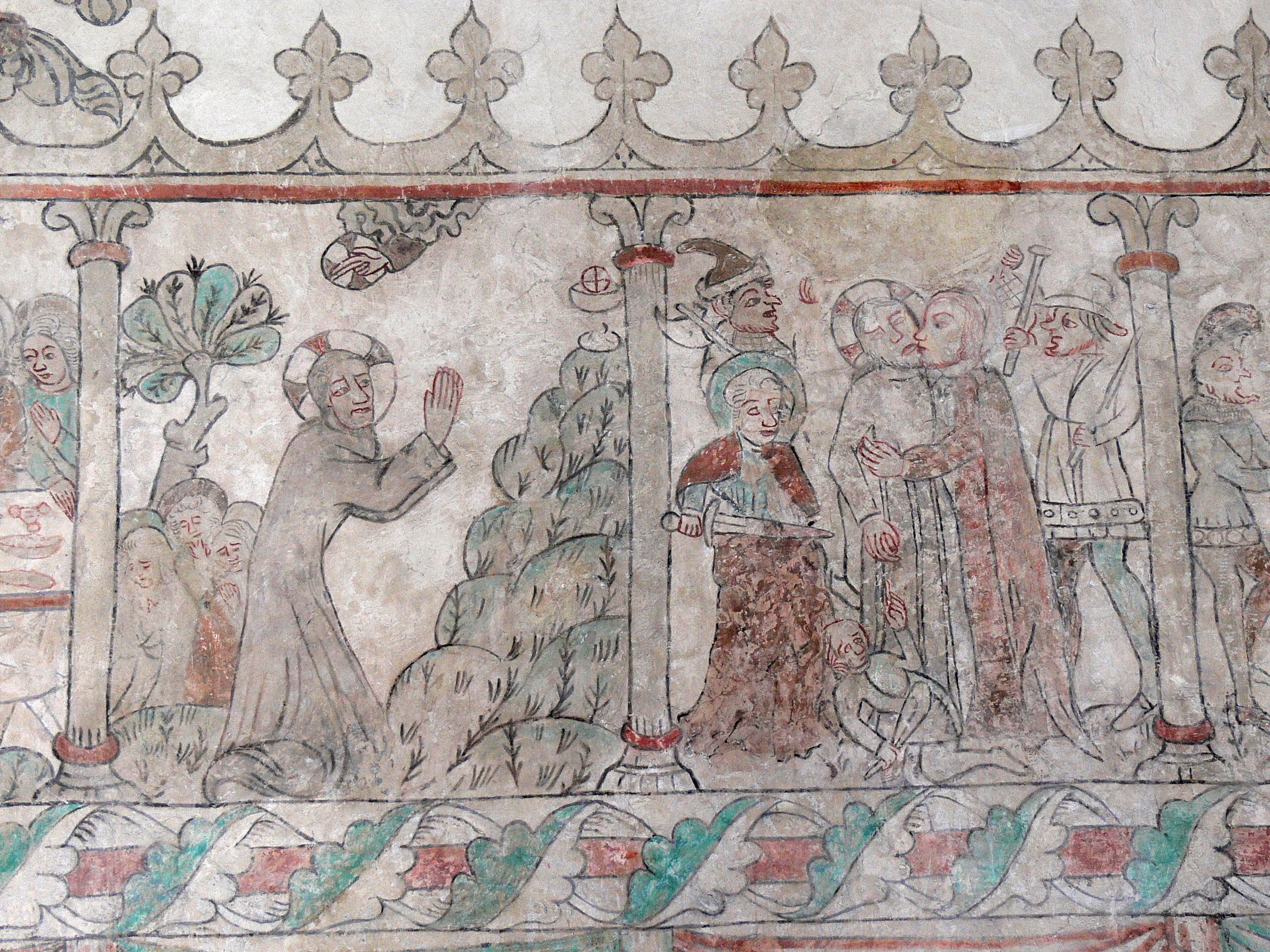
Two episodes from the Passion-cycle murals of Öja Church, Gotland.

The iconic significance of the Chalice grew during the Early Middle Ages. Depictions of Jesus praying in the Garden of Gethsemane, such as that in the fourteenth-century frescoes of the church at Öja, Gotland (illustration, right), show a prefigured apparition of the Holy Chalice that stands at the top of the mountain, illustrating the words "Let this cup be taken from me". Together with the halo-enveloped Hand of God and the haloed figure of Jesus, the halo image atop the chalice, as if of a consecrated Host, completes the Trinity by embodying the Holy Spirit.

=== Holy Grail ===
The Holy Grail appears as a miraculous artifact in Arthurian legend in the 12th century, and is soon associated with the Holy Chalice.

The "Grail" became interwoven with the legend of the Holy Chalice. The connection of the Holy Chalice with Joseph of Arimathea dates from Robert de Boron's Joseph d'Arimathie (late 12th century). The fully developed "Grail legend" of the 13th century identifies the Holy Grail with the Holy Chalice used in the Last Supper and later used to collect Christ's blood, brought to Hispania by Joseph of Arimathea.

=== Medieval relics ===
In the account of Arculf, a 7th-century Anglo-Saxon pilgrim, mention is made of a chalice venerated as the one used in the Last Supper in a chapel near Jerusalem.

It is also mentioned in the account of The Anonymous pilgrim of Piacenza, when traveling through Jerusalem in the 570s.

Two artifacts were claimed as the Holy Chalice in Western Christianity in the later medieval period. The first is the Sant Calze, an agate cup in the Cathedral of Valencia, purportedly from around the 1st century AD, and celebrated by Pope Benedict XVI in 2006 as "this most famous chalice" (hunc praeclarum Calicem); Valencia's Holy Chalice is the object most commonly identified as a claimant to being the Holy Grail. The second is the Sacro Catino in Genoa Cathedral, a flat dish made of green glass; recovered from Caesarea in 1101, it was not identified as the Holy Chalice until much later, towards the end of the 13th century.

==== Valencia Chalice ====
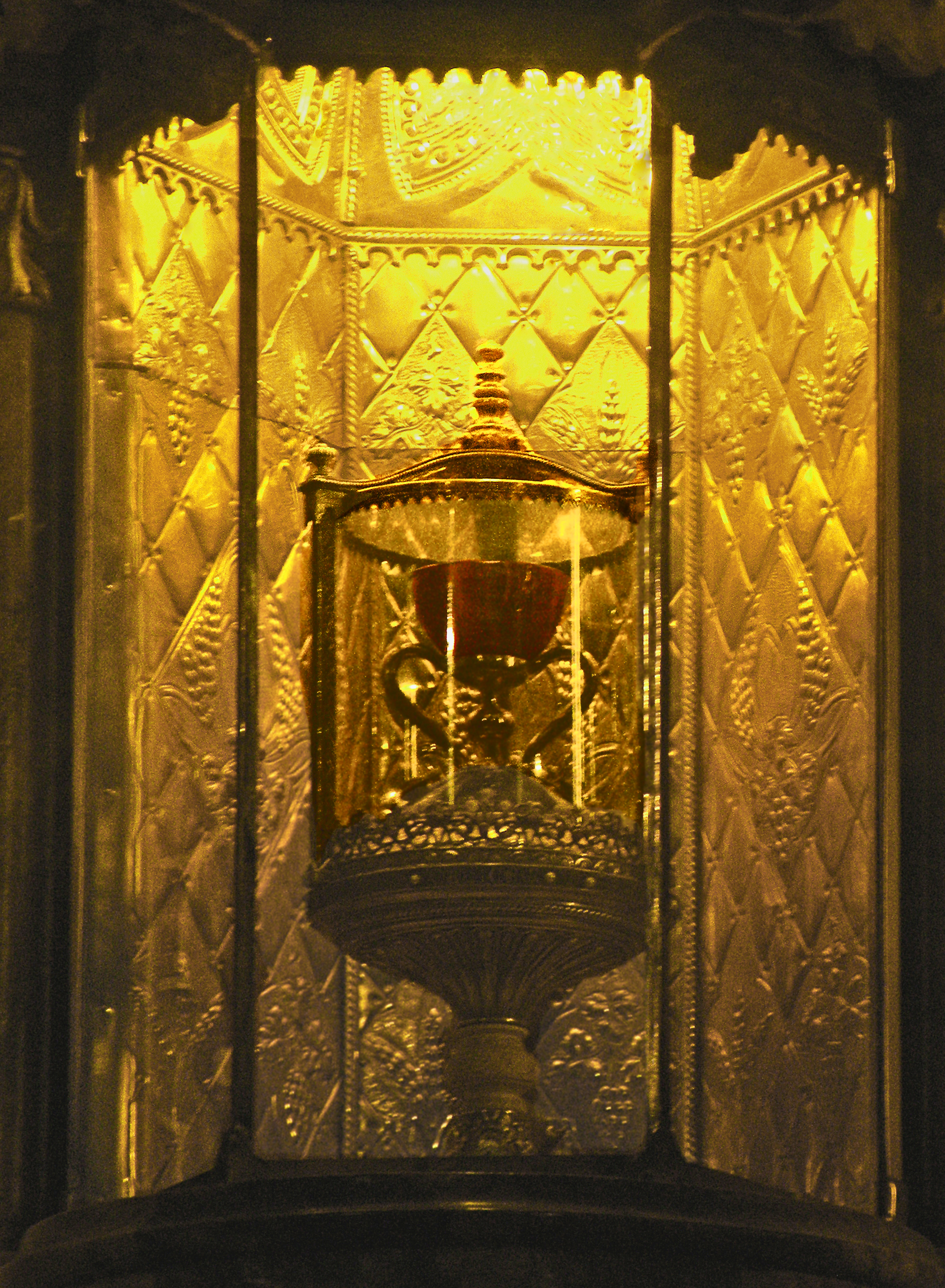
The Valencia Chalice in its chapel in Valencia Cathedral

The Holy Chalice (Spanish: Santo Cáliz) is an agate cup preserved in the Cathedral of Valencia. The chalice is commonly credited as being the actual Holy Grail used by Jesus during the Last Supper and is preserved in a chapel consecrated to it, where it still attracts the faithful on pilgrimage. The artifact has seemingly never been accredited with supernatural powers.

The cup is made of dark red agate which is mounted by means of a knobbed stem and two curved handles onto a base made from an inverted cup of chalcedony. The agate cup is about 9 centimeters (3.5 inches) in diameter and the total height, including base, is about 17 centimetres (7 inches) high. The base, stems and handles are later additions purportedly medieval, with the lower part added 'Arabic looking' inscription. The red agate cup itself (the chalice) was most likely produced in a Levantine or Egyptian workshop between the 2nd century BC and the 1st century AD.

It is kept together with an inventory list on vellum, said to have accompanied a lost letter which detailed state-sponsored Roman persecution of Christians that forced the church to split up its treasury and hide it with members, specifically the deacon Saint Lawrence.

The first explicit inventory reference to the present Chalice of Valencia is found in an inventory of the treasury of the monastery of San Juan de la Peña drawn up by Don Carreras Ramírez, Canon of Zaragoza, on 14 December 1134. The Chalice is described as the vessel in which "Christ Our Lord consecrated his blood" (En un arca de marfil está el Cáliz en que Cristo N. Señor consagró su sangre, el cual envió S. Lorenzo a su patria, Huesca).

Reference to the chalice is made again in 1399, when it was given by the monastery of San Juan de la Peña to king Martin I of Aragon in exchange for a gold cup.

Pope John Paul II celebrated Mass with the Holy Chalice in Valencia in November 1982, and in that occasion the Pope referred to it as "a witness to Christ's passage on Earth". In July 2006, at the closing Mass of the 5th World Meeting of Families in Valencia, Pope Benedict XVI also celebrated Mass with the Holy Chalice, on this occasion calling it "this most famous chalice" (hunc praeclarum Calicem), words in the Roman Canon said to have been used for the first popes to refer to the Holy Grail until the 4th century in Rome.

==== Genoa Dish ====
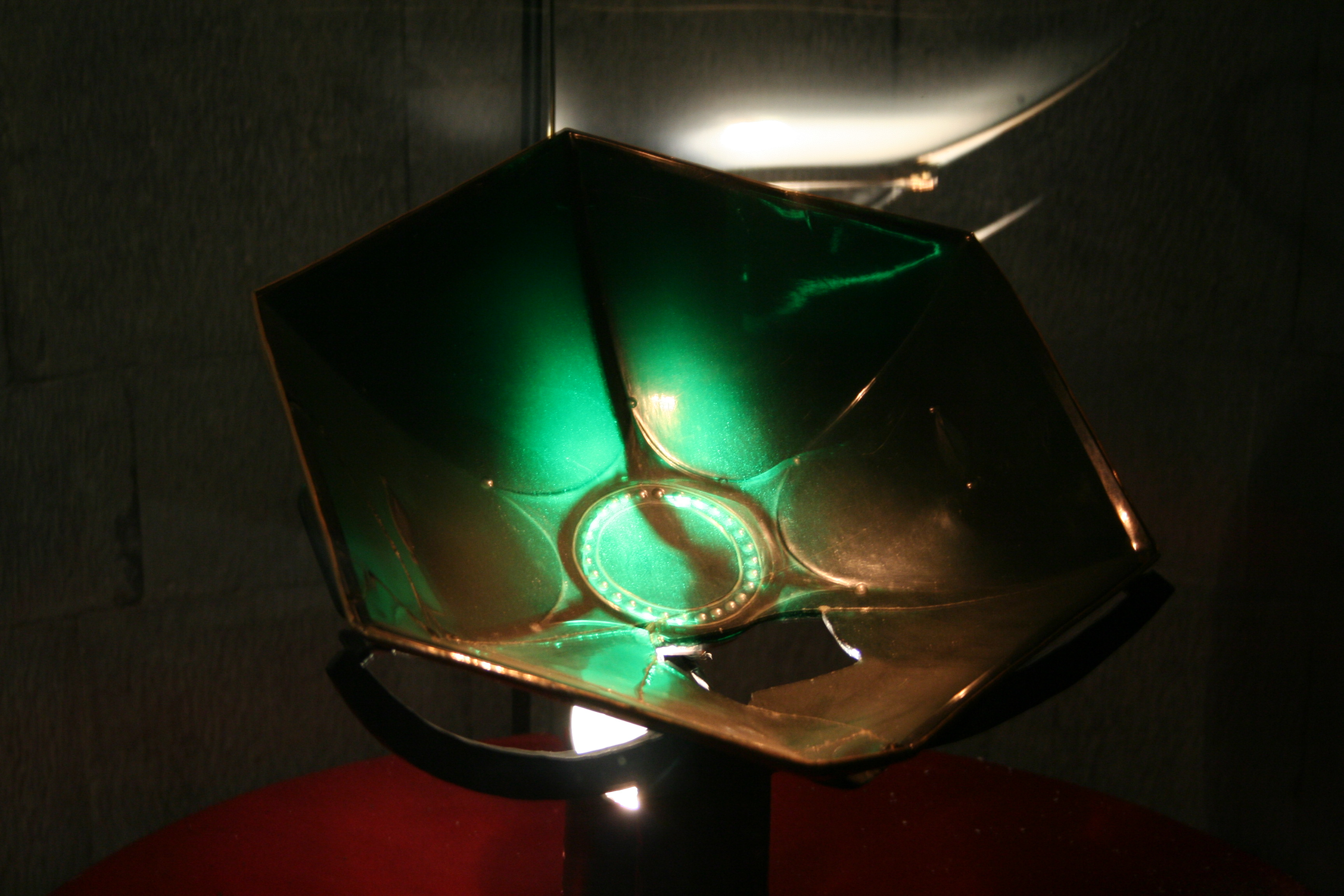
The Genoa Chalice

The Sacro Catino ("Sacred Basin"), kept in Genoa Cathedral, is a hexagonal dish made of green Egyptian glass, some 9 cm high and 33 cm across. It was taken to Genoa by Guglielmo Embriaco as part of the spoils from the conquest of Caesarea in 1101. William of Tyre (10.16) describes it as a "vessel of the most green colour, in the shape of a serving dish" (vas coloris viridissimi, in modum parapsidis formatum) which the Genoese thought to be made of emerald, and accepted as their share of the spoils. William states that the Genoese were still exhibiting the bowl, insisting on its miraculous properties due to its being made of emerald, in his own day (Unde et usque hodie transeuntibus per eos magnatibus, vas idem quasi pro miraculo solent ostendere, persuadentes quod vere sit, id quod color esse indicat, smaragdus), the implication being that emerald was thought to have miraculous properties of its own in medieval lore, and not that the bowl was thought of as a holy relic. The Sacro Catino would later become identified as the Holy Grail. The first explicit claim to this effect is found in the Chronicon by Jacobus de Voragine, written in the 1290s. Pedro Tafur, who visited Genoa in 1436, reported that the Holy Grail, "made of a single emerald" is kept in Genoa Cathedral.

The bowl was seized and taken to Paris by Napoleon in 1805, and it was damaged when it was returned to Genoa in 1816, on which occasion it was confirmed it is made of glass rather than emerald. It was the subject of various restorations, in 1908, 1951, and 2017.

The study of the object made during the period of presence in France by the Académie des sciences of the Institut de France established that it was a Byzantine crystal, and not emerald. Modern studies consider it to be an Islamic artifact of the 9th–10th century.

== Modern candidates ==
Aside from the Holy Chalice of the Cathedral of Valencia, a number of other artifacts of greater or lesser notability have come to be identified with the "Holy Grail" or "Holy Chalice", beginning with the rising popularity of the Grail legend in 19th-century Romanticism.

=== Chalice of Doña Urraca ===
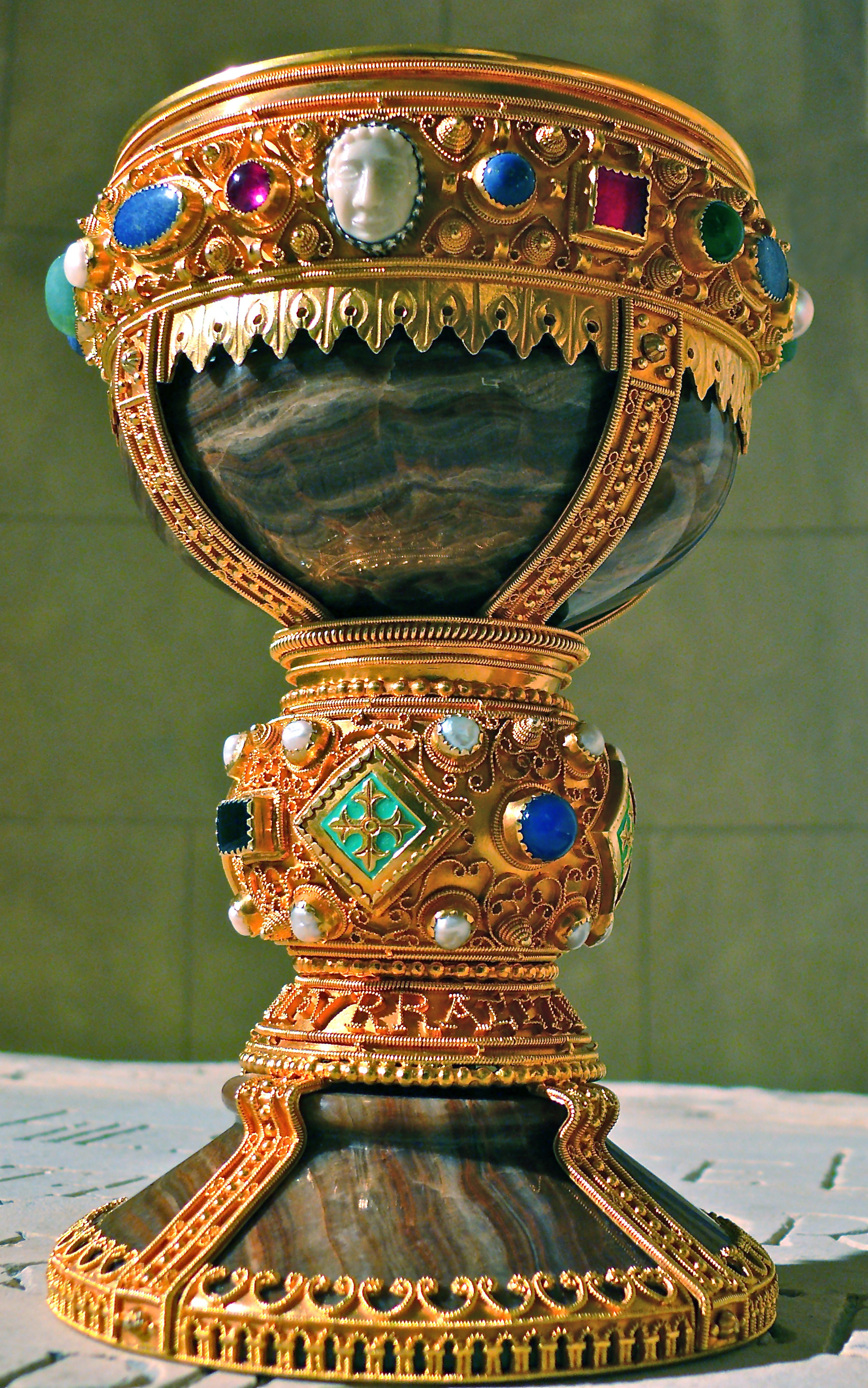
A replica of the Chalice of Doña Urraca.

The Chalice of Doña Urraca is an artifact kept in St. Isidore's Basilica in León, Spain. The connection of this artifact to the Holy Grail was made in the 2014 book Los Reyes del Grial, which develops the hypothesis that this artifact had been taken by Egyptian troops following the invasion of Jerusalem and the looting of the Church of the Holy Sepulchre, then given by the Emir of Egypt to the Emir of Denia, who in the 11th century gave it to the Kings of Leon for them to spare his city in the Reconquista.

=== Antioch Chalice ===
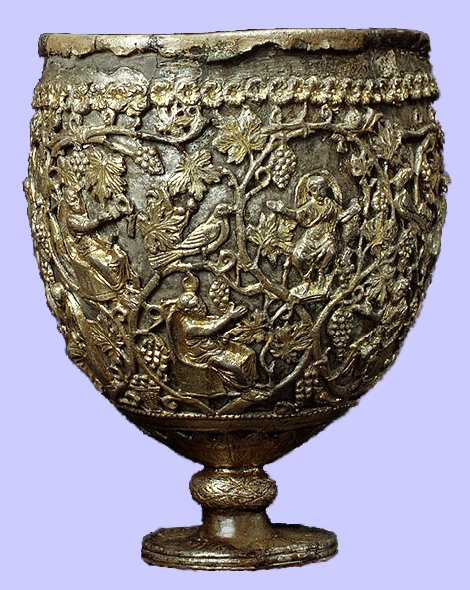
Antioch Chalice, first half of the 6th century, Metropolitan Museum of Art

This silver-gilt object is in the collection of the Metropolitan Museum of Art in New York City. It was apparently made at Antioch in the early 6th century, and is of double-cup construction, with an outer shell of cast-metal open work, enclosing a plain silver inner cup. When it was first recovered in Antioch in 1910, it was touted as the Holy Chalice, an identification the Metropolitan Museum characterizes as "ambitious". It is no longer identified as a chalice, having been identified by experts at the Walters Art Museum in Baltimore as likely a standing lamp, in a style of the 6th century.

=== Nanteos Cup ===
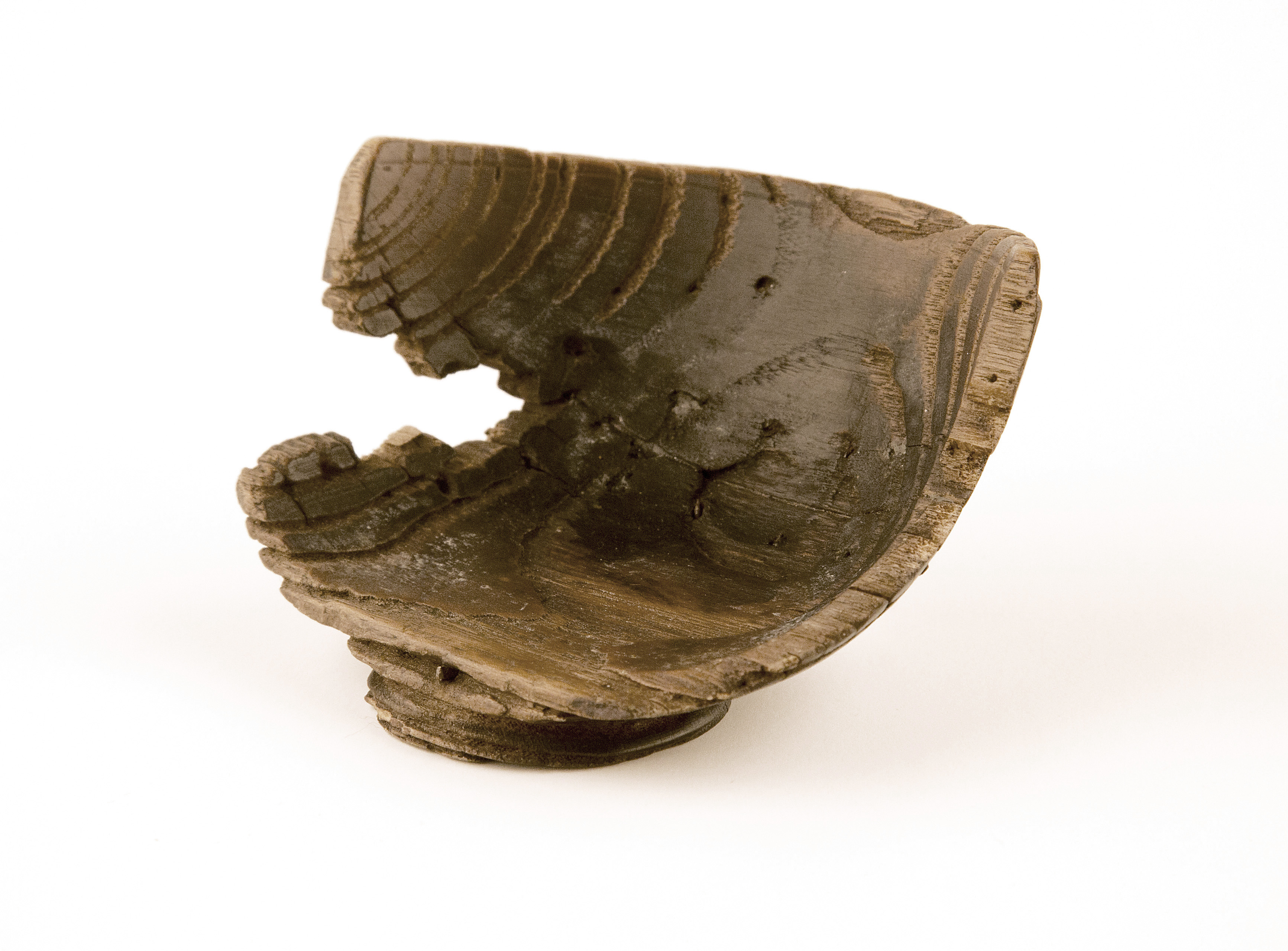
The Nanteos cup fragment

The Nanteos Cup is a medieval wood mazer bowl, held for many years at Nanteos Mansion, Rhydyfelin, near Aberystwyth in Wales. It is recorded as having been attributed miraculous powers of healing in the late 19th century, and tradition apparently held it had been made from a piece of the True Cross at the time, but it came to be identified as the Holy Chalice in the early 20th century.

== See also ==
- Holy Grail
- Holy Prepuce
- Holyrood (cross)
- Holy Sponge
- Holy Qurbana
- Holy Qurobo
- Nail (relic)
- Relics associated with Jesus
- Sandals of Jesus Christ
- San Juan de la Peña
- Shroud of Turin
- Titulus Crucis
- Tree of Jesse
- True Cross

== Bibliography ==
- Salvador Antuñano Alea, Truth and Symbolism of Holy Grail: Revelations Surrounding Valencia's Sacred Chalice (in Spanish, with a prologue by Archbishop Agustin Garcia Gasco of Valencia), 1999
- Strzygowski, Josef, L'ancien art chrétien de Syrie, Paris, E. de Boccard, 1936.
- Relics of the Passion, 2005, History Channel video documentary
- Catholic Encyclopedia: Chalice (illustration of the Holy Chalice of Valencia)
- Weitzmann, Kurt, ed., Age of spirituality: late antique and early Christian art, third to seventh century, no. 542, 1979, Metropolitan Museum of Art, New York, ISBN 9780870991790; full text available online from The Metropolitan Museum of Art Libraries.
