= Anonymous pilgrim of Piacenza =

Unidentified Christian pilgrim

The anonymous pilgrim of Piacenza, sometimes simply called the Piacenza Pilgrim, was a sixth-century Christian pilgrim from Piacenza in northern Italy who travelled to the Holy Land at the height of Byzantine rule in the 570s and wrote a narrative - an itinerarium - of his pilgrimage.

== Misidentification as Antoninus of Piacenza ==
This anonymous pilgrim was erroneously identified as Antoninus of Piacenza or Antoninus Martyr out of confusion with Saint Antoninus of Piacenza, who died in 303 and is venerated as a martyr.

== Pilgrimage ==
The pilgrim travelled from Piacenza via Constantinople and Cyprus to Tripolis. From there, he travelled south via Beirut and Tyrus before turning towards Galilea where he visited Nazareth and Capernaum before going through Samaria towards the Jordan River where he visited at Epiphany the alleged site where Jesus was baptised. He then proceeded towards Jerusalem, where his descriptions of the chalice of onyx that was venerated in the Church of the Holy Sepulchre and of the Holy Lance in the Basilica of Mount Zion are early attestations of the cultus of these two relics. He then travelled towards the coast and passed through Gaza, where he mentioned the tomb of Hilarion and took then the road towards the Mount Sinai.

The pilgrim also brought back many objects he had collected from the holy places, a feature typical of visiting pilgrims. However, the pilgrim seems to have been very enthusiastic about them. These objects included medicinal herbs, earth, oil from the Church of the Holy Sepulchre, and stones.

The pilgrim's itinerary documents the extent of the sixth-century trade catering to the pious pilgrims in the Holy Land: "We went to Cana, where our Lord was present at the marriage feast," the Piacenza Pilgrim reports, "and we reclined on the very couch." Inspired by such a vivid figuration of Biblical truth, Antoninus indulged the classic tourists' act: "and there, unworthy as I was, I wrote the names of my parents". A block of marble found at Elateia, inscribed in Byzantine Greek, "This stone is from Cana in Galilee, where Our Lord Jesus Christ turned the water into wine" and the further inscription, "Antoninus", was identified with the Piacenzan when the block was moved to the Little Metropolis near the Metropolitan Cathedral of Athens.

Although he covered in his travels nearly the same extensive territory as the Egeria of Hispania, his work contains but few details not found in other writers. It is also marred by gross errors and fabulous tales betraying the most naive credulity.

== Importance ==
The Piacenza pilgrim's description of sites and traditions are sometimes inaccurate, as he tends to confuse places from the same area, or such which are in Egypt. Though his travel covered mostly the same territory as of other pilgrims (such as of Egeria), the travel descriptions of the Piacenza pilgrim are still valued by researchers because they sometimes contain information about local customs and traditions not mentioned in any other text and he was the last writer to visit the Holy Land before the Muslim conquest.

== Editions ==
- P. Geyer (ed.), in Itineraria et alia geographica, Corpus Christianorum series Latina, Volume 175 (Turnhout: Brepols, 1965), pp. 129–53.
- Aubrey Stewart (trans.), Of the Holy Places Visited by Antoninus Martyr, Palestine Pilgrims' Text Society, 1887.

== See also ==
Chronological list of early Christian geographers and pilgrims to the Holy Land who wrote about their travels, and other related works

Late Roman and Byzantine period

- Eusebius of Caesarea (260/65–339/40), Church historian and geographer of the Holy Land
- Anonymous "Pilgrim of Bordeaux", pilgrim to the Holy Land (333–4) who left travel descriptions
- Egeria, pilgrim to the Holy Land (c. 381–384) who left a detailed travel account
- St Jerome (Hieronymus; fl. 386–420), translator of the Bible, brought an important contribution to the topography of the Holy Land
- Madaba Map, mosaic map of the Holy Land from the second half of the 6th century

Early Muslim period

- Paschal Chronicle, 7th-century Greek Christian chronicle of the world
- Arculf, pilgrim to the Holy Land (c. 680) who left a detailed narrative of his travels

Medieval period

- John of Würzburg, pilgrim to the Holy Land (1160s) who left travel descriptions,
