= Relics associated with Jesus =

A number of alleged relics associated with Jesus have been displayed throughout the history of Christianity. While some individuals believe in the authenticity of Jesus relics, others doubt their validity. For instance, the sixteenth-century philosopher Erasmus wrote about the proliferation of relics, and the number of buildings that could be constructed from wooden relics claimed to be from the crucifixion cross of Jesus. Similarly, at least thirty Holy Nails were venerated as relics across Europe in the early 20th century. Part of the relics are included in the so-called Arma Christi ("Weapons of Christ"), or the Instruments of the Passion.

Some of the relics, such as remnants of the crown of thorns, receive only a modest number of pilgrims, while others, such as the Shroud of Turin, receive millions of pilgrims, including Pope John Paul II, Pope Benedict XVI, and Pope Francis.

As Christian teachings generally state that Christ ascended into heaven corporeally, there are few bodily relics apart from those described as being removed or expelled from Christ's body prior to his ascension, such as the Holy Prepuce or the blood of the Oviedo Shroud.

== The True Cross ==
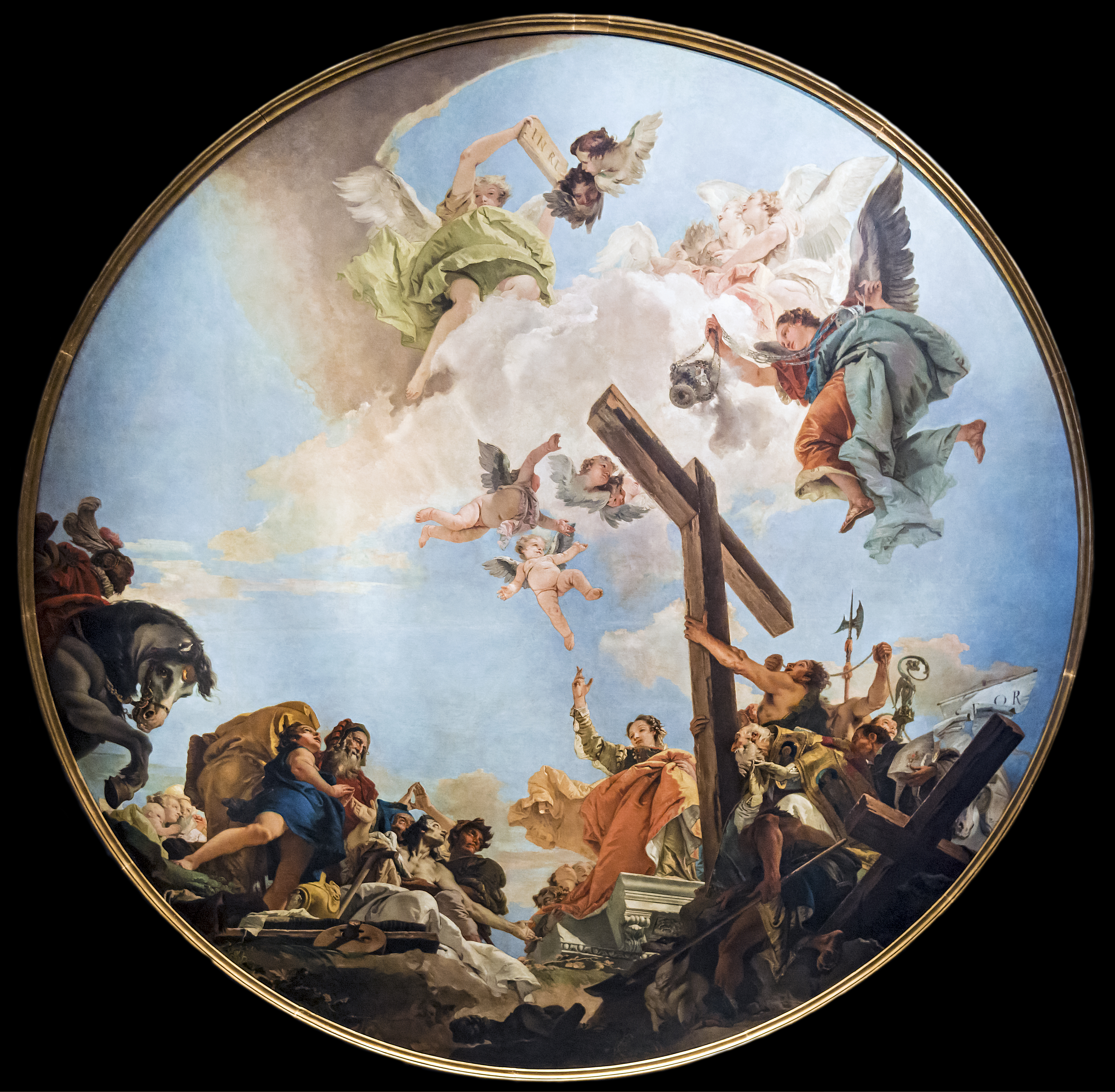
Discovery of the True Cross, by Tiepolo, 1745

The "True Cross" refers to the actual cross used in the Crucifixion of Jesus. Today, many fragments of wood are claimed as True Cross relics, but it is hard to establish their authenticity. The story of the fourth-century discovery of the True Cross was reported in Jacobus de Voragine's The Golden Legend published in 1260, that included the lore of saints venerated at the time.

Tradition and legends attribute the discovery of the True Cross to Helena, mother of Constantine the Great who went to Syria Palaestina during the fourth century in search of relics. Eusebius of Caesarea was the only contemporary author to write about Helena's journey in his Life of Constantine. But Eusebius did not mention the True Cross, although he dwelt on the piety of Helena and her reporting the site of the Holy Sepulchre. In the fifth century writings by Socrates Scholasticus, Sozomen and Theodoret report on the finding of the True Cross.

Pieces of the purported True Cross, including half of the INRI inscription tablet, are preserved at the basilica Santa Croce in Gerusalemme in Rome. Other small pieces of the True Cross are reportedly preserved in hundreds of other European churches. The authenticity of the relics and the accuracy of reports of finding the True Cross is not accepted by all Christians. The belief in the Early Christian Church tradition regarding the True Cross is generally restricted to the Catholic and Eastern Orthodox Churches. The medieval legends of the True Cross provenance differ between Catholic and Eastern Orthodox tradition. These churches honor Helena as a saint, as does also the Anglican Communion.

== Acheiropoieta ==
A number of acheiropoieta (lit. 'made without hand'; icons not made by hand) images reported to be of the face or body of Jesus impressed on cloth have been displayed. In many cases these images are subject to intense debate and speculation. Although devotions to the face of Jesus are practiced, the term "Holy Face of Jesus" relates to the specific devotions approved by Pope Leo XIII in 1895 and Pope Pius XII in 1958 for the image from the Shroud of Turin.

=== Shroud of Turin ===
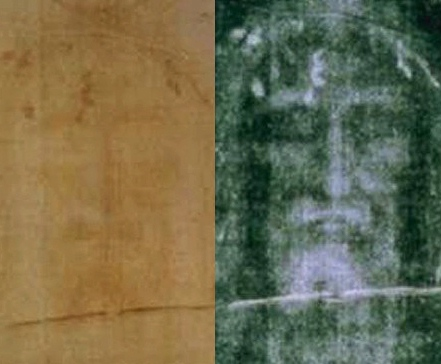
A photo of the Shroud of Turin face, positive left, negative on the right, having been contrast enhanced

The Shroud of Turin is the best-known and most intensively studied relic of Jesus.

In 1988, radiocarbon dating determined that the shroud was from the Middle Ages, between the years 1260 and 1390.

=== Sudarium of Oviedo ===
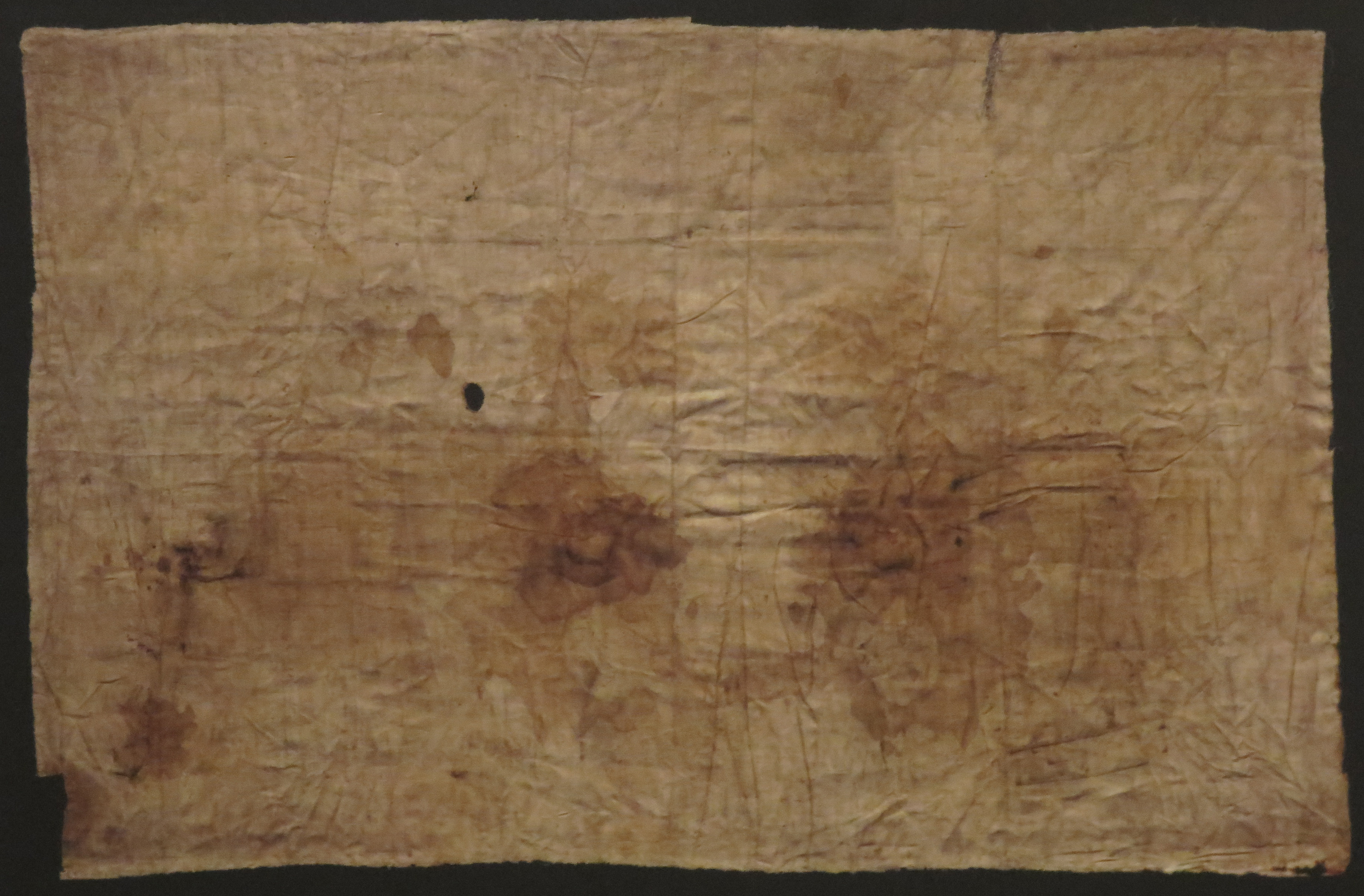
The Sudarium of Oviedo

The Sudarium of Oviedo is a bloodstained cloth, measuring 84 cm × 53 cm (33 in × 21 in), curated in the Cámara Santa of the Cathedral of San Salvador, Oviedo, Spain. The Sudarium (Latin for "sweat cloth") is purportedly the cloth wrapped around the head of Jesus Christ after he died, noted in the Gospel of John (20:6–7).

The Sudarium is soiled and crumpled, with dark flecks that are symmetrically arranged but do not form an image as with the Shroud of Turin. Proponents for the relic's authenticity, such as Vatican archivist Msgr Giulio Ricci, contend that both cloths covered the same man.

=== Image of Edessa ===
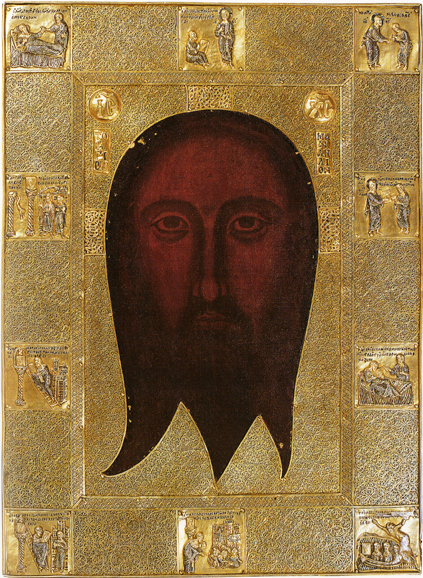
The Holy Face of Genoa

The Image of Edessa is also known as the Mandylion. Two images are claimed to be the Mandylion: the Holy Face of Genoa at the Church of St. Bartholomew of The Armenians in Genoa and the Holy Face of San Silvestro, curated in the Church of San Silvestro in Capite in Rome until 1870, and now in the Matilda Chapel of the Vatican Palace. That the Mandylion is in fact the Shroud of Turin is the subject of debate.

=== Veil of Veronica ===
The Veil of Veronica, used to wipe the sweat from Jesus' brow as he carried the cross, is claimed to bear the likeness of the face of Christ. Today, several relics are claimed to be the Veil of Veronica, with several age-old copies also being venerated.

==== Rome ====
An image kept in Saint Peter's Basilica in Rome since the 14th century is purported to be the Veil of Veronica revered in the Middle Ages. The most detailed recorded inspection in the 20th century occurred in 1907 when Jesuit art historian Joseph Wilpert inspected the image.

The Hofburg Palace in Vienna has a copy of the Veil of Veronica, identified by the 1617 AD signature of the secretary of Pope Paul V, during whose reign a series of six copies of the veil were made.

==== Alicante ====
The image at the Monastery of the Holy Face in Alicante, Spain was acquired by Pope Nicholas V from relatives of the Byzantine Emperor in 1453 and placed in Alicante in 1489.

==== Siena ====
The Jaén Cathedral in Spain has a copy of the Veronica which probably dates from 14th century Siena, known as the Santo Rostro and acquired by Bishop Nicholas de Biedma.

==== Manoppello ====
In 1999, Father Heinnrich Pfeiffer announced at a press conference in Rome that he had found the Veil in the Capuchin monastery in the village of Manoppello, Italy, where it had been since 1660. This Veil is discussed in Paul Badde's 2010 book The Face of God. Characteristics evidenced during 3D processing of the Manoppello Image have been reported.

==== Gallery ====
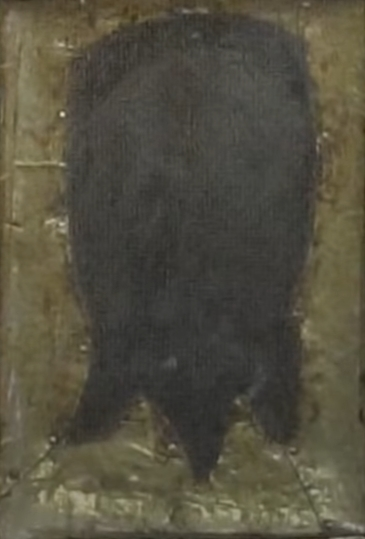
The Vatican Veil of Veronica

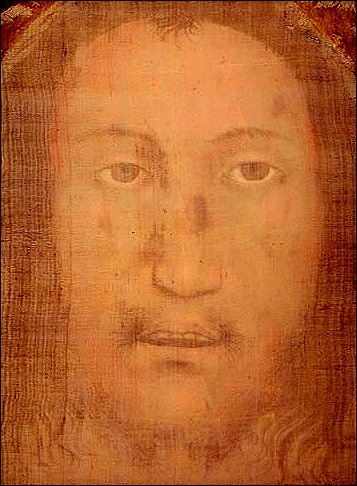
The Manoppello Image

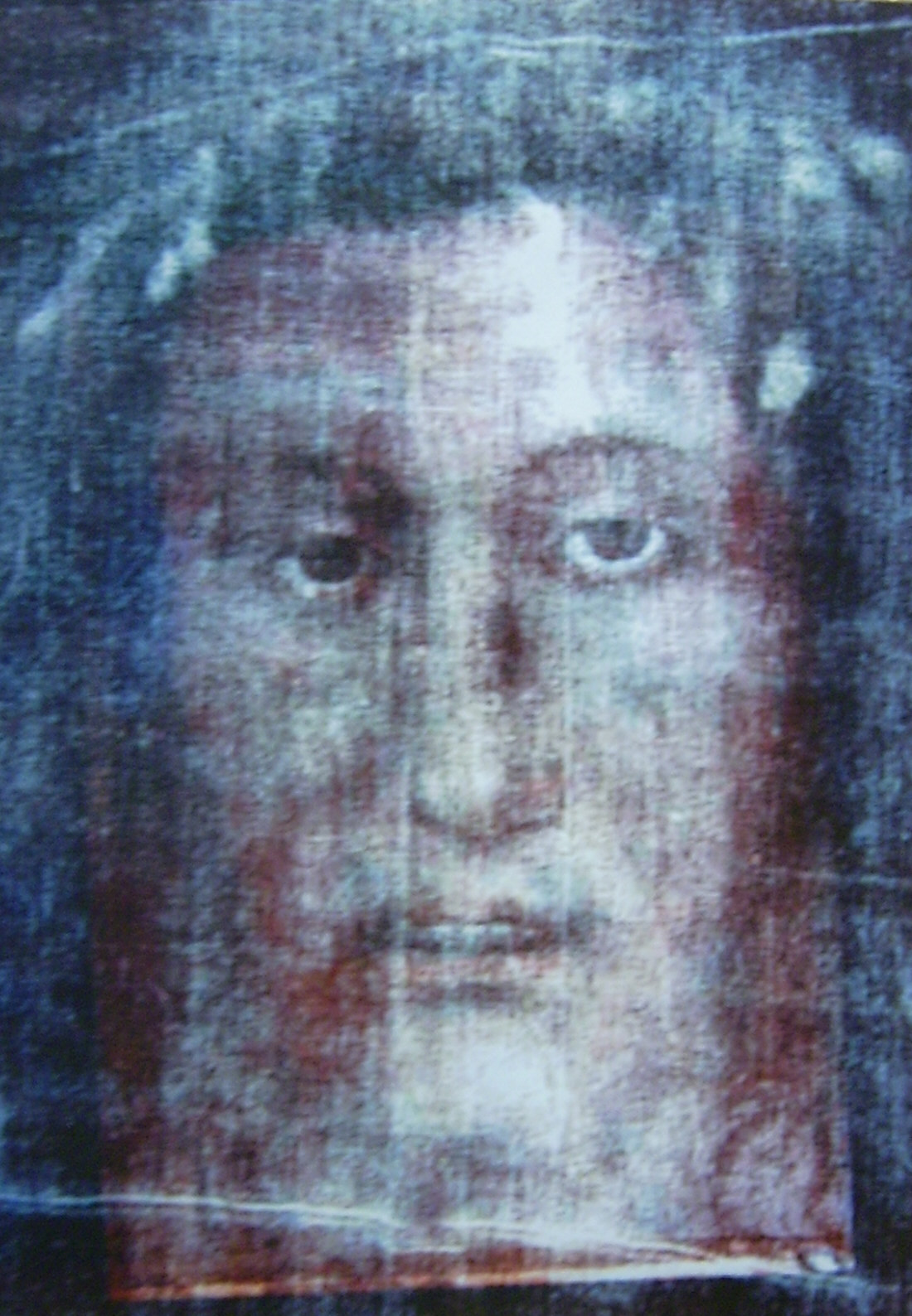
Superposition of the Veil of Manoppello on the negative of the Shroud of Turin

== Other relics ==
=== Nativity and childhood ===
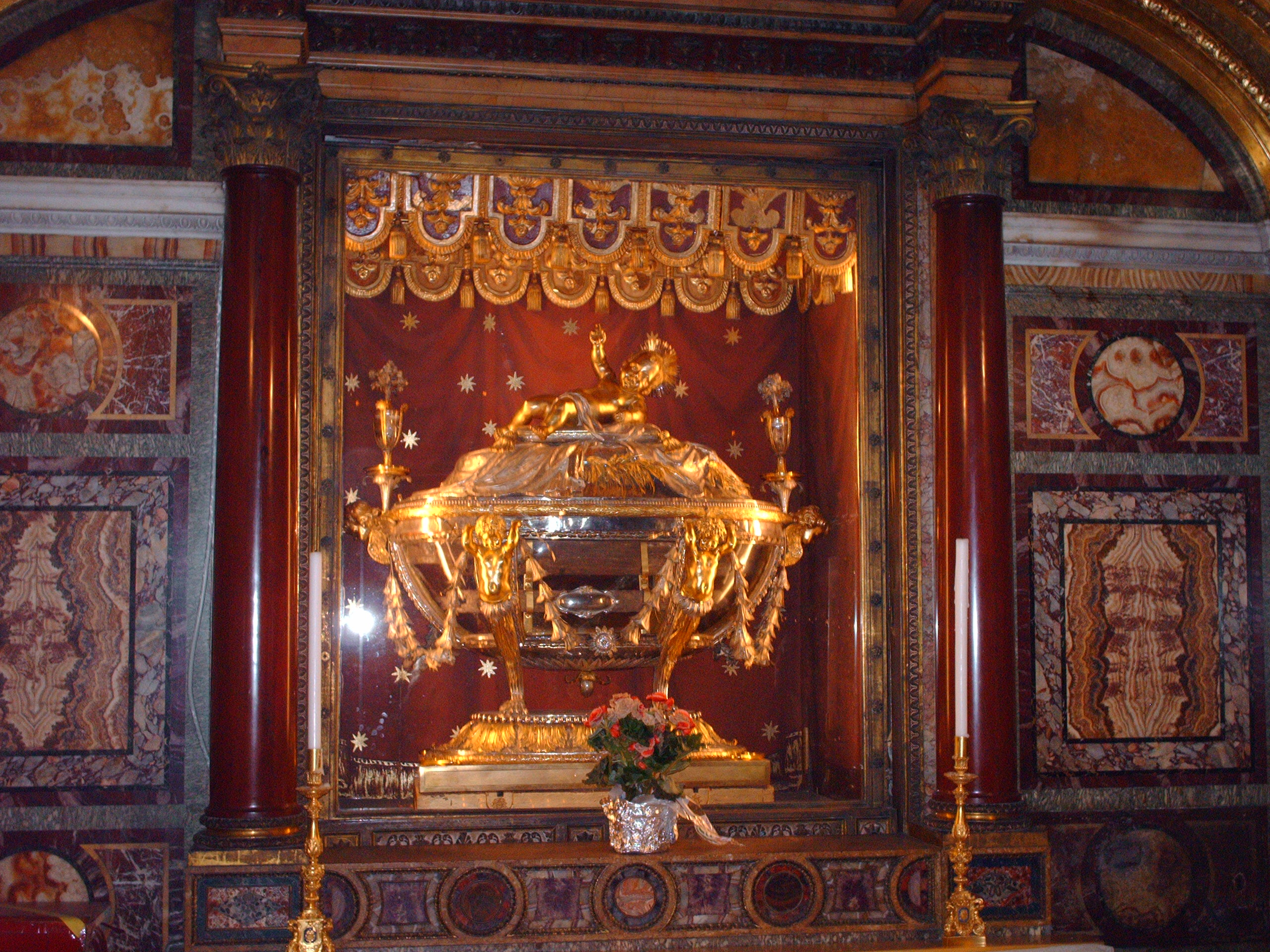
Reliquary of the Holy Crib

Wooden pieces claimed to be remnants of the manger of the baby Jesus reside in the Holy Crib reliquary at the Basilica of Santa Maria Maggiore in Rome. The relic consists of five narrow pieces of sycamore wood, which tradition holds to have been brought from the Holy Land either by Empress Helena (see 326–328 pilgrimage), or in the time of Pope Theodore I (642–649). In 2019, a fragment of the crib was removed from the Holy Crib reliquary and placed on permanent display at the Church of Saint Catherine in Bethlehem.

St. Paul's Monastery on Mount Athos claims to have relics of the Gifts of the Magi, while in Croatia, Dubrovnik's cathedral claims to have the swaddling clothes the baby Jesus wore during the presentation at the Temple.

=== The Last Supper ===
==== Last Supper knife ====
The knife used by Jesus during the Last Supper was also a matter of veneration in the Middle Ages, according to the 12th-century Guide for Pilgrims to Santiago de Compostela. According to French traveler Jules-Léonard Belin the knife used by Jesus to slice bread was permanently exhibited in the Logetta of St Mark's Campanile in Venice.

==== Holy Chalice (Holy Grail) ====
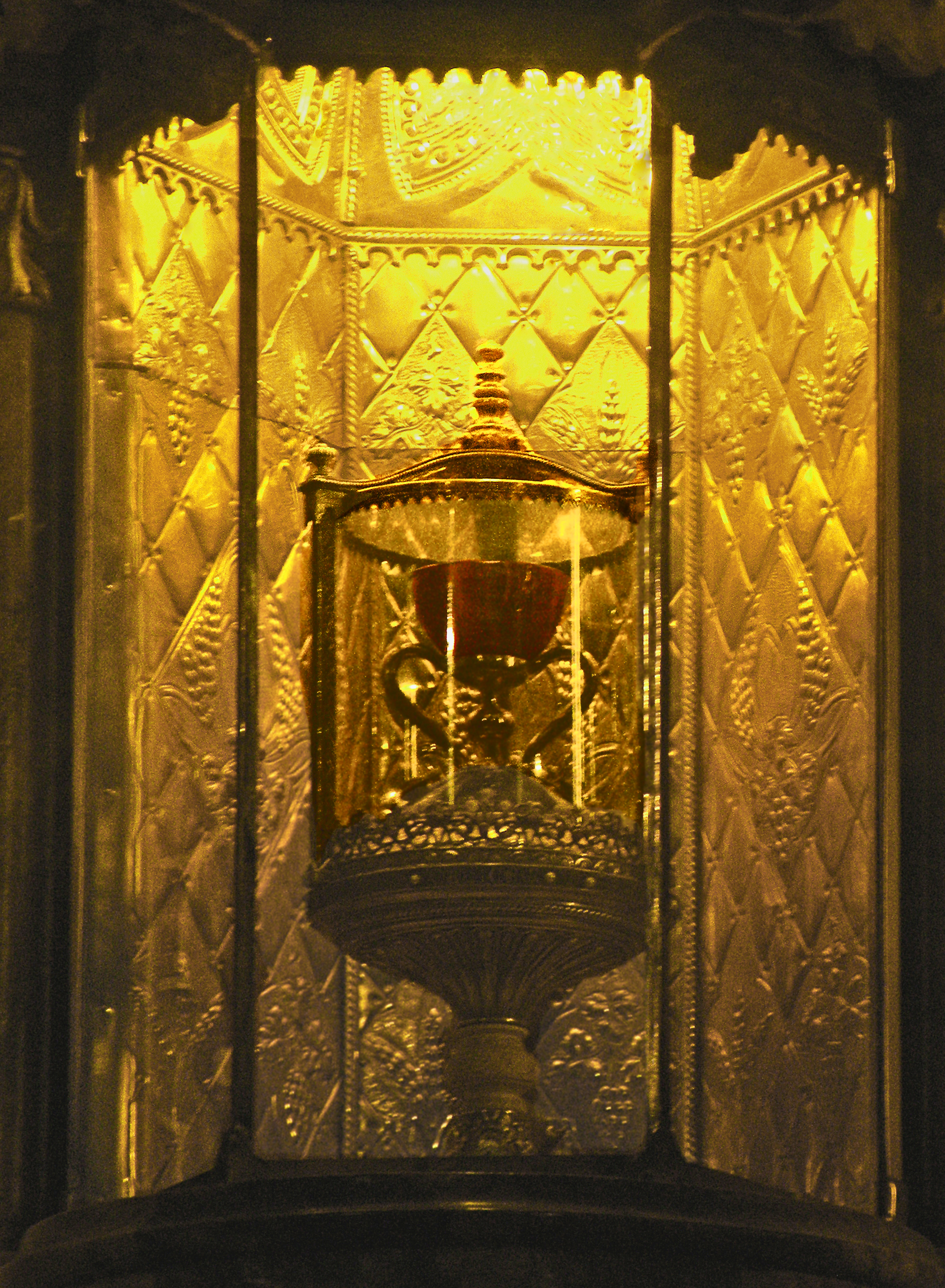
Chalice of Valencia

The Holy Chalice is the container Jesus used at the Last Supper to serve wine (Matthew 26:27–28).

Several Holy Chalice relics are reported in the legend of the Holy Grail, though not part of Catholic tradition. Of the existing chalices, only the Santo Cáliz de Valencia (Holy Chalice of the Cathedral of Valencia) is recognized as a "historical relic" by the Vatican, although not as the actual chalice used at the Last Supper. Though not claiming the relic's authenticity, both Pope John Paul II and Pope Benedict XVI have venerated this chalice at the Cathedral of Valencia.

=== Crown of Thorns ===
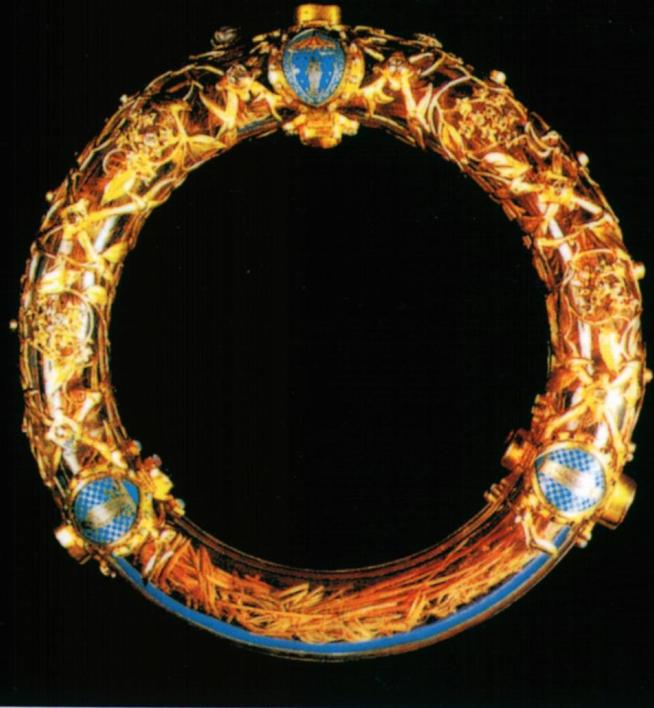
Relic of the crown of thorns, received by French King Louis IX from emperor Baldwin II. It was preserved at Notre-Dame de Paris until April 2019, when it was moved to the Louvre following a fire.

The relics of the Passion presented at Notre-Dame Cathedral in Paris include a piece of the True Cross from Rome as delivered by Helena, along with a Holy Nail and the Crown of Thorns. The Gospel of John tells that, in the night between Maundy Thursday and Good Friday, Roman soldiers mocked Jesus by placing a thorny crown on his head (John 19:12). The crown is a circle of cane bundled together and held by gold threads. The thorns were attached to this braided circle, which measured 21 cm (8.3 in) in diameter. The seventy thorns were reportedly divided up between the Byzantine emperors and the Kings of France.

The accounts of pilgrims to Jerusalem report the Crown of Thorns. In 409, Paulinus of Nola states the Crown was kept in the basilica on Mount Zion in Jerusalem. In 570, Anthony the Martyr reports the Crown of Thorns in the Basilica of Zion. Around 575, Cassiodorus wrote, "Jerusalem has the Column, here, there is the Crown of Thorns!" Between the 7th and the 10th centuries, the Crown of Thorns was moved to the Byzantine emperors' chapel in Constantinople for safekeeping. In 1238, the Latin Emperor Baldwin II of Constantinople pawned the relics for credit to a Venetian bank.

Louis IX, the king of France redeemed the Crown from the Venetian Bank. On 10 August 1239, the king deposited 29 relics in Villeneuve-l'Archevêque. On 19 August 1239, the relics arrived in Paris. Wearing a simple tunic and with bare feet, the King placed the Crown of Thorns and other relics in the palace chapel in a structure he commissioned. During the French revolution, the relics were stored in the National Library. After the Concordat in 1801, the relics were given to the archbishop of Paris who placed them in the Cathedral treasury on 10 August 1806. Since then, these relics have been conserved by the canons of the Metropolitan Basilica Chapter, who are in charge of venerations, and guarded by the Knights of the Order of the Holy Sepulchre of Jerusalem. Napoleon I and Napoleon III each offered reliquaries for the crown of thorns. They were on display at Notre-Dame Cathedral during scheduled religious ceremonies, until a serious fire struck the cathedral on 15 April 2019.

=== Crucifixion ===
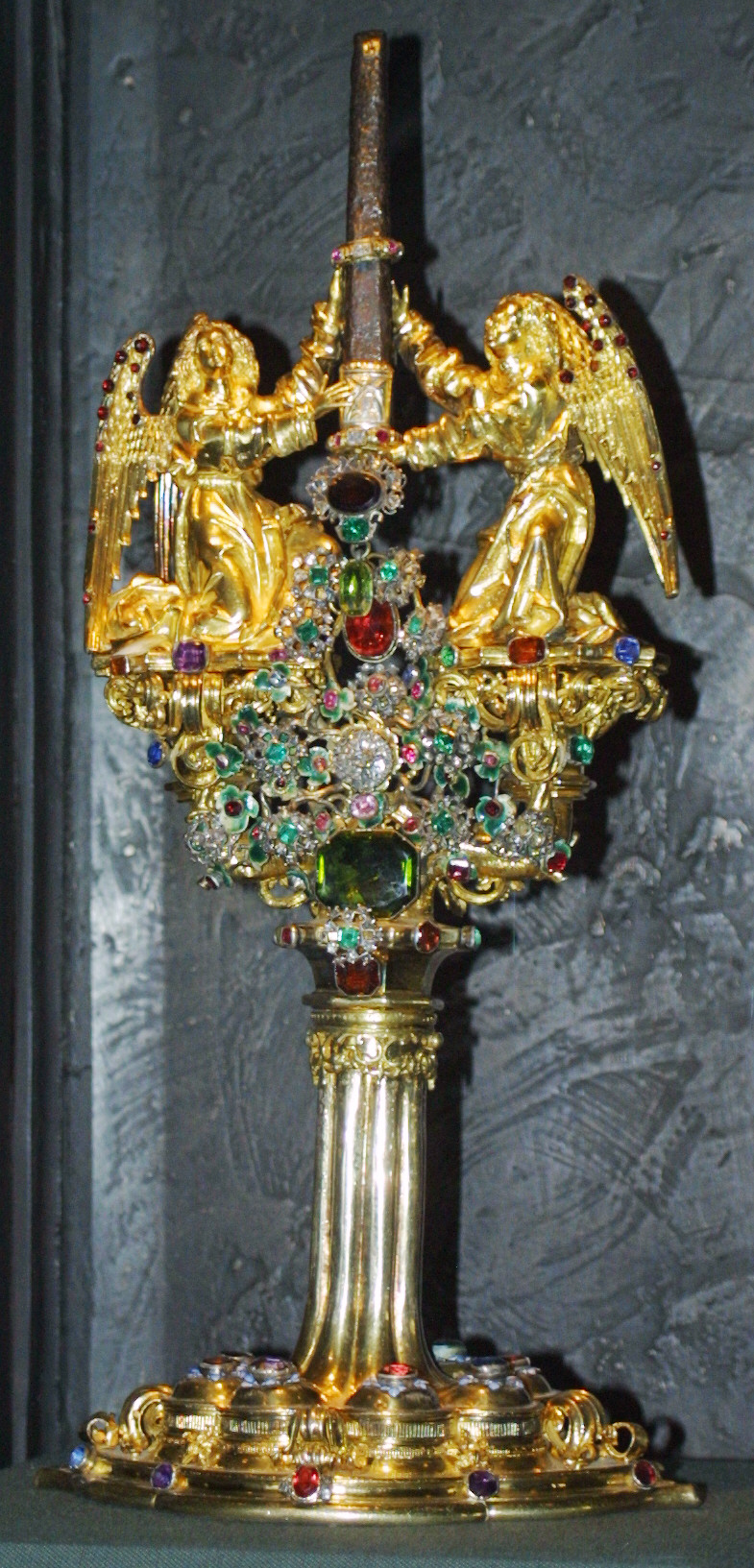
Relic with a holy nail at the Bamberg Cathedral

Many relics currently displayed result from the journey of Helena, the mother of Constantine the Great, to Syria Palaestina in the 4th century. The authenticity of many of these relics is questioned. For instance, the Holy Nails brought back by Helena, some believe the Catholic Encyclopedia notes are problematic based on the number of claimed relics:

Very little reliance can be placed upon the authenticity of the thirty or more holy nails which are still venerated, or which have been venerated until recent times, in such treasuries as that of Santa Croce in Rome, or those of Venice, Aachen, Escurial, Nuremberg, Prague, etc. Probably the majority began by professing to be facsimiles which had touched or contained filings from some other nail whose claim was more ancient.

The Scala Sancta, the stairs from Pontius Pilate's praetorium, ascended by Jesus during his trial, were brought to Rome by Helena of Constantinople in the 4th century according to tradition.

The Basilica of the Holy Blood in Bruges, Belgium, claims a specimen of Christ's blood on a cloth in a phial, given by Thierry of Alsace after the 12th century.

Other claimed relics, based on the Crucifixion of Christ include:

- The Holy Coat: The possession of the seamless garment of Christ (Latin: tunica inconsultilis; John 19:23), for which the soldiers cast lots at the Crucifixion, is claimed by the cathedral of Trier, Germany, and by the parish church of Argenteuil, France. The Argenteuil church claims that their Holy Coat was brought by Charlemagne.
- The crucifixion site called Golgotha, is in the Church of the Holy Sepulchre in Jerusalem. Inside the church the crucifixion site consists of a pile of rock about 7 metres (23 ft) long by 3 metres (9.8 ft) wide by 4.8 metres (16 ft).
- The Iron Crown of Lombardy and Bridle of Constantine are reported to be made from the Holy Nails.
- The Holy Lance is the spear used by the Roman soldier Longinus to pierce Jesus' side when he was on the cross.
- The Holy Sponge is claimed by numerous holders, including the church Santa Croce in Gerusalemme in Rome.
- The Column of the Flagellation, which Jesus was tied to during the Flagellation of Christ, is reportedly in the Basilica of Saint Praxedes in Rome.

=== Bodily relics ===
Christian teaching states that Christ ascended into heaven corporeally. Therefore, the only parts of his body available for veneration are those obtained prior to the Ascension. At various points in history, a number of churches in Europe have claimed to possess the Holy Prepuce, Jesus' foreskin from his Circumcision; tears shed by Christ when mourning Lazarus; the blood of Christ shed during the crucifixion; a milk tooth that fell out of the mouth of Jesus at the age of 9; beard hair, head hair, Christ's nails.

== See also ==
- List of artifacts significant to the Bible
- Life of Jesus in the New Testament
- Titulus Crucis

== General sources ==
- Cruz, Joan Carroll (October 1984), Relics, Our Sunday Visitor Publishing, ISBN 978-0-87973-701-6
- Cruz, Joan Carroll (May 2003), Saintly Men of Modern Times, Our Sunday Visitor Publishing, ISBN 978-1-931709-77-4
- Dillenberger, John (1999), Images and relics: theological perceptions and visual images in sixteenth-century Europe, Oxford University Press US, ISBN 978-0-19-512172-8
- Griffin, Justin (July 2001), The Holy Grail: the legend, the history, the evidence, McFarland, ISBN 978-0-7864-0999-0
- Houlden, James Leslie (2003), Jesus in History, Thought, and Culture, Santa Barbara: ABC-Clio Inc, ISBN 978-1-57607-856-3
- Nickell, Joe (2007), Relics of the Christ, Lexington: University Press of Kentucky, ISBN 978-0-8131-2425-4
- Ruffin, Bernard (1999), The Shroud of Turin: the most up-to-date analysis of all the facts regarding the Church's controversial relic, Huntington: Our Sunday Visitor, ISBN 978-0-87973-617-0
- Wilson, Ian (1991), Holy Faces, Secret Places, London: Doubleday, ISBN 978-0-385-26105-0
