= Holy Sponge =

Instrument of the Passion of Jesus Christ

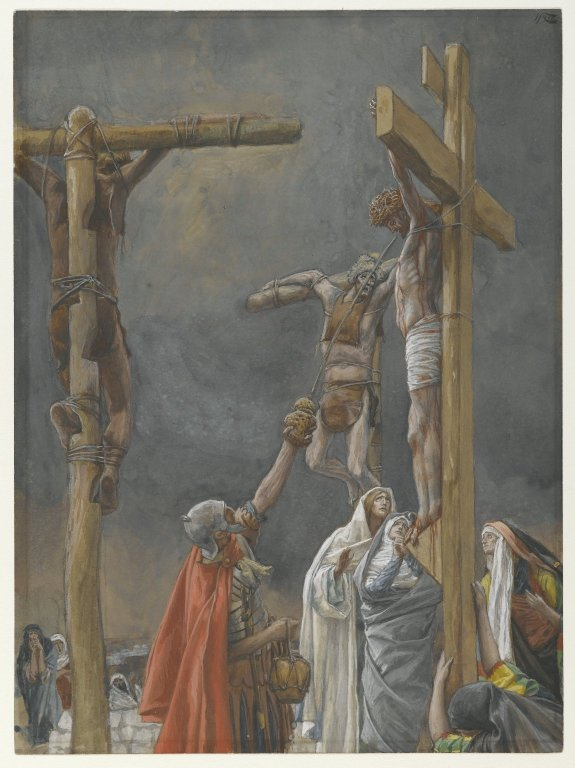
James Tissot's depiction. Here, the hyssop stick is used as a kind of straw, and "Stephaton" squeezes the sponge. (c. 1880, gouache over graphite on grey wove paper)

The Holy Sponge is one of the Instruments of the Passion of Jesus. It was dipped in vinegar (Ancient Greek: ὄξος, romanized: oxos; in some translations sour wine), most likely posca, a regular beverage of Roman soldiers, and offered to Jesus to drink from during the Crucifixion, according to Matthew 27:48, Mark 15:36, and John 19:29.

== History ==
=== Jerusalem ===
An object thought to be the Holy Sponge was venerated in the Holy Land, in the Upper Room of the Constantinian basilica, where Sophronius of Jerusalem spoke of it c. 600 AD:

And let me go rejoicing
to the splendid sanctuary, the place
where the noble Empress Helena
found the divine Wood;

and go up,
my heart overcome with awe,
and see the Upper Room,
the Reed, the Sponge, and the Lance.

Then may I gaze down
upon the fresh beauty of the Basilica
where choirs of monks
sing nightly songs of worship.

— Sophronius

=== Rome ===
In the Basilica di San Giovanni in Laterano in Rome, a brown sponge is venerated. Other pieces of sponge are present at the following:

- the Basilica di Santa Maria Maggiore
- the Basilica di Santa Maria in Trastevere
- St. Mary in Campitelli

The Chapel of the Relics at Santa Croce in Gerusalemme houses another piece of sponge:

Of all the churches in Rome, Santa Croce has one of the richest collections of relics. A special chapel was therefore built for them in 1930. A staircase to the left of the choir leads to this chapel, where one can see three pieces of the True Cross, one of its nails, a fragment of the INRI ("Jesus of Nazareth, King of the Jews") inscription, two thorns from Christ's crown of thorns, a piece of the sponge that was held up to him, one of the silver pieces paid to Judas, St Thomas's finger which touched the wounds of Christ, and the crossbar from the Good Thief's cross. The paving stones are said to have been laid on a substantial amount of earth from Golgotha.

=== Constantinople and France ===
In the 7th century, Nicetas took part in the conquest of Egypt from Phocas. He was famed for bringing items he claimed were the Holy Sponge and the Holy Lance (the "Lance of Longinus") to Constantinople from Palestine in 612. From 619 to 628/9 he may anecdotally have been exarch of Africa.

This sponge remained in Constantinople until it was bought from the Latin emperor Baldwin II by Louis IX of France among the relics he needed for the Sainte-Chapelle in Paris. Participants in the French Revolution dispersed these relics (including the Crown of Thorns and a bit of the True Cross). Some went briefly to the Bibliothèque Nationale. Later, however, they were restored to Notre-Dame de Paris.

=== Other claimants ===
Other parties also claiming access to the Holy Sponge include:

- the church of St. Jacques de Compiègne in France
- Aachen's cathedral (Charlemagne's sample)

== See also ==
- Relics associated with Jesus
  - Arma Christi
  - Crown of thorns
  - Holy Chalice
  - Lance of Longinus
  - Titulus Crucis
  - True Cross
