= Titulus Crucis =

Relic venerated as a piece of the cross on which Jesus was crucified

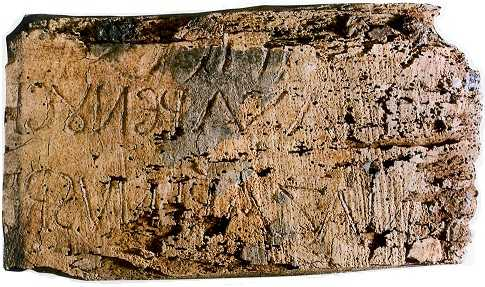
Titulus Crucis

The Titulus Crucis (Latin for "Title of the Cross") is a relic kept in the Church of Santa Croce in Gerusalemme in Rome which is claimed to be the titulus (title panel, also known as the "superscription") of the True Cross on which Jesus Christ was crucified. The relic's authenticity is disputed, with some scholars claiming a semiplausible authenticity, while a majority dispute or consider it to be a medieval forgery. Three separate radiocarbon dating tests on the artifact have shown that it dates between 980 and 1146 AD.

The board is made of walnut wood, 25 cm × 14 cm × 2.6 cm (9.8 in × 5.5 in × 1.0 in) and has a weight of 687 grams (1.515 lb). It is inscribed on one side with three lines, of which the first is mostly destroyed. The second line is written in Greek letters and reversed script, the third in Latin letters, also with reversed script. The Latin reads Iesus Nazarenus Rex Iudaeorum ("Jesus the Nazarene King of the Jews"), corresponding to John 19:19 and the initials INRI. The Titulus Crucis is also mentioned in the Synoptics: in Mark 15:26 (as the reason of the crucifixion), in Luke 23:38 and in Matthew 27:37.

== Helena's relic ==
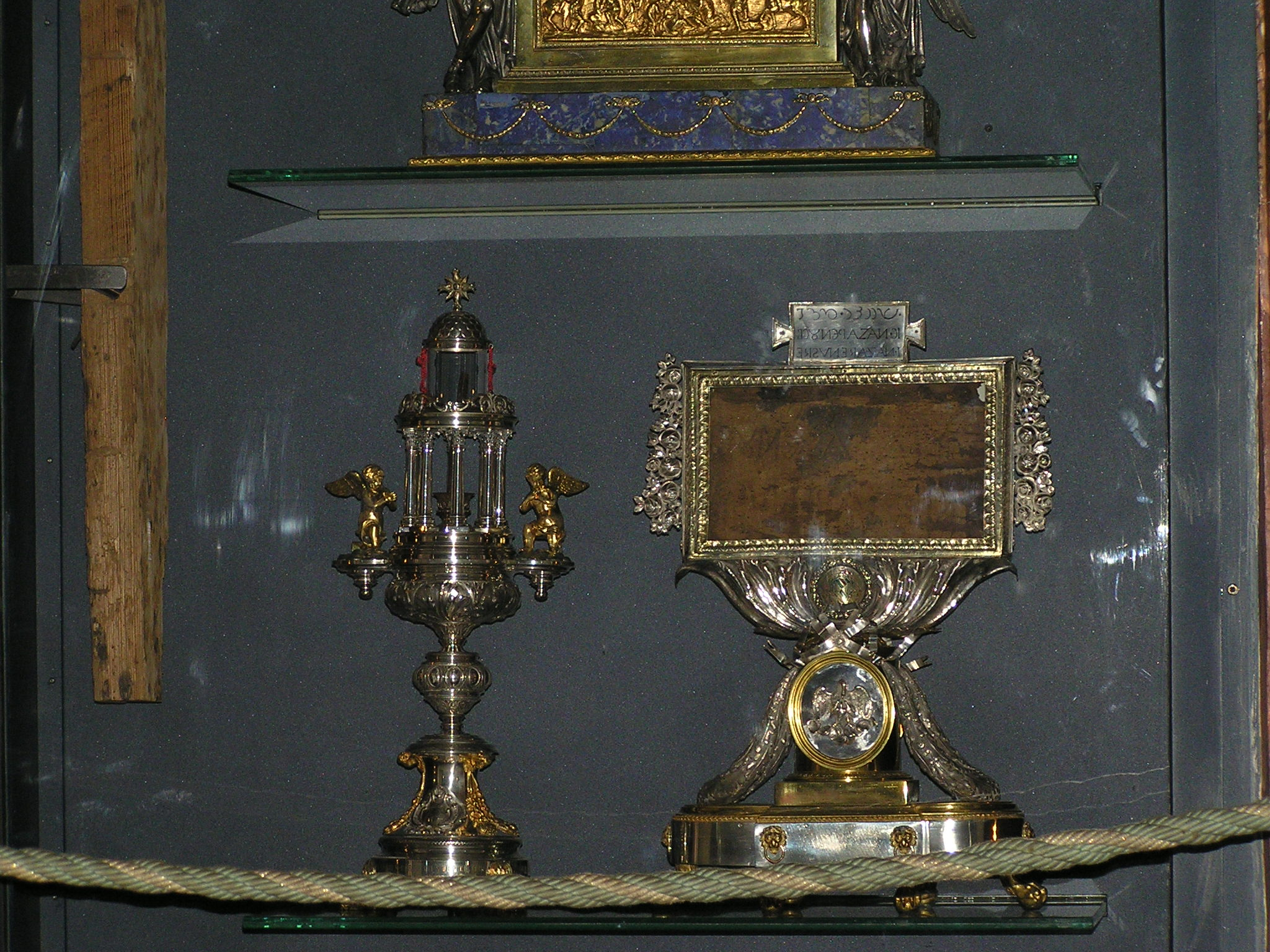
A part of this sign, relic known as the "Title" or "Titulus Crucis", kept in the Cappella delle Reliquie in Rome, Italy.

Saint Helena, Roman Empress and mother of Emperor Constantine the Great, went on pilgrimage to the Holy Land and reportedly discovered the True Cross and many other relics which were donated to the church of Santa Croce in Gerusalemme ("Holy Cross in Jerusalem") which she had built in Rome about AD 325. Gherardo Caccianemici dal Orso was made cardinal priest of the church in 1124 and, some time before he became Pope Lucius II in 1144, he renovated the church and had the relic deposited in a box that bears his seal as a cardinal. The box was apparently forgotten until 1 February 1492, when workers restoring a mosaic discovered it hidden behind a brick that was inscribed "Titulus Crucis". Pedro González de Mendoza, Spanish cardinal priest of Santa Croce at the time, encouraged veneration of the rediscovered relic.

== Other Jerusalem relics ==
Some Christian pilgrims who visited Jerusalem in the centuries between Helena and Pope Lucius reported seeing Christ's titulus there: Egeria reported that in AD 383 "A silver-gilt casket is brought in which is the holy wood of the Cross. The casket is opened and (the wood) is taken out, and both the wood of the Cross and the title are placed upon the table." (Note: Latin original: "et affertur loculus argenteus deauratus, in quo est lignum sanctum crucis, aperitur et profertur, ponitur in mensa tam lignum crucis quam titulus.") Antoninus of Piacenza in the 6th century described a titulus of "nut" wood with the inscription "Hic est rex Iudaeorum" ("Here is the king of the Jews"), corresponding to Luke 23:38.

== Authenticity ==
In 1997, the German author and historian Michael Hesemann investigated the relic. Hesemann presented the inscription of the title to seven experts on Hebrew, Greek and Latin palaeography: Gabriel Barkay of the Israel Antiquities Authority; Hanan Eshel, Ester Eshel and Leah Di Segni of the Hebrew University of Jerusalem; Israel Roll and Benjamin Isaac of the University of Tel Aviv and Carsten Peter Thiede of the Ben-Gurion University of the Negev. According to Hesemann, none of the consulted experts found any indication of medieval or late antique forged writing. They all dated the scripts to a timeframe between the 1st and the 3rd–4th centuries AD, with a majority of experts preferring—and none of them excluding—the 1st century. Hesemann concluded that it is very well possible that the writing on the Titulus Crucis is indeed authentic. Carsten Peter Thiede suggested that the Titulus Crucis is likely to be identical to a genuine part of the True Cross, written by a Jewish scribe. He said that the order of the languages matches what is historically plausible, as it differs from the order found in the canonical New Testament. He surmises that if the relic were counterfeit, the forger would have directly copied the biblical text. Joe Nickell refers to this argument as "trying to psychoanalyze the dead," saying that "Forgers—particularly of another era—may do something cleverer or dumber or simply different from what we would expect."

In 2002, the Roma Tre University conducted radiocarbon dating tests on the artifact, and it was shown to have been made between 980 and 1146 AD. (Note: The uncalibrated radio-carbon date was 1020 ± 30 BP, calibrated as AD 996–1023 (1σ) and AD 980–1146 (2σ), using the method of calibration of radiocarbon dates INTCAL98. These results were published in the peer-reviewed journal Radiocarbon.) The Titulus Crucis recovered from the residence of Helena is therefore considered a medieval artifact; while the Italian classicist Maria Rigato discussed the possibility that it is a copy of a now-lost original.

Antonio Lombatti claims that the Titulus Crucis is an evident, and poorly executed medieval forgery. He also critiqued academics for ignoring fringe theories associated with various religious relics as it would allow false and pseudoscientific claims to spread. Lombatti highlighted its lack of provenance showing a 1,100 year gap, no early witnesses alongside silence from historians like Eusebius, and the contradictory timelines. Other issues he noted were the grammatical errors, Byzantine period anachronisms, the Latin and Greek texts being written backwards, and the definitive Carbon 14 dating.

== See also ==
- Relics associated with Jesus
