= Holy Prepuce =

Purported product of the circumcision of Jesus

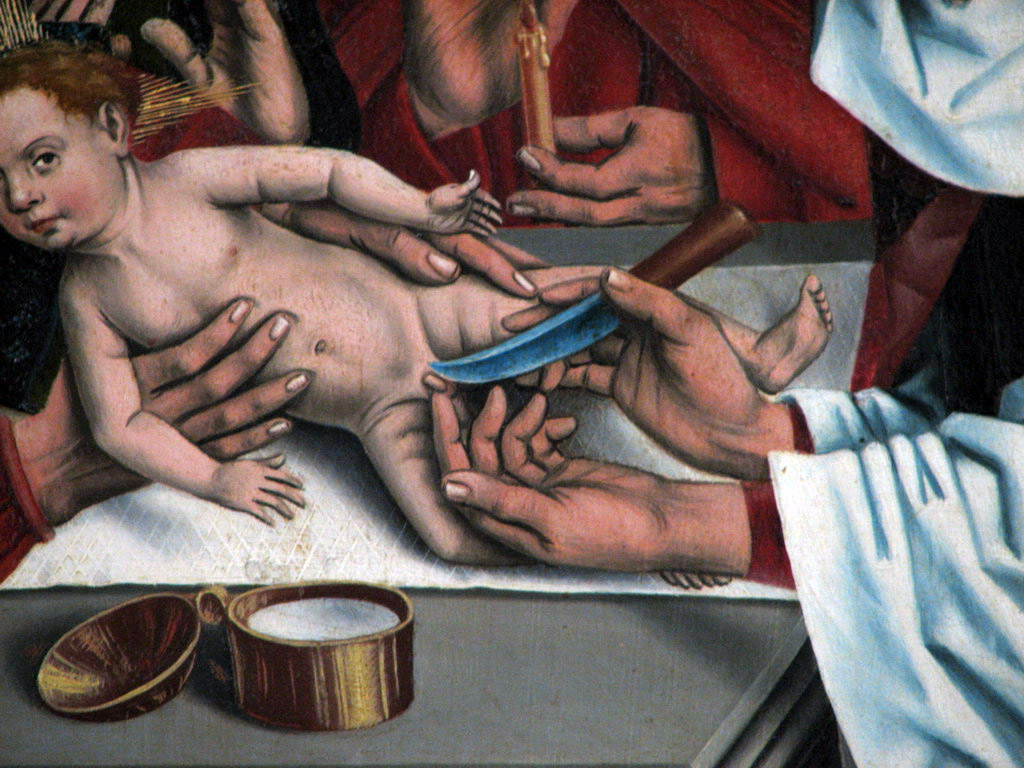
Circumcision of Christ (detail), by Friedrich Herlin

The Holy Prepuce, or Holy Foreskin (Latin præputium or prepucium), is one of several relics attributed to Jesus, consisting of the foreskin removed during the circumcision of Jesus. At various points in history, as many as 31 churches in Europe have claimed to possess the Prepuce, sometimes at the same time. Various miraculous powers have been ascribed to it, such as claims the relic has the power of duplication.

== History and rival claims ==
=== Background ===
All Jewish boys are required by Jewish religious law to be circumcised on the eighth day following their birth; the Feast of the Circumcision of Christ, still celebrated by many churches around the world, accordingly falls on January 1. Luke 2:21 (King James Version), reads: "And when eight days were accomplished for the circumcising of the child, his name was called JESUS, which was so named of the angel before he was conceived in the womb." The first reference to the survival of Christ's severed foreskin comes in the second chapter of the apocryphal Arabic Infancy Gospel which contains the following story:

And when the time of his circumcision was come, namely, the eighth day, on which the law commanded the child to be circumcised, they circumcised him in a cave.

And the old Hebrew woman took the foreskin (others say she took the navel-string), and preserved it in an alabaster-box of old oil of spikenard.

And she had a son who was a druggist, to whom she said, "Take heed thou sell not this alabaster box of spikenard-ointment, although thou shouldst be offered three hundred pence for it."

Now this is that alabaster-box which Mary the sinner procured, and poured forth the ointment out of it upon the head and feet of our Lord Jesus Christ, and wiped it off with the hairs of her head.

=== Early relics ===
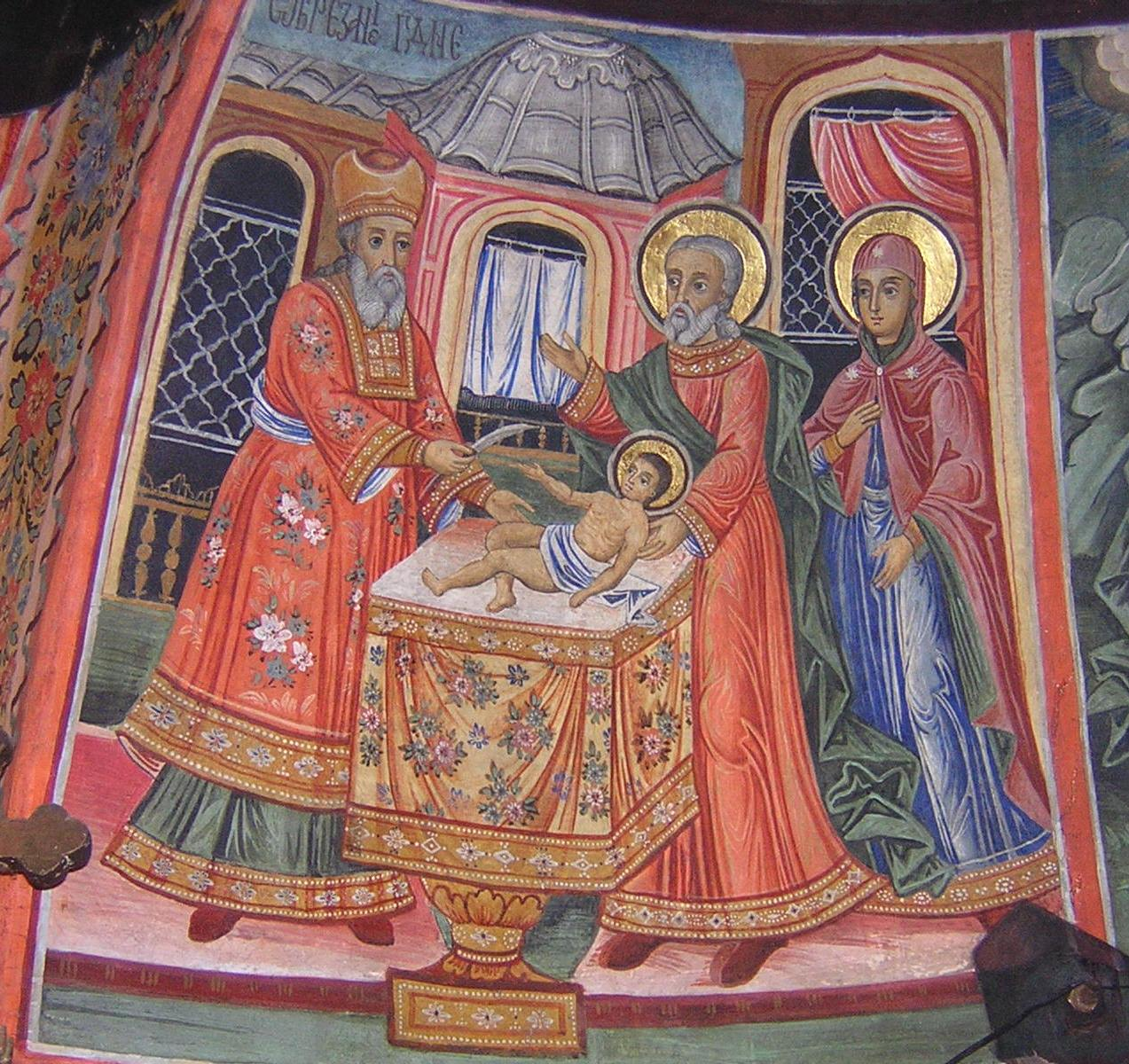
Circumcision of Christ, fresco from the Preobrazhenski Monastery, Bulgaria

Foreskin relics began appearing in Europe during the Middle Ages. The earliest recorded sighting came on December 25, 800, when Charlemagne gave it to Pope Leo III when being crowned Emperor. Charlemagne claimed that it had been brought to him by an angel while he prayed at the Holy Sepulchre, although a more prosaic report says it was a wedding gift from the Byzantine Empress Irene. Its authenticity was later considered to be confirmed by a vision of Saint Bridget of Sweden, who confirmed that it was somewhere in Rome. The Descriptio Lateranensis Ecclesiae, written shortly before 1100, indicated that a cypress chest commissioned by Leo III and placed under the altar in the Chapel of St. Lawrence held three caskets. One of the caskets contained a gold jeweled cross. The document stated that in this cross was the foreskin and umbilicus of Jesus.

However, in 1905 Pope Pius X authorized an inventory compiled by Professor Hartmann Grisar, of the University of Innsbruck. Grisar's report corresponds to the earlier Descriptio Lateranensis Ecclesiae. The gold cross was dated to between the sixth and eighth centuries. Grisar's study stated that, like Pope Paschal's enameled silver reliquary cross, the gold jeweled cross was clearly initially designed to hold a relic of the True Cross. This is further supported by the statement in the Descriptio relating it to a procession on the feast of the Exaltation of the Holy Cross. The Vita of Pope Sergius I (687-701) mentions both the Feast of the Exaltation, the jeweled cross, and veneration of the relic contained therein. Grisar attributed the reference to the foreskin and umbilicus as derived from later Medieval traditions. The gold cross was lost in 1945.

== Medieval traffic in relics ==
Mary Dzon says that for many people during the Medieval period, devotion to the Holy Prepuce reflected a focus on the humanity of Jesus.

According to Farley, "Depending on what you read, there were eight, twelve, fourteen, or even 18 different holy foreskins in various European towns during the Middle Ages." In addition to the Holy Foreskin of Rome (later Calcata), other claimants included the Cathedral of Le Puy-en-Velay, Santiago de Compostela, the city of Antwerp, Coulombs in the diocese of Chartres, as well as Chartres itself, and churches in Besançon, Metz, Hildesheim, Charroux, Conques, Langres, Fécamp, and two in Auvergne.

One of the most famous prepuces arrived in Antwerp in Brabant in 1100 as a gift from King Baldwin I of Jerusalem, who purchased it in the Holy Land during the First Crusade. This prepuce became famous when the bishop of Cambrai, during the celebration of the Mass, saw three drops of blood blotting the linens of the altar. A special chapel was constructed and processions organised in honour of the miraculous relic, which became the goal of pilgrimages. In 1426, a brotherhood was founded in the cathedral "van der heiliger Besnidenissen ons liefs Heeren Jhesu Cristi in onser liever Vrouwen Kercke t' Antwerpen" ("of the Holy Circumcision of our beloved Lord Jesus Christ in our Beloved Lady's Church in Antwerp"). Its 24 members were all abbots and prominent laymen. The relic disappeared in 1566, but the chapel still exists, decorated by two stained glass windows donated by king Henry VII of England and his wife Elizabeth of York in 1503.

The abbey of Charroux claimed the Holy Foreskin was presented to the monks by Charlemagne. In the early 13th century it was taken in procession to Rome where it was presented before Pope Innocent III, who was asked to rule on its authenticity. The Pope declined the opportunity. At some point, however, the relic went missing, and remained lost until 1856 when a workman repairing the abbey claimed to have found a reliquary hidden inside a wall, containing the missing foreskin. This was not the only test of the relic's legitimacy. Anthropologist Eric Silverman controversially writes: "a common test for foreskinned authenticity was taste. A physician, supervised by a priest, sampled the skin for the flavour of genuine holiness. The taster was called a croque-prepuce, or 'foreskin cruncher'", though his source may be rooted in 19th century anti-Catholic rhetoric.

=== Status in the Catholic calendar ===
According to Farley, the Second Vatican Council later removed the Day of the Holy Circumcision from the Latin church calendar, although Eastern Catholics and Traditional Roman Catholics still celebrate the Feast of the Circumcision of Our Lord on 1 January. In reality, it was more than two years before 11 October 1962, the date when the Second Vatican Council began, that a 25 July 1960 decree of Pope John XXIII enacted a wide-ranging revision of the General Roman Calendar, which included changing the name of the 1 January feast from "Circumcision of the Lord and Octave of the Nativity" to "Octave of the Nativity", with no change of the Gospel reading about the circumcision of the child Jesus.

== Modern practices ==
Most of the Holy Prepuces were lost or destroyed during the Reformation and the French Revolution.

=== Relic in Calcata, Italy ===
In the Italian village of Calcata, a reliquary containing the supposed Holy Foreskin was paraded through the streets as recently as 1983 on the Feast of the Circumcision, which was formerly marked by the Roman Catholic Church around the world on January 1 each year. The practice ended, however, when thieves stole the jewel-encrusted case, contents and all.

David Farley recounts how a relic brought to Rome by Saint Brigida and said to be the holy foreskin was looted during the sack of the city in 1527. The German soldier who stole it was captured in the village of Calcata, 47 km (29 mi) north of Rome, later the same year. Housed in Calcata, it was venerated from that time onwards, with the Church vouching for its authenticity by offering a ten-year indulgence to pilgrims. Pilgrims, nuns and monks flocked to the church, and "Calcata [became] a must-see destination on the pilgrimage map." A local priest reported the foreskin as stolen in 1983. Following this theft, it is unclear whether any of the purported Holy Prepuces still exist.

In a 1997 television documentary for Channel 4, British journalist Miles Kington travelled to Italy in search of the Holy Foreskin, but was unable to find any remaining example.

In 2009, David Farley's book An Irreverent Curiosity: In Search of the Church's Strangest Relic in Italy's Oddest Town was published on the topic of the Calcata relic. On December 22, 2013, National Geographic Channel broadcast a documentary starring Farley called "The Quest for the Holy Foreskin".

== Literary allusions ==
Thomas of Chobham, in his 1210 treatise on preaching, uses the holy foreskin within a eucharist analogy. Discussing how Christ's foreskin can be present on earth, but also at the same time exist in a resurrected form.

Agnes Blannbekin, a medieval Christian mystic, reported mystical visionary experiences with the foreskin, claiming it smelt like a sweet odour and had the taste of honey.

In the 14th-century, Catherine of Siena mentioned the foreskin-as-wedding ring motif in one of her letters (#221), equating the wedding ring of a virgin with a foreskin.

John Calvin in his Treatise on Relics in 1543, mocked the monks of Charroux who claimed that the relic was genuine because it "yields drops of blood".

In the late 17th century, the Vatican librarian Leo Allatius wrote an unpublished treatise entitled De Praeputio Domini Nostri Jesu Christi Diatriba (Discourse on the Foreskin of Our Lord Jesus Christ). According to an unconfirmed 19th-century source, its thesis is that the Holy Prepuce ascended, like Jesus himself, and was transformed into the rings of Saturn, then-recently observed by telescope.

Voltaire, in A Treatise of Toleration (1763), referred to veneration of the Holy Foreskin as being one of a number of "superstitions" that were "much more reasonable...than to detest and persecute your brother".

Umberto Eco, in his book Baudolino, has the young Baudolino invent a story about seeing the holy foreskin and navel in Rome to the company of Frederick Barbarossa.

James Joyce's Ulysses has Stephen Dedalus pondering the Holy Prepuce while he urinates with Leopold Bloom, in the section titled "Ithaca".

In The Gospel According to Jesus Christ, José Saramago writes that anyone "wishing to venerate that foreskin today need only visit the parish church of Calcata near Viterbo in Italy, where it is preserved in a reliquary for the spiritual benefit of the faithful and the amusement of prying atheists."

== See also ==
- Circumcision controversy in early Christianity
- Holy Nail
- Nanteos Cup
- Sandals of Jesus Christ
- Shroud of Turin
- Titulus Crucis
- Tree of Jesse
- True Cross
