= Eparchy of Veliko Tarnovo =

Eparchy of Veliko Tarnovo is one of the eparchies of the Bulgarian Orthodox Church in the Bulgaria.

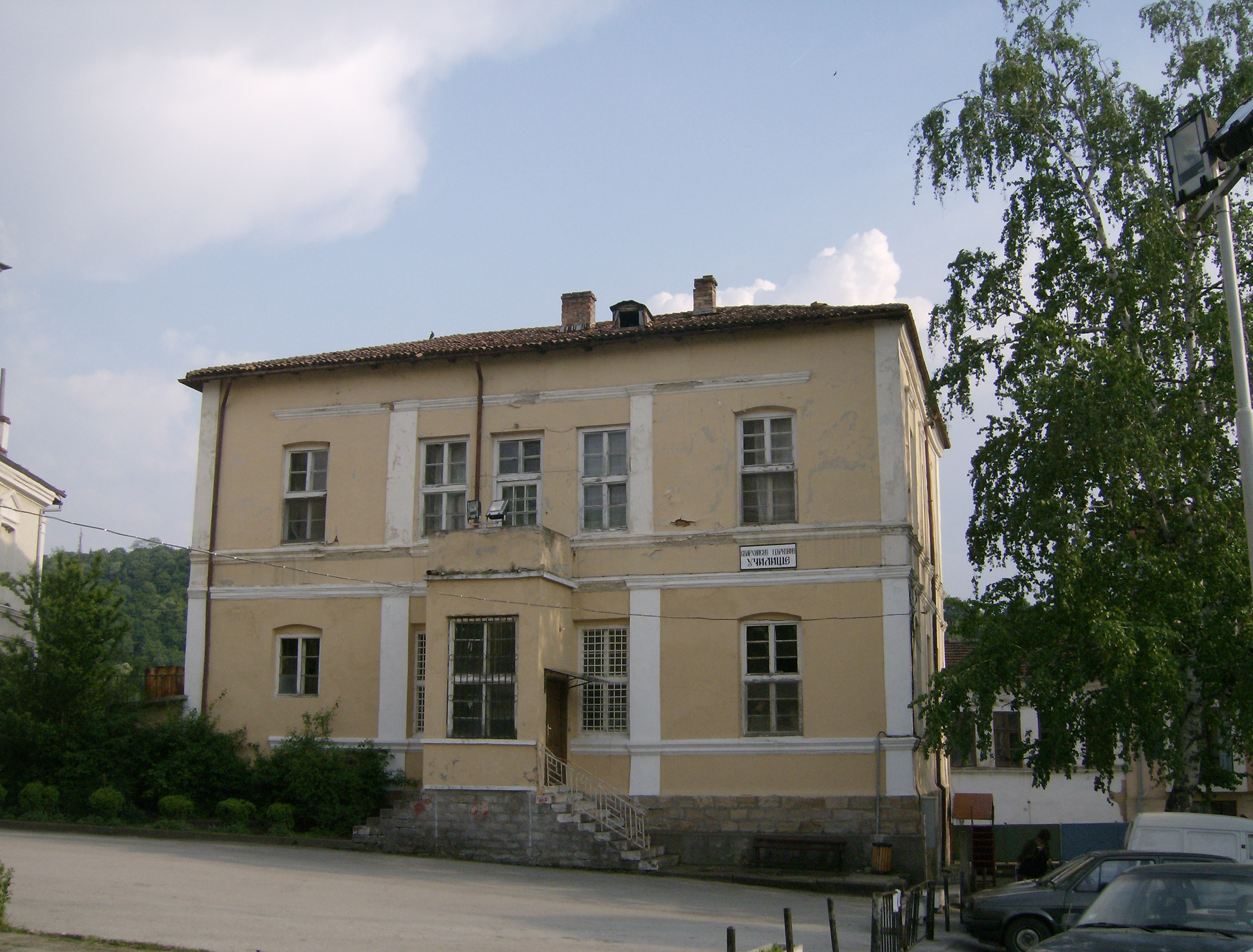

== History ==
The Eparchy was established after the conversion of the Bulgarians in the time of Saint Boris I of Bulgaria. After 1185 Tarnovo became the centre of the Tarnovo Patriarchate. When the Ottomans conquered Bulgaria Tarnovo Patriarchate decreases in Eparchy of Veliko Tarnovo. The Eparchy were subordinated Ecumenical Patriarchate of Constantinople. The first metropolitan of the Eparchy of Veliko Tarnovo after the Ottoman rule was Ilarion Makariopolski in 1872.

== Monasteries ==
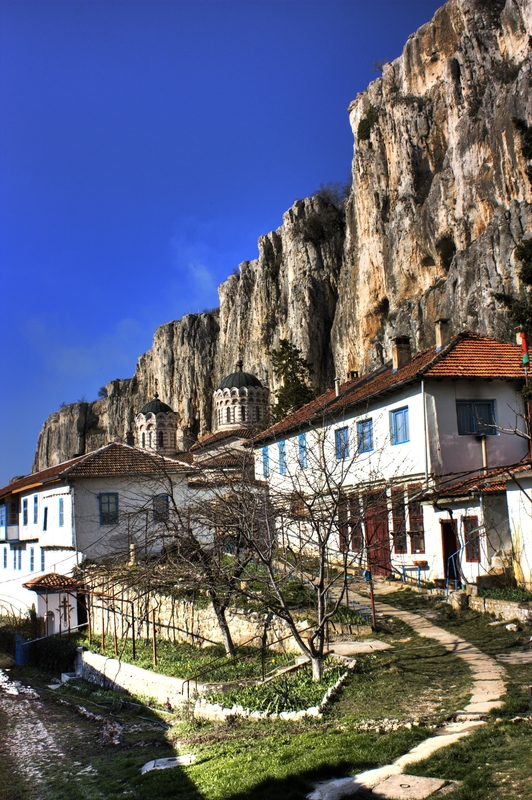
Patriarchal Monastery of the Holy Trinity

=== Veliko Tarnovo vicarage ===
- Arbanassi monastery "Assumption of Virgin. Virgin"
- Arbanassi monastery "St. Nikolay"
- Kilifarevo Monastery "Nativity of the Virgin"
- Kapinovo "St. Nicolas "
- Merdanski "St. Forty Martyrs "
- Patriarchal Monastery of the Holy Trinity
- Plakovski "St. Prophet Elijah "
- Transfiguration Monastery
- Prisovski "St. Archangel Michael "
- Prisovski "St. Panteleimon "

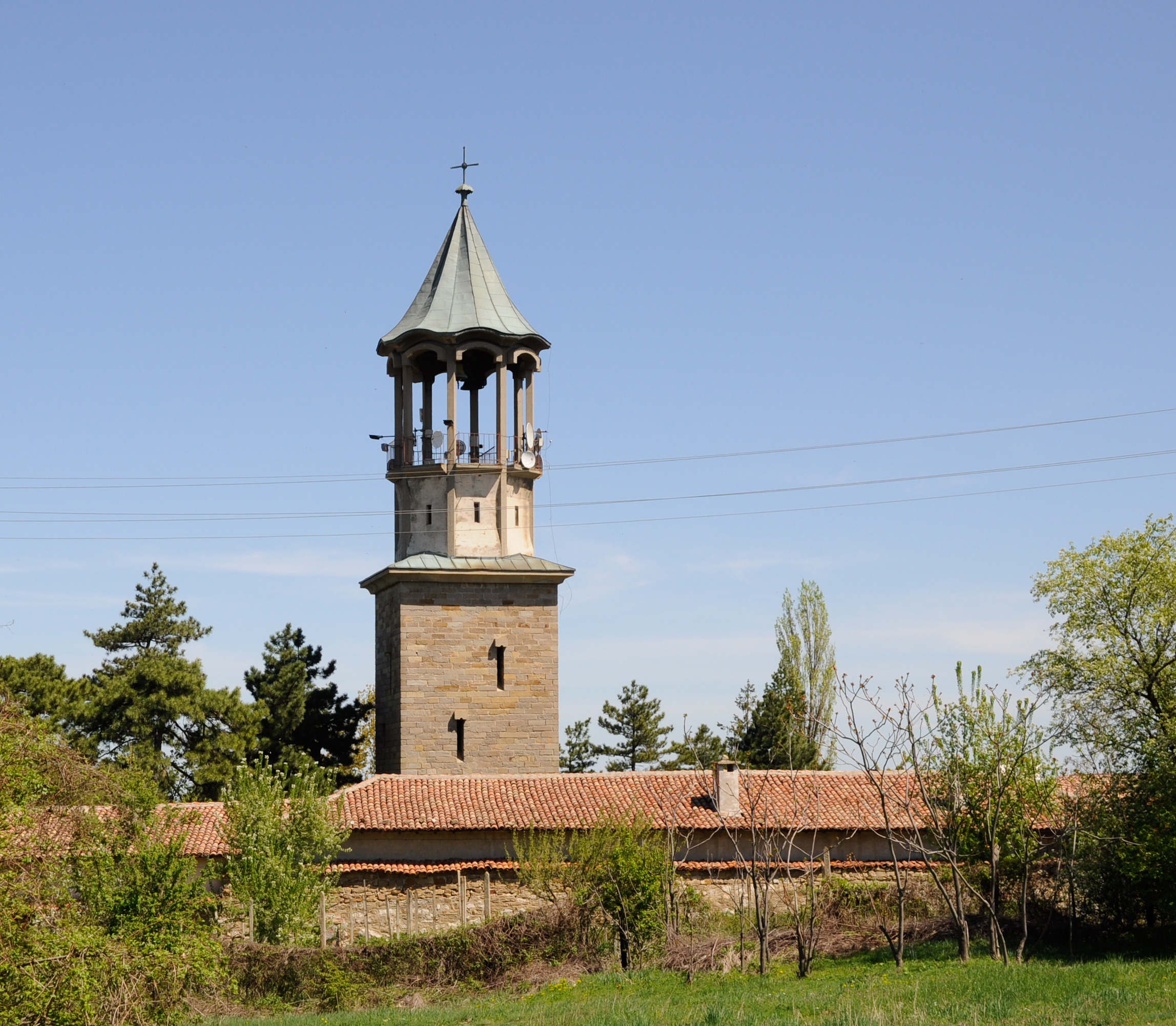
Peter and Paul Monastery

=== Gorna Oryahovitsa vicarage ===
- Gornooryahovski "St.. Prophet Elijah "
- Lyaskovski "St.St. Peter and Paul "(Peter and Paul Monastery)

=== Gabrovo vicarage ===
- Sokolski Monastery

=== Dryanovo vicarage ===
- Dryanovo Monastery

=== Elena vicarage ===
- Buynyovski "St. Prophet Elijah "
- Mariinsky monastery "St. Transfiguration of Our Lord"

=== Svishtov vicarage ===
- Svishtov Monastery "St. Ap. Peter and Paul "
- Svishtov Monastery "St. Mary "

=== Sevlievo vicarage ===
Batoshevski monastery "Blessed Virgin" Batoshevski monastery "Dormition of the Mother of God"

== Structure ==
- Veliko Tarnovo spiritual district
- Gabrovo spiritual district
- Gorna Oryahovitsa spiritual district
- Dryanovo spiritual district
- Elena spiritual district
- Nikopol spiritual district
- Pavlikeni spiritual district
- Svishtov spiritual district
- Sevlievo spiritual district

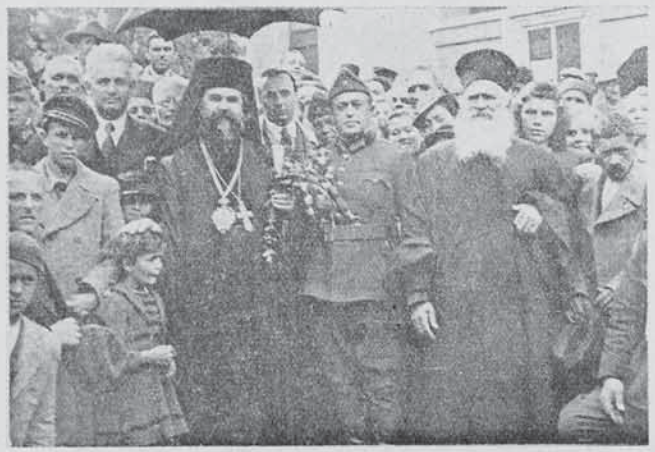
Metropolitan Sofronius

== Bishops ==
- Joseph (Rafailov) (1914-1918)
- Philip (Penchev) (1920-1935)
- Sofronii (Chavdarov) (1935-1961)
- Stefan (Staikov) (1962-1992)
- Gregory (Stefanov) (1994-)
