= Sveta gora (hill) =

Hill in Veliko Tarnovo, Bulgaria

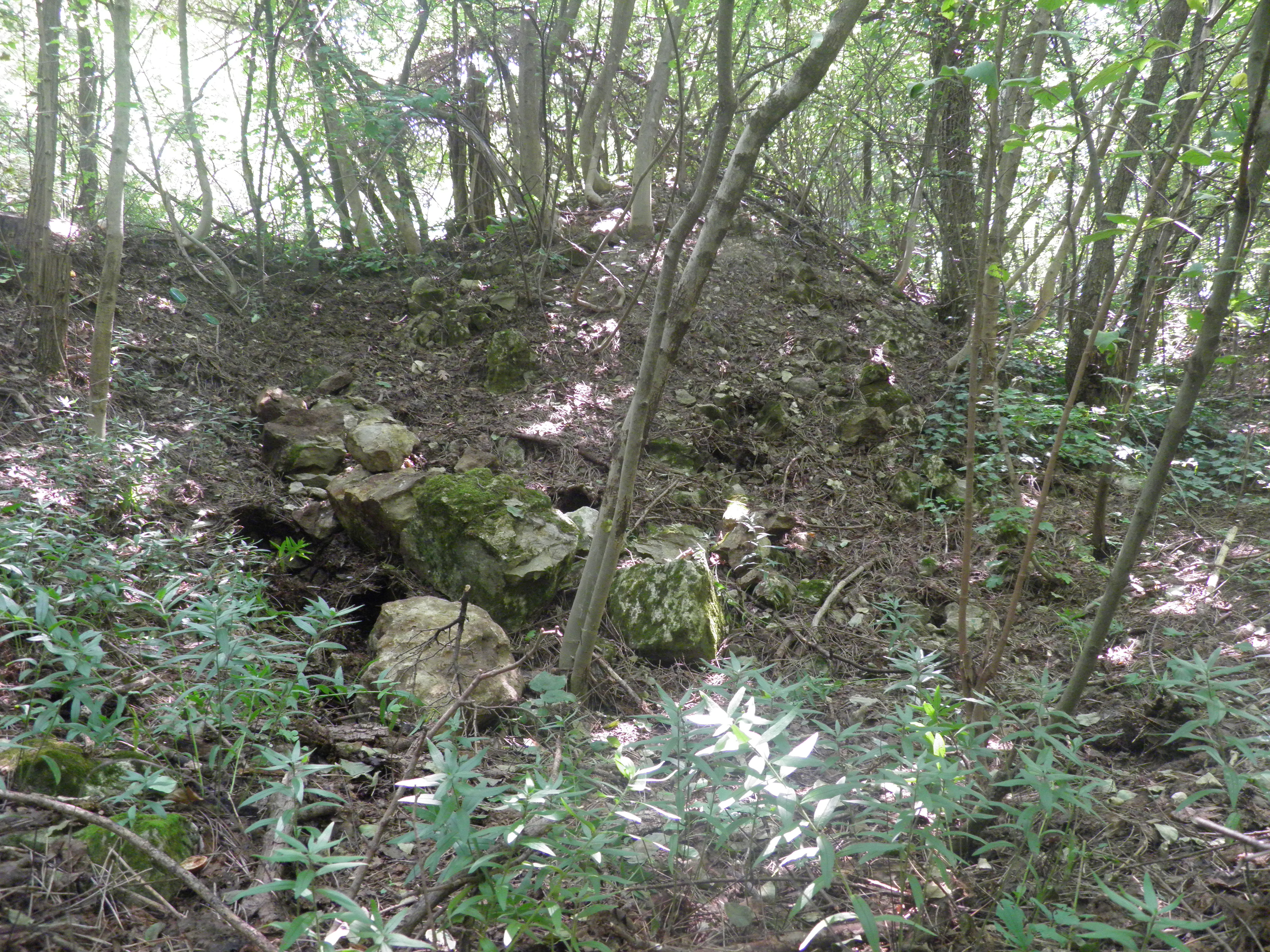
Monastery ruins in Sveta Gora, Tarnovo, Bulgaria.

Sveta gora (Bulgarian: Света гора, lit. 'Holy Mountain') is a hill in Tarnovgrad (today Veliko Tarnovo) that used to be a spiritual and literary center in the Second Bulgarian Empire.

== History ==
According to historians, legends and the ruins, the hill became a religious center at the end of 12th century. Several monasteries were built on Sveta gora, including Orthodox monastery St. Mary Odigitriya. In this monastery, the Tarnovo Literary School was established by Euthymius of Tarnovo. Monastery around Veliko Tarnovo and Arbanassi as Patriarchal Monastery of the Holy Trinity were also part of this spiritual center. During the Ottoman rule, the hill were changed to a park and place for jollity.
