= Zograf =

Zograf may refer to:

- Zograf Monastery, Bulgarian monastery on Mount Athos (Greece)

- Saint George the Zograf, the icon of St. George in Zograf Monastery
- Zograf Codex, a Gospel originating from Zograf Monastery

- Zograf Peak, Antarctica
- Zograf, Bulgaria, a village in Bulgaria
- Zograf Longin, Serbian icon painter
- Zograf Radul, Serbian archpriest, writer, painter, and woodcarver
- Zograf (surname)

== See also ==
- Zografos (disambiguation)
- Zografou (disambiguation)
