= Jewish religious clothing =

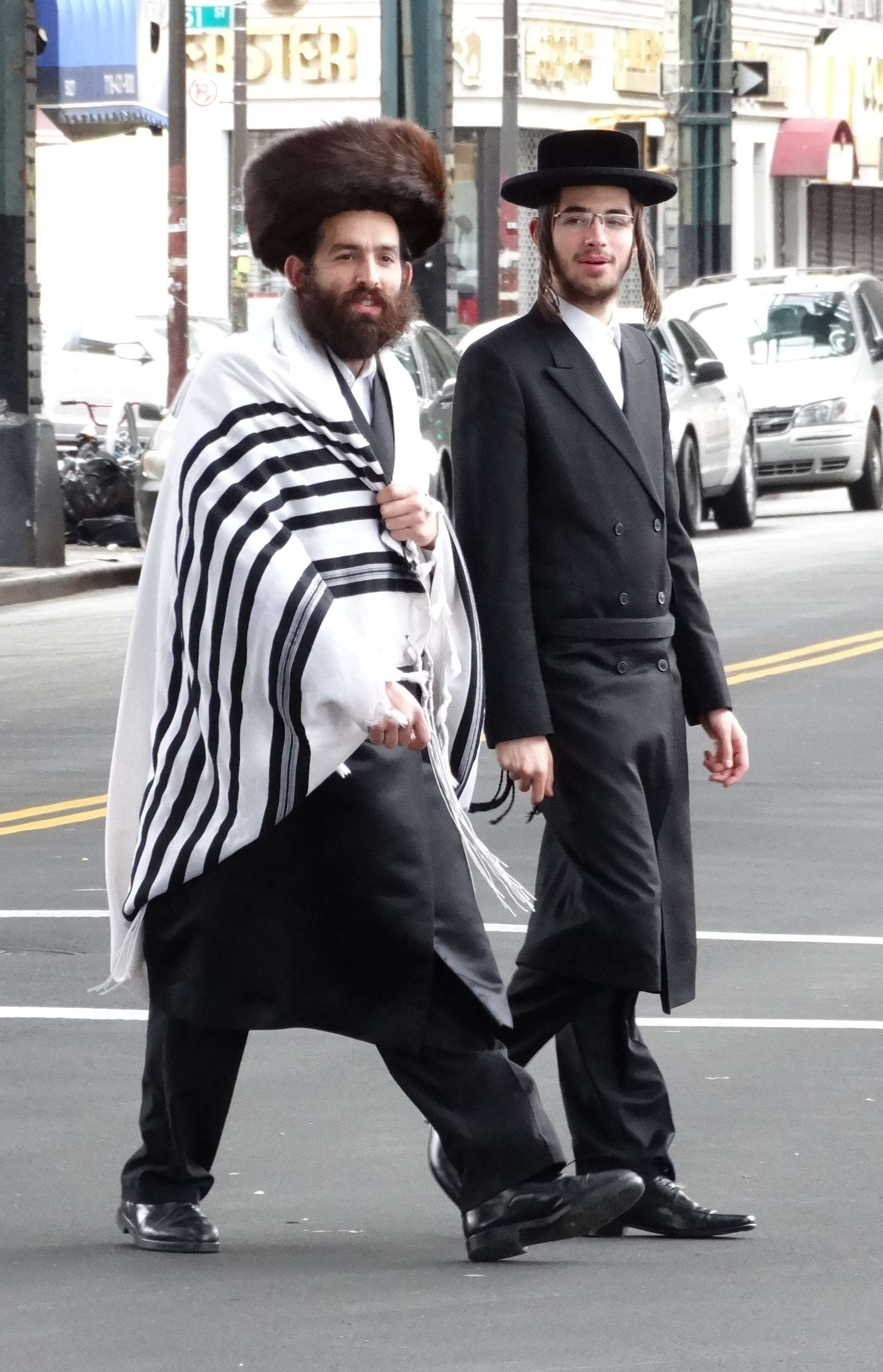
Hasidic men in Borough Park, Brooklyn. The man on the left is wearing a shtreimel and a tallit, and the other man traditional Hasidic garb: long suit, black hat, and gartel.

Jewish religious clothing is apparel worn by Jews in connection with the practice of the Jewish religion. Jewish religious clothing has changed over time while maintaining the influences of biblical commandments and Jewish religious law regarding clothing and modesty (tzniut). Contemporary styles in the wider culture also have a bearing on Jewish religious clothing, although this extent is limited.

== Historical background ==
The Torah set forth rules for dress that, following later rabbinical tradition, were interpreted as setting Jews apart from the communities in which they lived.

Classical Greek and Roman sources, that often ridicule many aspects of Jewish life, do not remark on their clothing and subject it to caricature, as they do when they talk about Celtic, Germanic, and Iranian peoples, and mock their different modes of dress. Cultural anthropologist Eric Silverman argues that Jews in the late antiquity period used clothes and hair-styles like the people around them. At 2 Maccabees 4:12, it is said that the Maccabees slaughtered Jewish youths guilty of Hellenizing in wearing caps typical of Greek youths.

In the Mishnaic period, as well as in many Islamic countries until the mid-20th century, Jewish men typically wore a tunic (Hebrew: חלוק, romanized: ḥaluq), instead of trousers. In the same countries, many different local regulations emerged to make Christian and Jewish dhimmis look distinctive in their public appearance. In 1198, the Almohad caliph Yaqub al-Mansur decreed Jews must wear dark blue garb with very large sleeves and a grotesquely oversized hat; his son altered the colour to yellow, a change that may have influenced Catholic ordinances some time later. German ethnographer Erich Brauer (1895–1942) noted that in Yemen of his time, Jews were not allowed to wear clothing of any color besides blue. Earlier, in Jacob Saphir's time (1859), they would wear outer garments that were "utterly black".

In France, during the Middle Ages, Jewish men typically wore trousers and chemise, thought by Rashi to have been equivalent to the tunic worn by Jewish men of the east.

== Men's clothing ==
Many Jewish men historically wore a turban or sudra, a tunic, a tallit, and sandals in summer. Oriental Jewish men in late-Ottoman and British Mandate Palestine would wear the tarbush on their heads.

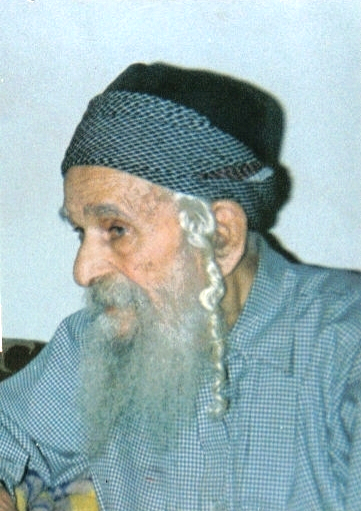
A Yemenite Jewish elder wearing a sudra with central hat

=== Tallit, tzitzit ===
The tallit is a Jewish prayer shawl worn while reciting morning prayers as well as in the synagogue on Shabbat and holidays. In Yemen, the wearing of such garments was not unique to prayer time alone but was worn the entire day. In many Ashkenazi communities, a tallit is worn only after marriage. The tallit has special twined and knotted fringes known as tzitzit attached to its four corners. It is sometimes referred to as Arba kanefot (lit. 'four corners') although the term is more common for a tallit katan, an undergarment with tzitzit. According to the Biblical commandments, tzitzit must be attached to any four-cornered garment, and a thread with a blue dye known as tekhelet was originally included in the tzitzit. However, the missing blue thread does not impair the validness of the white.

Jewish tradition varies with respect to burial with or without a tallit. While all the deceased are buried in tachrichim (burial shrouds), some communities (Yemenite Jews) do not bury their dead in their tallit. The Shulhan Arukh and the Arba'ah Turim, following the legal opinion of Nahmanides, require burying the dead with their tallit, and which has become the general practice amongst most religious Jews. Among others, the matter is dependent upon custom.

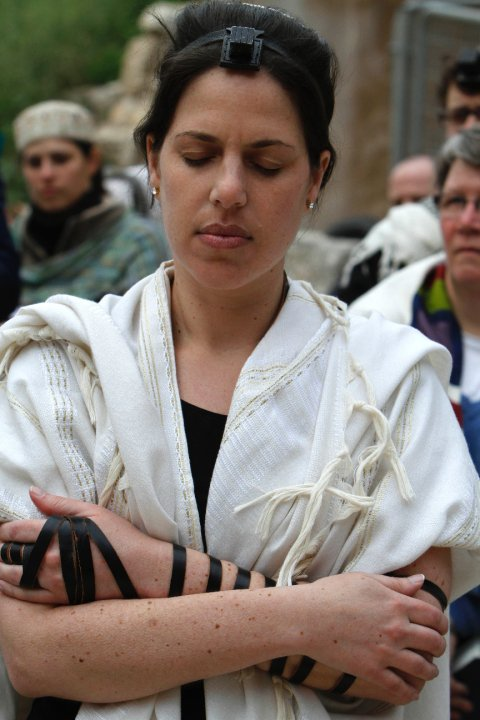
A Jewish woman praying with a tallit and tefillin

Since tzitzit are considered to be a time-bound commandment, only men are required to wear them. Authorities have differed as to whether women are prohibited, permitted or encouraged to wear them. Medieval authorities tended toward leniency, with more prohibitive rulings gaining in precedence since the 16th century. Conservative Judaism regards women as exempt from wearing tzitzit, not as prohibited, and the tallit has become more common among Conservative women since the 1970s. Some progressive Jewish women choose to take on the obligations of tzitzit and tefillin, and it has become common for a girl to receive a tallit when she becomes bat mitzvah.

=== Kippah ===
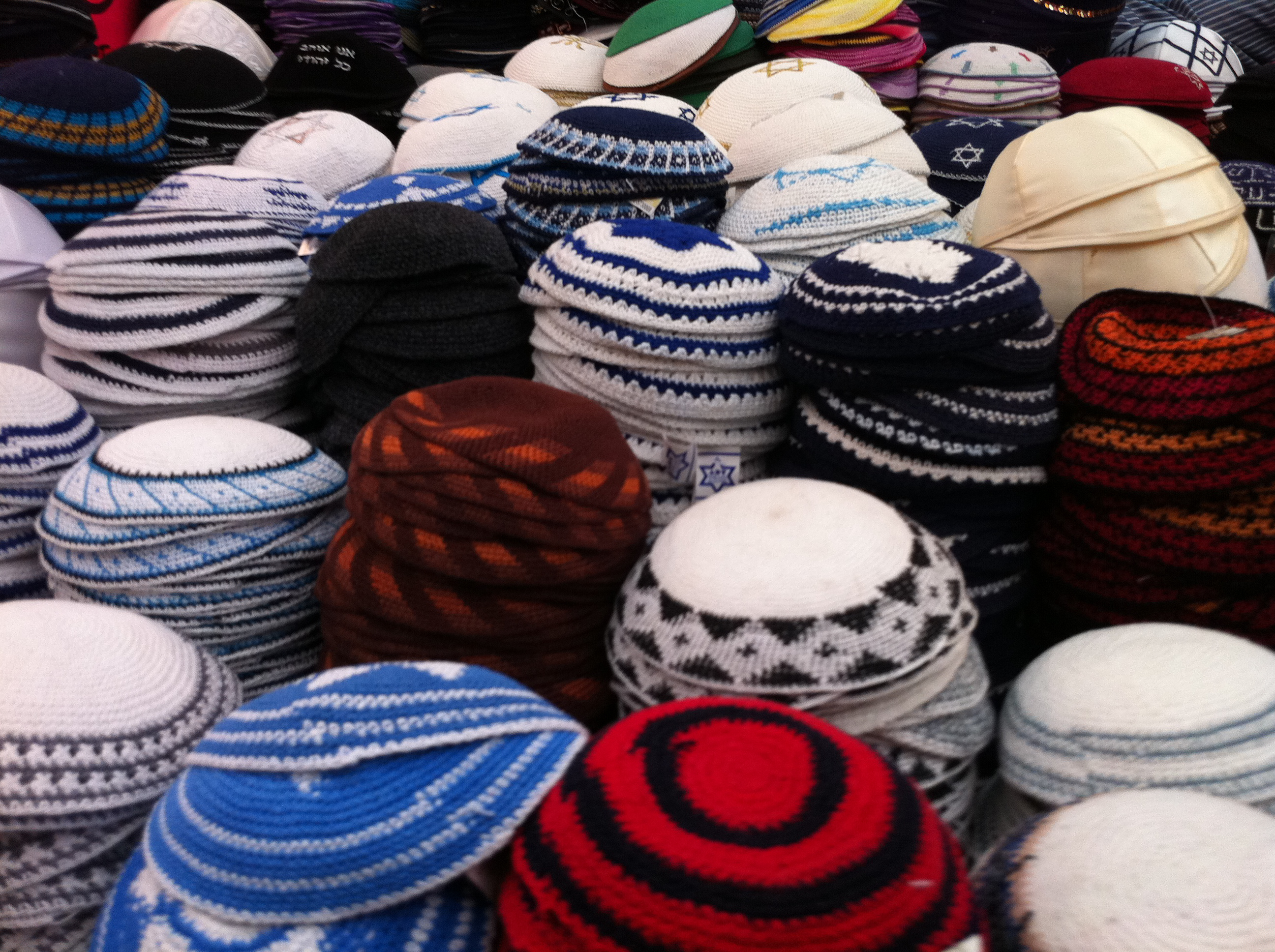
Kippahs sold in the Mahane Yehuda Market, Jerusalem

A kippah or yarmulke (also called a kappel) is a thin, slightly-rounded skullcap traditionally worn at all times by Orthodox Jewish men, and sometimes by both men and women in Conservative and Reform communities. Its use is associated with demonstrating respect and reverence for God. Jews in Arab lands did not traditionally wear yarmulkes, but rather larger, rounded, brimless hats, such as the kufi or tarboush.

=== Kittel ===
A kittel (Yiddish: קיטל, romanized: kitl) is a white, knee-length, cotton robe worn by Jewish prayer leaders and some Orthodox Jews on the High Holy Days. In some families, the head of the household wears a kittel at the Passover seder, while in other families all married men wear them. In many Ashkenazi Orthodox circles, it is customary for the groom to wear a kittel under the chuppah (wedding canopy).

== Women's clothing ==
Ezra the Scribe is said to have made one of the earliest enactments on women's attire, requiring all Jewish women to be girded with a wide belt (waist band) (Hebrew: סינר), whether from the front or from the back, out of modesty (Babylonian Talmud, Baba Kama 82a). In subsequent years, the Sages of Israel forbade Jewish women from wearing any predominantly red colored accoutrement, as it attracts undue attention to themselves.

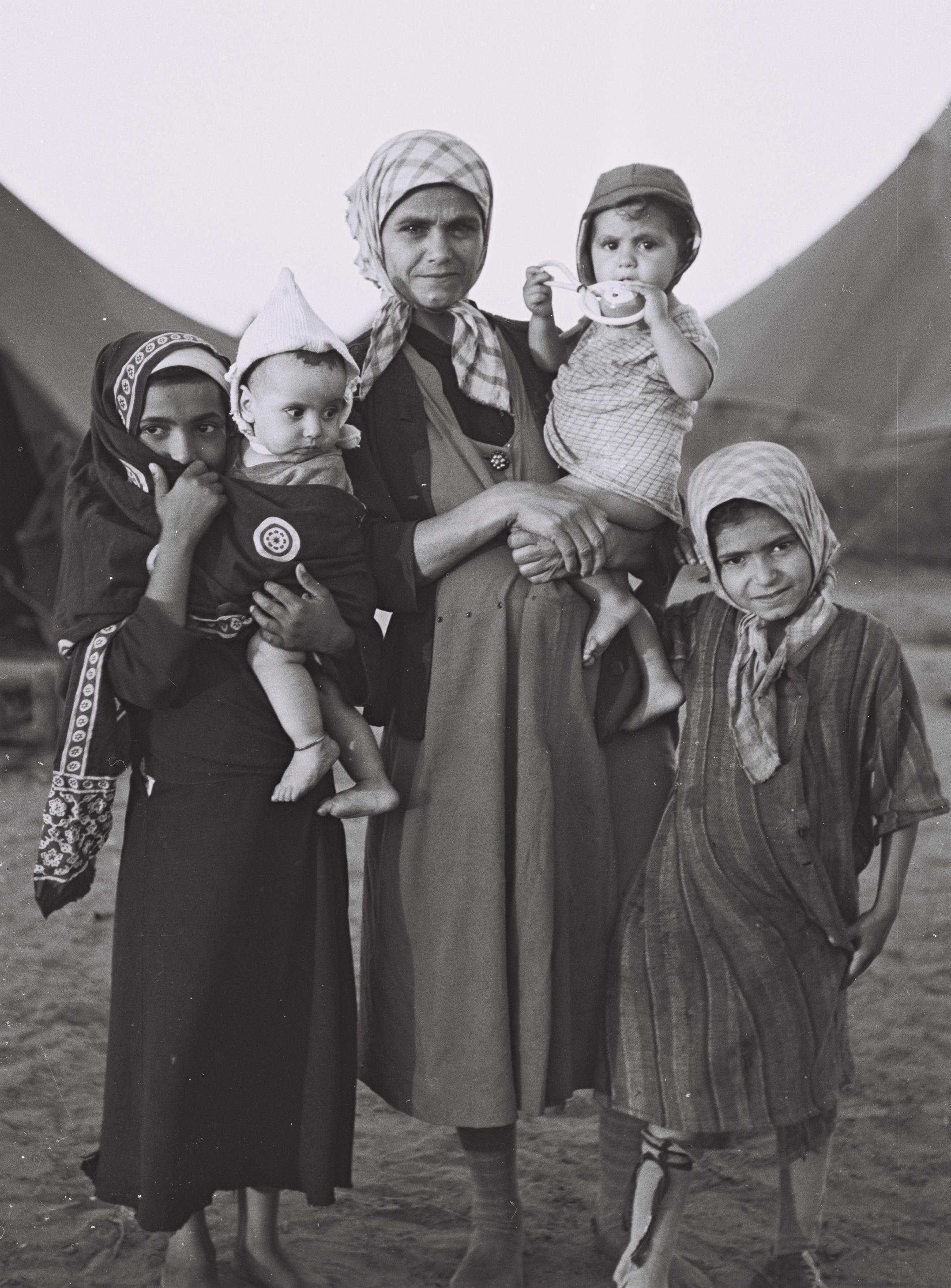
Jewish Yemenite women and children in a refugee camp near Aden, Yemen in 1949. According to Jewish religious law, a married woman must cover her hair

Married observant Jewish women wear a scarf (tichel or mitpahat), snood, hat, beret, or sometimes a wig (sheitel) in order to conform with the requirement of Jewish religious law that married women cover their hair.

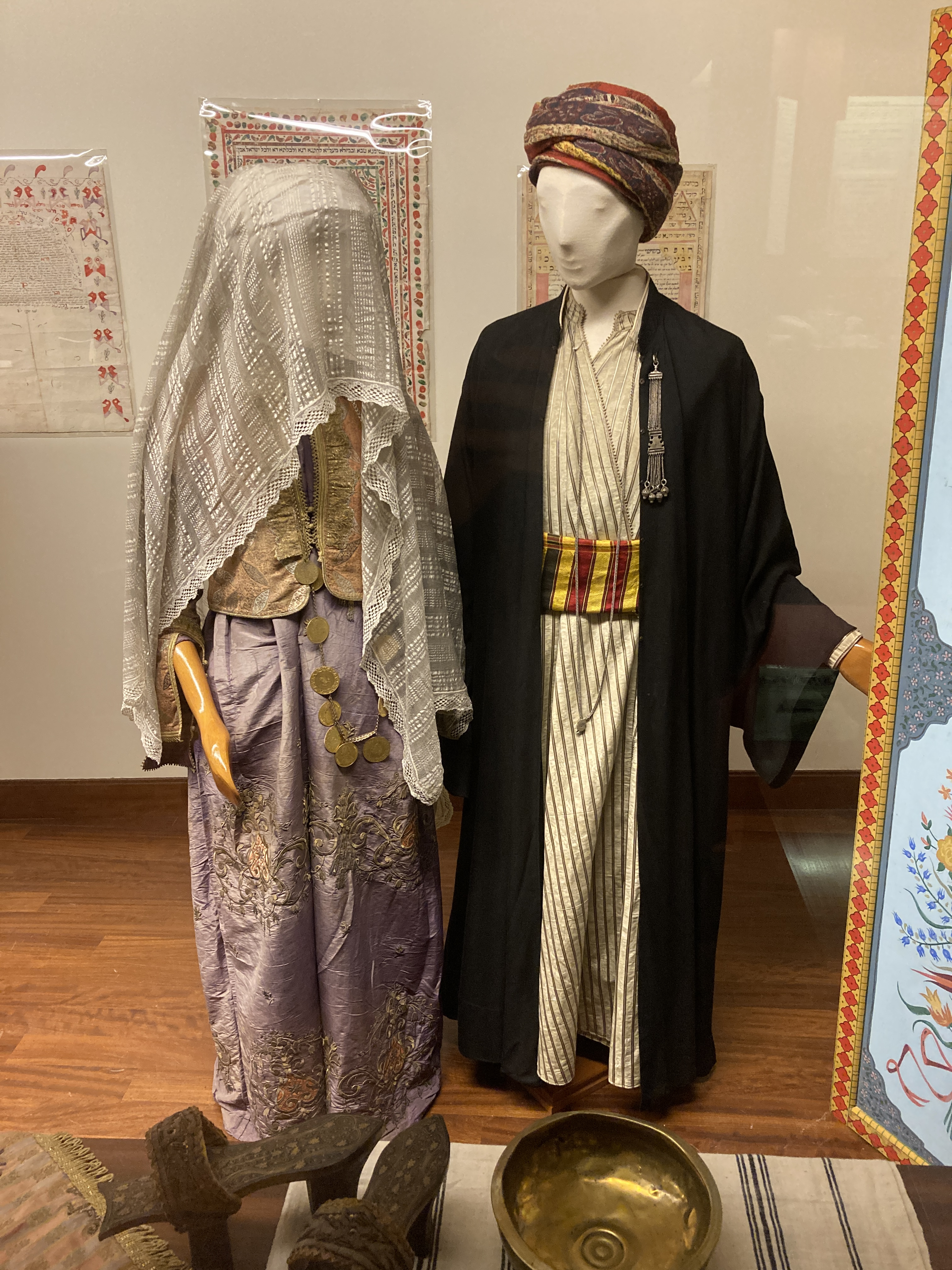
A Greek Sephardic couple in wedding costume ca. late 19th century. The woman wears a veil in accordance with wedding custom.

Jewish women were distinguished from others in the western regions of the Roman Empire by their custom of veiling in public. The custom of veiling was shared by Jews with others in the eastern regions. The custom petered out among Roman women, but was retained by Jewish women as a sign of their identification as Jews. The custom has been retained among Orthodox women. Evidence drawn from the Talmud shows that pious Jewish women would wear shawls over their heads when they would leave their homes, but there was no practice of fully covering the face. In the medieval era, Jewish women started veiling their faces under the influence of the Islamic societies they lived in. In some Muslim regions such as in Baghdad, Jewish women veiled their faces until the 1930s. In the more lax Kurdish regions, Jewish women did not cover their faces.

== Jewish vs gentile customs ==
Based on the rabbinic traditions of the Talmud, the 12th century philosopher Maimonides forbade emulating gentile dress and apparel when those same items of clothing have immodest designs, or that they are connected somehow to an idolatrous practice, or are worn because of some superstitious practice (i. e., "the ways of an Amorite").

A question was posed to 15th-century Rabbi Joseph Colon (Maharik) regarding "gentile clothing" and whether or not a Jew who wears such clothing transgresses a biblical prohibition that states, "You shall not walk in their precepts" (Leviticus 18:3). In a protracted responsum, Rabbi Colon wrote that any Jew who might be a practising physician is permitted to wear a physician's cape (traditionally worn by gentile physicians on account of their expertise in that particular field of science and their wanting to be recognized as such), and that the Jewish physician who wore it has not infringed upon any law in the Torah, even though Jews were not wont to wear such garments in former times. He noted that there is nothing attributed to "superstitious" practice by their wearing such a garment, while, at the same time, there isn't anything promiscuous or immodest about wearing such a cape, neither is it worn out of haughtiness. Moreover, he has understood from Maimonides (Hilkhot Avodat Kokhavim 11:1) that there is no commandment requiring a fellow Jew to seek out and look for clothing which would make them stand out as "different" from what is worn by gentiles, but rather, only to make sure that what a Jew might wear is not an "exclusive" gentile item of clothing. He noted that wearing a physician's cape is not an exclusive gentile custom, noting, moreover, that since the custom to wear the cape varies from place to place, and that, in France, physicians do not have it as a custom to wear such capes, it cannot therefore be an exclusive gentile custom.

According to Rabbi Colon, modesty was still a criterion for wearing gentile clothing, writing: "...even if Israel made it as their custom [to wear] a certain item of clothing, while the Gentiles [would wear] something different, if the Israelite garment should not measure up to [the standard established in] Judaism or of modesty more than what the Gentiles hold as their practice, there is no prohibition whatsoever for an Israelite to wear the garment that is practised among the Gentiles, seeing that it is in [keeping with] the way of fitness and modesty just as that of Israel."

Rabbi Joseph Karo (1488–1575), following in the footsteps of Colon, ruled in accordance with Colon's teaching in his seminal work Beit Yosef on the Tur (Yoreh De'ah §178), and in his commentary Kessef Mishneh (on Maimonides' Mishne Torah, Hilkhot Avodat Kokhavim 11:1), making the wearing of gentile clothing contingent upon three factors: 1) that they not be promiscuous clothing; 2) not be clothing linked to an idolatrous practice; 3) not be clothing that was worn because of some superstitious practice (or "the way of the Amorites"). Rabbi Moses Isserles (1530–1572) opines that to these strictures can be added one additional prohibition of wearing clothes that are a "custom" for them (the gentiles) to wear, that is to say, an exclusive gentile custom where the clothing is immodest. Rabbi and posek Moshe Feinstein (1895–1986) subscribed to the same strictures.

== See also ==
- Biblical clothing
- Israeli fashion
- Jewish hat
- Kaftan
- Religious clothing
- Bekishe
- Head covering for Jewish women
- Gartel
- Ephod
- Haredi burqa sect
- Spodik
- Kashket
