= Zograf (surname) =

Zograf is a historical Macedonian, Bulgarian, Serbian, Russian and Albanian personal appellation, later used as pen name and surname. In the Albanian version is in the form of Zografi. It comes from the Greek word for icon painter (zografos, Greek: Ζωγράφος). It may refer to:

- Zahari Zograf (1810–1853), Bulgarian painter
- Dičo Zograf, Macedonian painter
- Dimitar Zograf, Bulgarian painter
- Aleksandar Zograf, Serbian cartoonist
- Georgi Veselinov – Zograf, Bulgarian painter
- Nikolay Zograf, Russian biologist
- Metropolitan Jovan Zograf, Serbian monk and painter
- Dhimitër Zografi, Albanian politician
- Kostandin and Athanas Zografi, Albanian painters

== See also ==
- Zografski
