= Zografski =

Zografski (Зографски) is a Bulgarian surname. Notable people with the surname include:

- Emil Zografski (born 1968), Bulgarian ski jumper
- Parteniy Zografski (died 1876), Bulgarian cleric
- Vladimir Zografski (born 1993), Bulgarian ski jumper
- Tomislav Zografski (1934–2000), Macedonian composer

== See also ==
- Zograf (surname)
- Zografos
