= Stanislav Dospevski =

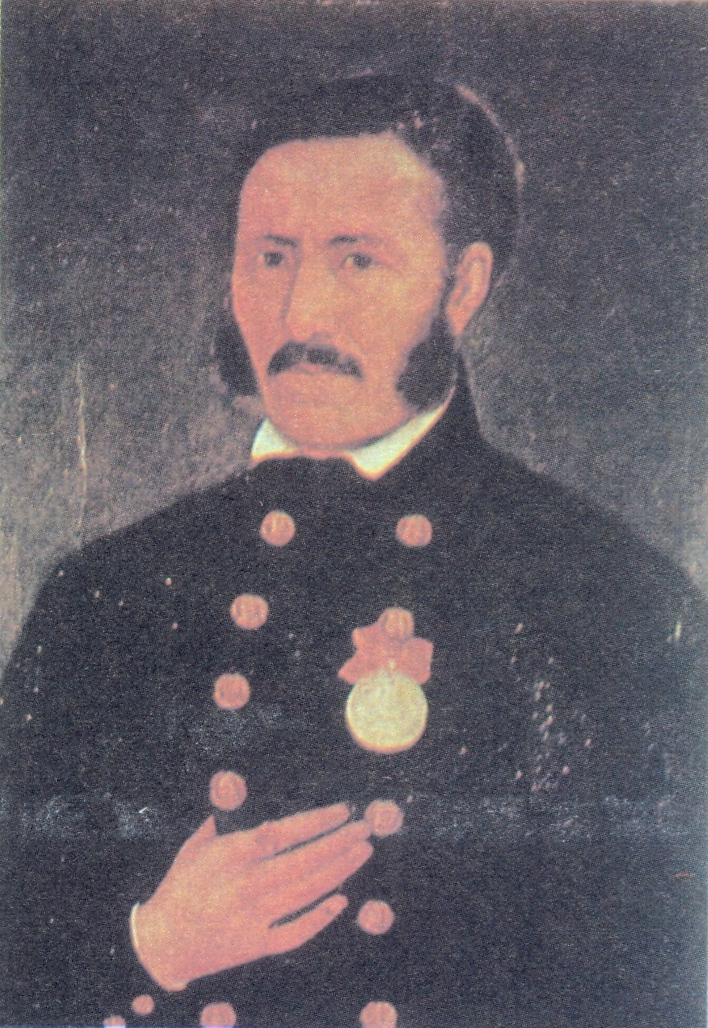
Self-portrait of Stanislav Dospevski, c. 1872

Stanislav Dospevski (Bulgarian: Станислав Доспевски) is the name assumed by Zafir Zograf (Зафир Зограф) (1823-1878), the son of Dimitar Zograf and nephew of the famed Bulgarian icon and mural painter, Zahari Zograf. He is a notable representative of the Samokov artistic school and one of the most important painters and icon-painters of the Bulgarian Revival. Dospevski is a reformer of church painting and one of the creators of secular painting. He is the first Bulgarians to have received academic artistic training.

== Biography ==
Stanislav Dospevski was born on 3 December 1823 in Samokov. He began his training in his native town, Samokov, and then continued his education in Plovdiv. From an early age he had been helping his father in his icon painting for the Plovdiv church of Sveta Nedelya (St Nedelya), thus acquiring early artistic experience. In 1850 Dospevski went to Moscow, where he started his studies at the Moscow School of Painting, Sculpture and Architecture, and later from 1853 to 1856 he studied at the Imperial Academy of Arts in St Petersburg in Fyodor Bruni’s class.

After his return to Bulgaria he took on the name of Dospevski and became a pioneer of the secular realistic portrait in Bulgarian art. He lived in Pazardzhik and Samokov, but continued to paint in Plovdiv. During the Russo-Turkish War of 1877–1878 he was arrested by the Ottoman government. He died in prison in Istanbul on 6 January 1878.

One of the elementary schools in Samokov, NU “Stanislav Dospevski”, bears his name. The great-granddaughter of Stanislav Dospevski is the translator Neli Dospevska.

== Gallery ==
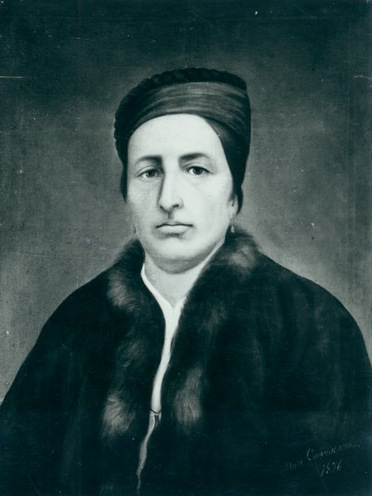
Portrait of Катерина Захари Зографска

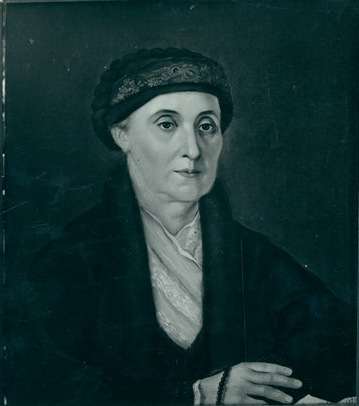
Portrait of Елисавета В. Чалъкова

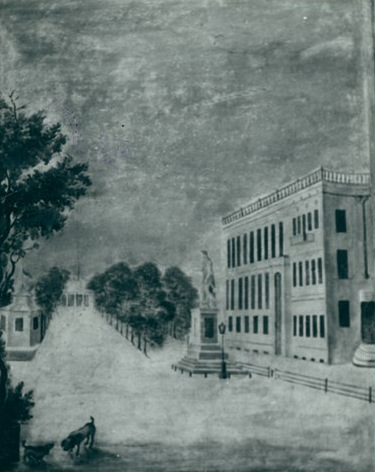
Pazardzhik
