= Agnes Blannbekin =

Austrian Beguine and Christian mystic (c. 1244 – 1315)

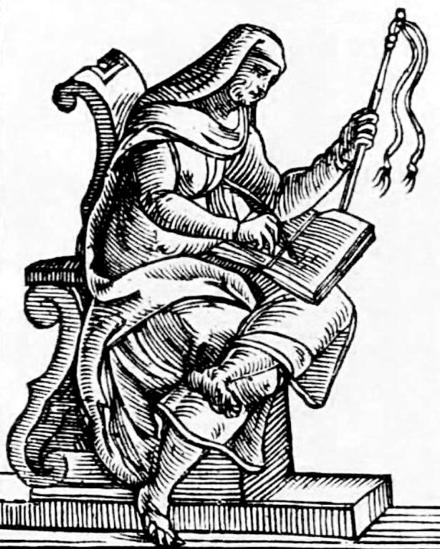
- Born: c. 1244; Plambach, Duchy of Austria
- Died: 10 March 1315 (aged 70–71); Vienna, Duchy of Austria
- Occupation: Franciscan tertiary
- Writing career
- Language: Middle High German, Medieval Latin
- Genre: Revelations
- Notable work: Venerabilis Agnetis Blannbekin
- Movement: Beguine Christian mysticism

Agnes Blannbekin (/ˈblænbiːkən/; c. 1244 – 10 March 1315) was an Austrian Beguine and Christian mystic. She was also referred to as Saint Agnes Blannbekin or the Venerable Agnes Blannbekin, though never beatified or canonized by the Roman Catholic Church. Her revelations were compiled by an anonymous confessor before being transcribed by the monk Ermenrich and later published in 1731 as Venerabilis Agnetis Blannbekin. The copies were confiscated by the Society of Jesus, and only two manuscripts survived. One was destroyed in a fire at the Strasbourg library in 1870. The surviving manuscript, currently owned by a Cistercian convent in Zwettl, Austria, was not released until the 20th century. Although Blannbekin is best remembered today for her visions, during her life she was known for her ministry to the urban population and her strange and provocative expressions of faith.

== Life ==
Blannbekin was likely born in Plambach, Austria to a peasant family; due to her Life and Revelations being the only source of information from her directly, little is known with certainty. Her surname, which is also sometimes spelled Blanbakin, is a derivation of the name of this village (i.e., Plambachen). At the age of seven or eight, Blannbekin began secretly giving her meals to the poor. By the age of ten or eleven, she began craving the sacramental bread. In around 1260, she joined the Third Order of Saint Francis in Vienna; for the rest of her life she refused to eat meat, claiming the body of Christ was enough meat for her.

During services and prayers in her early teenage years, Blannbekin began to hear voices which explained spiritual mysteries. Like her more famous contemporary, Angela of Foligno, Blannbekin's revelations were dictated to an anonymous Franciscan confessor, and were transcribed by the Franciscan friar Ermenrich possibly as early as 1318; like many women mystics during this time, Blannbekin herself was illiterate. Devotional texts by women mystics that are "co-authored" in this way are thought to suffer from interference from the filtering and dilution of their male scribes. Understandings of the "construction of authorial personae" necessitate doubts of the validity of the transcriptions.

Her visions are typified as distinctive to high medieval devotionalism and used "familiar teaching techniques such as enumerating twelve glories of the Virgin, five types of confessors, and four ways of receiving the eucharist, made memorable through vivid color symbolism and animal imagery," though marked by the eroticism ingrained in them.

Blannbekin's contemporaries were quick to show contempt for her, and she carried the reputation of being "odd" even when she held respect. In one story, she was derided for compulsively bowing toward a basement window as she walked through town, but regained respectability after a stolen Eucharist was discovered in that said basement; however, occasions like these led to her feeling "wrongly accused and defamed".

== Association with extremist religious consumption ==
At the age of seven or eight, Blannbekin began secretly giving her meals to the poor; she would continue performing acts of both charity and self-starvation throughout her life. By the age of ten or eleven, she began craving the sacramental bread. In around 1260, she joined the Third Order of Saint Francis in Vienna, and for the rest of her life she refused to eat meat, claiming the body of Christ was enough meat for her; this led to her joining the legacy of mystics who used food and consumption (or lack thereof) as a vehicle for the soul to express its desire for God, because food was "a central metaphor [and] the most direct way of encountering God." Caroline Bynum writes:

…to eat Christ is to become Christ. The Christ one becomes, in the reception of communion and in the imitation of asceticism, is the bleeding and suffering Christ of the cross. The flesh of Jesus—both flesh as body and flesh as food—is at the very center of female piety. And this flesh is simultaneously pleasure and pain.

Blannbekin also joined the ranks of spiritual women who often fasted for long periods to induce a "suffering" as an offering to Christ. Gluttony ("the major form of lust") is sinful in the Christian faith, and as it is the binary opposite of fasting ("the most painful renunciation"), the church is predisposed to indulge fasting as a saintly act—however, this opens a channel for extremism that has been renounced in recent decades. Like saints receiving stigmata, spiritual women who practiced extreme fasting “felt that [their] suffering was service—that it was one with Christ's suffering and that it therefore substituted for the suffering of others, both their bodily ills and their time in purgatory, and viewed the physicality of their starvation as their bodies "quite literally [becoming] Christ's macerated and saving flesh." Through this physical performance of religiosity, pious revelations had a literality that enhanced the fulfillment of worship for medieval Christians.

== Association with mystic eroticism ==
Although not all of her revelations were considered obscene, they included visions of monks, women, and Jesus naked, and described pseudo-sexual ecstasy at receiving them. In one vision, she claimed to have felt the foreskin of Jesus in her mouth:

Crying and with compassion, she began to think about the foreskin of Christ, where it may be located [after the Resurrection]. And behold, soon she felt with the greatest sweetness on her tongue a little piece of skin alike the skin in an egg, which she swallowed. After she had swallowed it, she again felt the little skin on her tongue with sweetness as before, and again she swallowed it. And this happened to her about a hundred times. And when she felt it so frequently, she was tempted to touch it with her finger. And when she wanted to do so, that little skin went down her throat on its own. And it was told to her that the foreskin was resurrected with the Lord on the day of resurrection. And so great was the sweetness of tasting that little skin that she felt in all [her] limbs and parts of the limbs a sweet transformation.

Blannbekin described herself as continually beset with visions throughout the day, which she described as imber lacrimarum, or a "rain of tears" from God. Many of these visions involved bright lights, and in one she described being "so filled with light within that she could gaze at herself." As with the foreskin occasion, many of her visions involved touch, such as being kissed on the cheeks by the Lamb of God. While eating the Eucharist, Blannbekin claimed to taste Christ; on one occasion, a sexually immoral priest could not find his Eucharist, which Blannbekin claimed to have felt in her own mouth. Similarly, she described drinking a "refreshing spiritual drink" from the spear wound of Jesus. Supposed visitations from Jesus himself caused an orgastic reaction: "Agnes herself was filled with an excitement in her chest every time that God visited her that was so intense that it went through her body and that it burned as a result, not in a painful but in a most pleasurable manner."

The eroticism of Blannbekin's visions are not without precedent; other mystics also presented Christ images with sexual effects or connotations. The reputation she earned during her lifetime is thought to be more related to her behavior than the erotic content of her visions, and sexual contextualization of religious revelations for women was common.

== Criticism and support ==
Modern scholars are splintered over the themes and messages of Blannbekin. Most accounts take a gynocentric viewpoint, e.g. analyzing the erotic images of Christ in terms of feminist criticism; this presents a patterned shift in her reception: as third-wave feminism of the early 1990s reintroduced sex-positivity and Blannbekin's Life and Revelations came back into the medievalist spotlight, her work garnered a remarkable amount of support. Before this, eroticism intermingled with Christian revelations were treated disdainfully.

Additionally, modern critics are increasingly more concerned with explicating the prejudice (albeit standard) in her work:

Medieval women, like medieval men, had the choice to support or subvert Christianity's efforts to marginalize and persecute groups such as homosexuals, lepers, Jews, and people of color. Thus, we find Agnes repeating the widely known legend about the death of sodomites at the birth of Christ. She repeatedly condemns Jews, presents a negative portrayal of Ethiopians and associates dark skin with evil, and interprets leprosy as a sign of moral corruption. When read from the perspective of any of these marginalized groups, Agnes's religious beliefs are put into sharp relief as an example of Christian hegemonic strategies, often successful, to employ its subaltern members to its own ends.

While this aspect limits the universality of Blannbekin's work, it nevertheless provides scholars of medieval women's spirituality with insight into the life of a beguine whose experiences reflect themes commonly discussed in medieval mysticism.

== Death ==
Blannbekin died in Vienna on 10 March 1315, in her convent.
