= David Farley (writer) =

American author and journalist

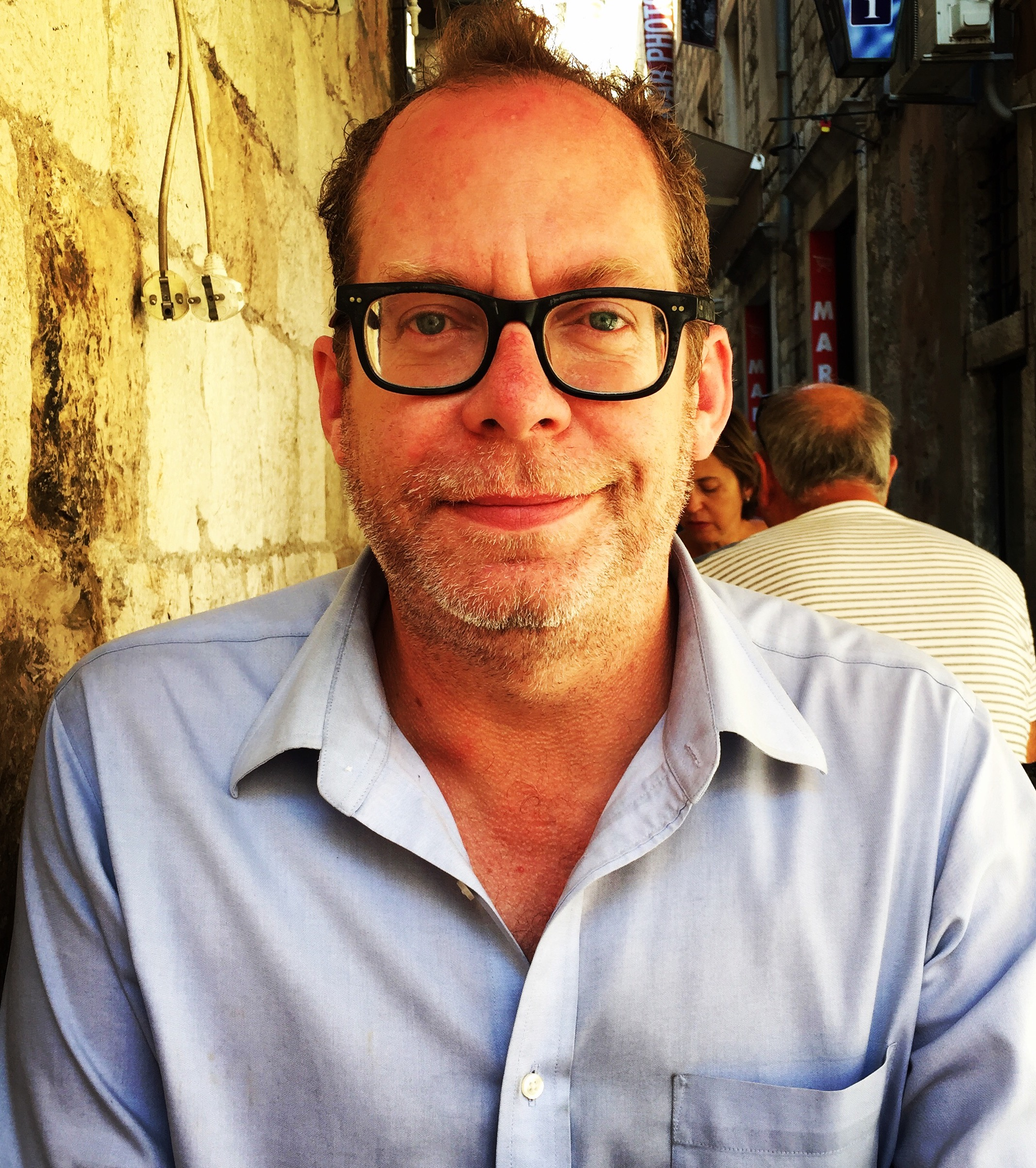
- Farley in 2015
- Born: September 25, 1971 (age 54); Dubuque, Iowa. U.S.
- Education: University of California, Santa Cruz; San Francisco State University
- Occupations: Author, journalist

David Farley (born September 25, 1971) is an American author and journalist.

Farley is originally from Dubuque, Iowa, but spent his formative years in Simi Valley, California. He graduated from Simi Valley High School and received a bachelor's degree from University of California, Santa Cruz and a master's degree in European history from San Francisco State University.

Farley writes mostly about travel, food, and culture for The Wall Street Journal, The New York Times, The Washington Post, Conde Nast Traveler, and Newsweek, among other publications. In 2006, 2010, 2013, 2015, 2018, 2019, and 2025 he won Lowell Thomas Awards from the Society of American Travel Writers for magazine articles he has written. He has lived in Prague, Paris, Rome, New York City and Berlin.

== An Irreverent Curiosity ==
An Irreverent Curiosity: In Search of the Church's Strangest Relic in Italy's Oddest Town, Farley's first book, is a narrative history/travelogue about Farley's time living in Calcata, Italy while searching for the Holy Foreskin, which was preserved in the medieval hill town's church for centuries until it went missing under mysterious circumstances in the 1980s. The book was named one of the best travel books of the year by the Los Angeles Times and WorldHum.com and one of the best books of the decade by the Dubuque Telegraph Herald. In October 2010, it won a Lowell Thomas Award for best travel book.

In December 2013, National Geographic Channel broadcast a documentary, starring Farley and based on his book, called "The Quest for the Holy Foreskin".

== Underground Worlds ==
In May 2018, publisher Black Dog & Leventhal published Farley's second book, Underground Worlds: A Guide to Spectacular Subterranean Places.
