= Hofstetten-Grünau =

- Municipality
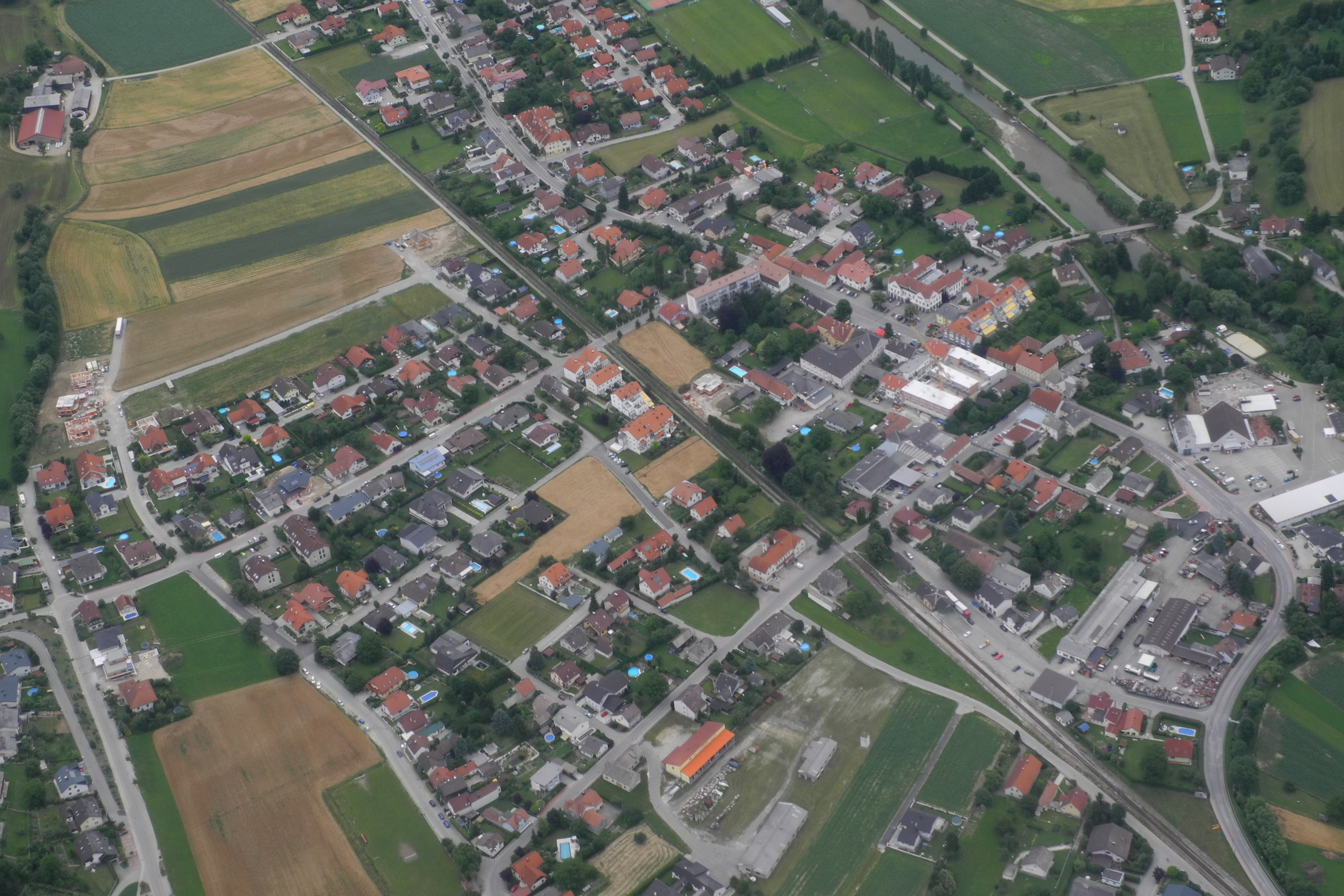
- Aerial view

- Coat of arms

- Location within Austria
- Coordinates: 48°5′N 15°30′E
- Country: Austria
- State: Lower Austria
- District: Sankt Pölten-Land

Government
  - Mayor: Arthur Rasch

Area
  - Total: 35.95 km^{2} (13.88 sq mi)
- Elevation: 317 m (1,040 ft)

Population (2018-01-01)
  - Total: 2,693
  - Density: 74.91/km^{2} (194.0/sq mi)
- Time zone: UTC+1 (CET)
  - Summer (DST): UTC+2 (CEST)
- Postal code: 3202
- Area code: 02723
- Website: http://www.hofstetten-gruenau.at

Hofstetten-Grünau is a town in the district of Sankt Pölten-Land in the Austrian state of Lower Austria.

== Population ==
Historical population
Year	Pop.	±%
1971	2,054	—
1981	2,084	+1.5%
1991	2,449	+17.5%
2001	2,569	+4.9%

== Personalities ==
It is alleged that the Christian mystic Agnes Blannbekin was born in the village of Plambach, which is now part of Hofstetten-Grünau.
