= Zografou (disambiguation) =

Zografou (Greek: Ζωγράφου) may refer to:

- Zografou, an eastern suburb of Athens, Greece
- Zograf Monastery, a Bulgarian Orthodox monastery on Mount Athos, Greece
- Zografou, Chalkidiki, a village in the municipal unit Moudania, Chalkidiki, Greece

== See also ==
- Zografos (disambiguation)
- Zograf (disambiguation)
