= Patriarchal Monastery of the Holy Trinity =

Coordinates: 43°7′25.09″N 25°37′18.36″E

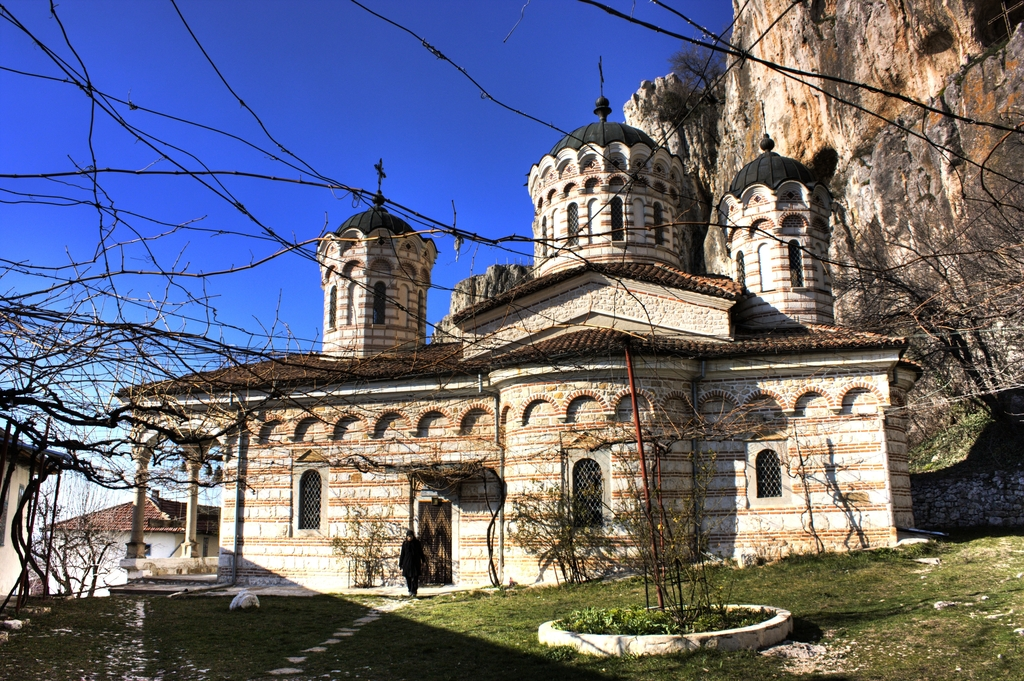
The present church of the Patriarchal Monastery of the Holy Trinity

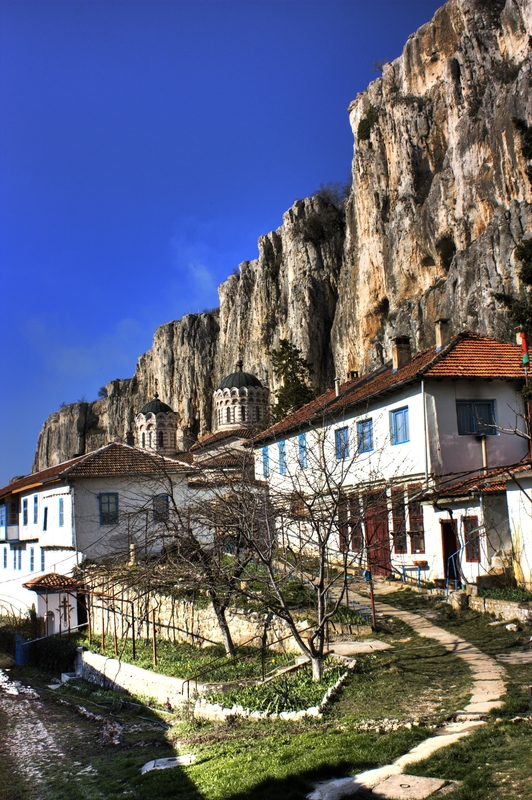
Overview of the monastery

The Patriarchal Monastery of the Holy Trinity (Bulgarian: Патриаршески манастир „Света Троица“, Patriarsheski manastir „Sveta Troitsa“) is a Bulgarian Orthodox monastery in the vicinity of Veliko Tarnovo, north central Bulgaria. Founded in the Middle Ages, it was reconstructed in 1847 and again in the mid-20th century.

== Location and early history ==
The Patriarchal Monastery is situated on the banks of the Yantra River within its Dervent Gorge. It lies some 6 kilometres (3.7 mi) north of Veliko Tarnovo, the capital of the Second Bulgarian Empire from 1185 to 1393. On the opposite bank of the river is located another medieval cloister, the Transfiguration Monastery. Next to the Patriarchal Monastery stand the cliffs of the Arbanasi mountain, part of the foothills of the central Balkan Mountains.

There are at least a few theories with regard to the monastery's exact foundation, all pointing to the Middle Ages. According to an inscription discovered during the construction of the present monastery church, it was founded on 27 January 1070 by churchwarden Georgi Prilozhnik and his son Kalin, and its patron was already the Holy Trinity. At the time, Bulgaria was under Byzantine rule, which lasted for more than a century and a half (1018–1185). Two other theories link the monastery's establishment with the religious and cultural upsurge of the Second Bulgarian Empire in the mid-14th century, under Tsar Ivan Alexander. The first one claims the Patriarchal Monastery dates from directly after a religious council in 1350; the second one, considered more likely, ties it with future Bulgarian patriarch Evtimiy of Tarnovo. According to this version, the Patriarchal Monastery was originally a cave monastery populated by Evtimiy and his students in the early 1370s. After Evtimiy was elected patriarch in 1375, the cloister acquired the honorary name Patriarchal Monastery.

In the late 14th century, the Patriarchal Monastery of the Holy Trinity was one of the major hubs of the Tarnovo Literary School, which produced masterpieces such as the Tetraevangelia of Ivan Alexander and the Tomić Psalter. However, the Fall of Tarnovo to the Ottomans on 17 July 1393 meant an end to the monastery's heyday, and by 1416 the Bulgarian Patriarchate had been subordinated to the Patriarchate of Constantinople. Despite being arsoned, it nevertheless continued to exist, and in the 18th and early 19th century it was regularly the subject of donations by the rulers of Wallachia and Moldavia, the Romanian principalities across the Danube. Charters by Ştefan Cantacuzino (1715), Grigore II Ghica (1748), Alexander Ypsilantis (1776) and Constantine Ypsilantis (1803) have been preserved, and there is direct evidence of donations by earlier voivodes like Matei Basarab.

== Present monastery ==
In the early 19th century, the Patriarchal Monastery suffered two disasters. In 1803, a brigand raid plundered its buildings, and in 1812 an outbreak of plague caused the abandonment of the already hardly active cloister. The monastery was, however, reestablished in the 1840s. The monastery church was built in 1846–1867; it was designed by the most famous architect of the Bulgarian National Revival, Kolyu Ficheto. The monastery church follows a cross-in-square plan with three domes, which were added later. Blind arches with red brickwork inside decorate the exterior, and a four-columned exonarthex marks the west entrance.

The altar of the current church was brought from the Ancient Roman ruins of Nicopolis ad Istrum. In antiquity, it was used as a pagan sacrificial altar. It has an inscription with dedications to Zeus, Hera and Athena and dates to the rule of emperor Antoninus Pius (138–161). At the base of one of the church's columns is another Roman artifact, a provincial border stone from the rule of Hadrian (117–138). The interior decoration and the iconostasis of the church were the work of Samokov painter Zahari Zograf, who was also active in the Rila Monastery, the Troyan Monastery and the nearby Transfiguration Monastery.

The church, along with the entire monastery, suffered extensive damage during an earthquake in 1913. The church was reconstructed in 1927, while the adjacent buildings were rebuilt after World War II, in 1946–1948, when the monastery was converted to a nunnery. However, Zahari Zograf's frescoes have not been restored, and the interior of the monastery church remains for the most part unpainted. At present, the monastery complex includes the main church, residential buildings, chapels dedicated to Jesus Christ and Evtimiy of Tarnovo and a well, as well as the grave of Metropolitan Joseph of Veliko Tarnovo (1870–1918).
