= Zografos =

Zografos or Zographos (Greek: Ζωγράφος [zo̞ˈɣrafo̞s], painter) is a Greek surname. Notable people with the surname include:

- Ioannis Zografos (1844–1927), Greek MP and academic, after whom the Athens suburb is named
- Christakis Zografos (1820–1898), Ottoman Greek banker and benefactor

- Georgios Christakis-Zografos or Georgios Zografos (1863-1920), his son, Greek politician and president of the Autonomous Republic of Northern Epirus
- Zografeion Lyceum, Greek school in Istanbul, Turkey, named after its benefactor Christakis Zografos
- Zographeion College, former educational institution in Northern Epirus (today in Albania), named after its benefactor Christakis Zografos

- Saint Lazarus Zographos (died 867), Byzantine monk and painter
- Panagiotis Zographos, Greek painter of the Greek War of Independence
- Giorgos Zographos (1936–2005), Greek actor and singer
- Constantine Zografos (1796–1856), Greek physician, politician and diplomat, who took part in the 3 September 1843 Revolution
- Michail Zografos, Greek judge linked to the Trial of the Six (1922)
- Fotis Zografos, Greek swimmer and athlete, active in the early 20th century, member of the Aris Water Polo Club
- Agesilaos Zografos, Greek swimmer and athlete, active in the early 20th century, member of the Aris Water Polo Club
- Christoforos Zografos (born 1969), Greek football referee
- Nikos Zografos, Greek-American industrial designer

== See also ==
- Zografou (disambiguation)
- Zograf (disambiguation)
