= Dimitar Zograf =

Bulgarin icon painter (1796–1860)

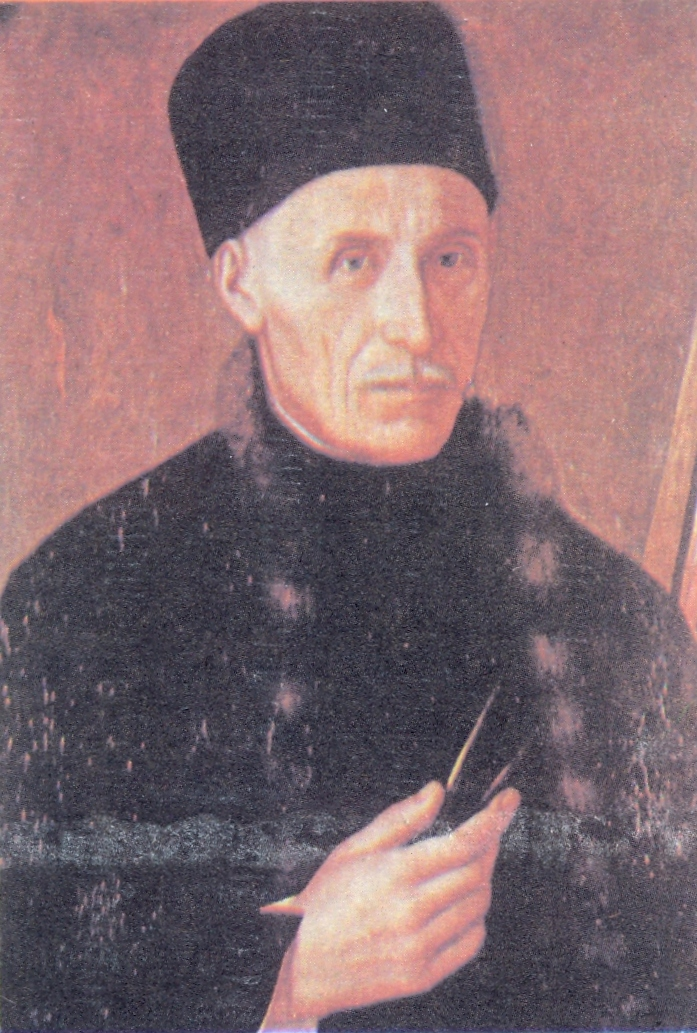
Dimitar Zograf as portrayed by his son Stanislav Dospevski

Dimitar Hristov (Bulgarian: Димитър Христов), better known as Dimitar Zograf (Димитър Зограф) (1796–1860), was a noted 19th-century Bulgarian painter known for his icons.

Born in Samokov to the family of Hristo Dimitrov, the founder of the Samokov iconographic school, Dimitar was the elder brother of the better-known painter Zahari Zograf. Dimitar was taught iconography by his father in his workshop and by his father's death in 1819 he was already an accomplished painter, taking the leadership of his father's workshop and often working for the same monasteries and architects as his father.

Dimitar educated his younger brother and practically assumed the role of a father for Zahari until about 1830. In 1831, a note evidences that the two brothers worked as almost equal. In 1822 Dimitar Zograf married Hristiyaniya and had seven children, four of whom also became icon painters. The best known of them is Stanislav Dospevski.

Unlike his brother Zahari, Dimitar did not sign his works, but they are not difficult to identify because of their unrivalled quality in the period. Together with Zahari he decorated the main church of the Rila Monastery, the largest and most famous monastery in Bulgaria.
