= Eric Silverman =

American cultural anthropologist

Eric Kline Silverman is an American cultural anthropologist, formerly a tenured Full Professor and research professor of anthropology at Wheelock College in Boston, which was dissolved as an independent institution in summer 2018. He is also a long-standing Scholar at the Women's Studies Research Center at Brandeis University. Additionally, Eric is also a Research Scholar and Writer with The Rhodes Project, a research initiative to study the lives and careers of female Rhodes Scholars, based in the UK at McAlister Olivarius.

Silverman employs a binocular approach to teaching, research, and writing that tacks between American society and other cultures worldwide. He is especially interested in ethnic identity, aesthetics, gender, religion, masculinity, fatherhood, and globalization. He has a longstanding interest in the Iatmul people of the Sepik River in Papua New Guinea, whom he has studied through anthropological fieldwork since the late 1980s - as recently as summer 2014. He also studies American Jews and Judaism. Additional areas of interest are consumerism, childhood, clothing and identity, food, tourism, death and funerary rites, myth and folklore, pop culture, and the material culture of everyday life.

Eric is a prolific scholarly and popular writer. He has published many articles and essays, and delivered scores of conference presentations. He is the author of Masculinity, Motherhood and Mockery (2001), From Abraham to America: A History of Jewish Circumcision (2006), A Cultural History of Jewish Dress (2013), and, as editor with David Lipset, Mortuary Dialogues: Death Ritual and the Reproduction of Moral Community in Pacific Modernities (2016). Currently, Eric is writing his fifth book, From Totems to Tourists: Sepik River Art in a Postmodern World. He is also studying contemporary American Jewish fathering, the use of Facebook in Papua New Guinea, and the Grateful Dead.

Locally, Eric has served as an elected member of the Framingham School Board, and he often writes editorial columns for Boston-area online and print news media.

== Education ==
Silverman obtained his BA in anthropology in 1984 from Brandeis University, his MA in anthropology in 1987 from the University of Minnesota, and his PhD in anthropology in 1993, also from the University of Minnesota.
