= Transfiguration Monastery, Bulgaria =

Eastern Orthodox monastery by the Yantra River

Coordinates: 43°7′2″N 25°36′26″E

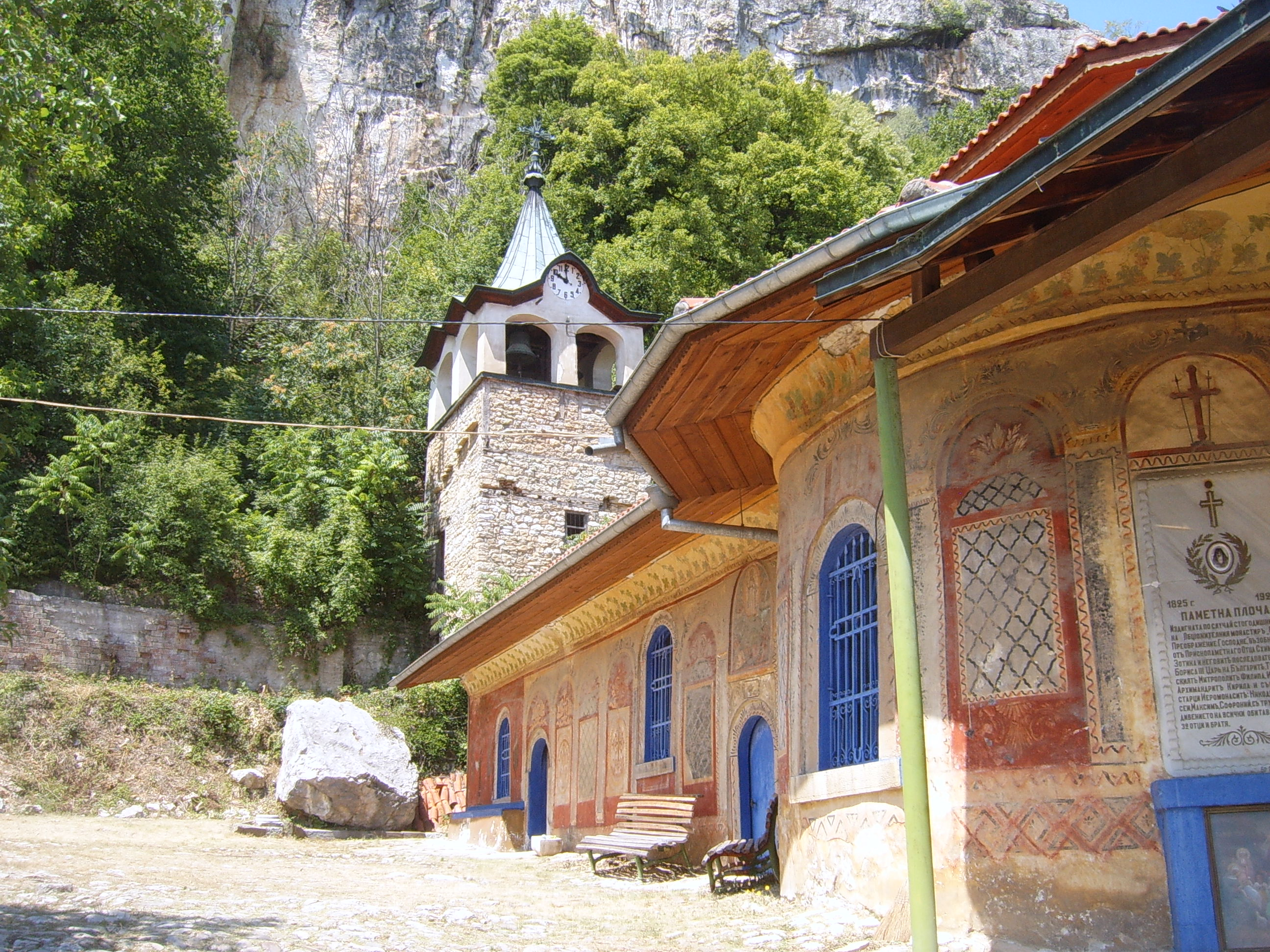
The Transfiguration Monastery

The Transfiguration Monastery (Bulgarian: Преображенски манастир, Preobrazhenski manastir) or the Monastery of the Holy Transfiguration of God (манастир "Свето Преображение Господне", manastir "Sveto Preobrazhenie Gospodne") is an Eastern Orthodox monastery located in the Dervent gorge of the Yantra River. It lies near the village of Samovodene, seven kilometres north of Veliko Tarnovo, in central northern Bulgaria. It is one of the five stauropegic monasteries of the Bulgarian Orthodox Church.

It is thought that the monastery was founded in the 11th century AD as a cloister of the Vatopedi monastery on Mount Athos. In 1360, when Tarnovo was the capital of the Second Bulgarian Empire and the traditions of hesychasm were popular in Bulgaria, it became an autonomous monastery on the order of Tsar Ivan Alexander of Bulgaria. This is legendarily tied to the charity of Ivan Alexander's second wife Sarah-Theodora and their son Ivan Shishman, a reason to also call the monastery Sarah's or Shishman's monastery.

After the Ottoman conquest of Bulgaria, the monastery was plundered and burned several times by the Turks and eventually entirely destroyed. It was only reestablished in 1825 by father Zoticus of the Rila Monastery by means of donations. In 1832, a firman of the Ottoman sultan allowed the construction of a new monastery church; the church was designed by the noted Bulgarian National Revival architect Kolyu Ficheto and completed in 1834. The cross-shaped church features three apses, a single dome and a covered narthex. The icons and frescoes of the main church were painted by another artist, Zahari Zograf, who worked in the monastery between 1849 and 1851, after he finished his decoration of the Troyan Monastery. Among the more notable murals are those of the Last Judgment, the Wheel of Life, the Birth of the Mother of God, the Last Supper. Zograf also painted Saints Cyril and Methodius, as well as a self-portrait. In addition, the main church was richly decorated on the outside and a wood-carved and gold-plated iconostasis was installed.

Between 1858 and 1863 Kolyu Ficheto constructed the seven-bell belfry, the residential buildings and the main entrance, as well as the underground chapel of Saint Andrew the First-called and the small Church of the Annunciation on top of it, with icons by Zahari Zograf's nephew Stanislav Dospevski.

== Gallery ==
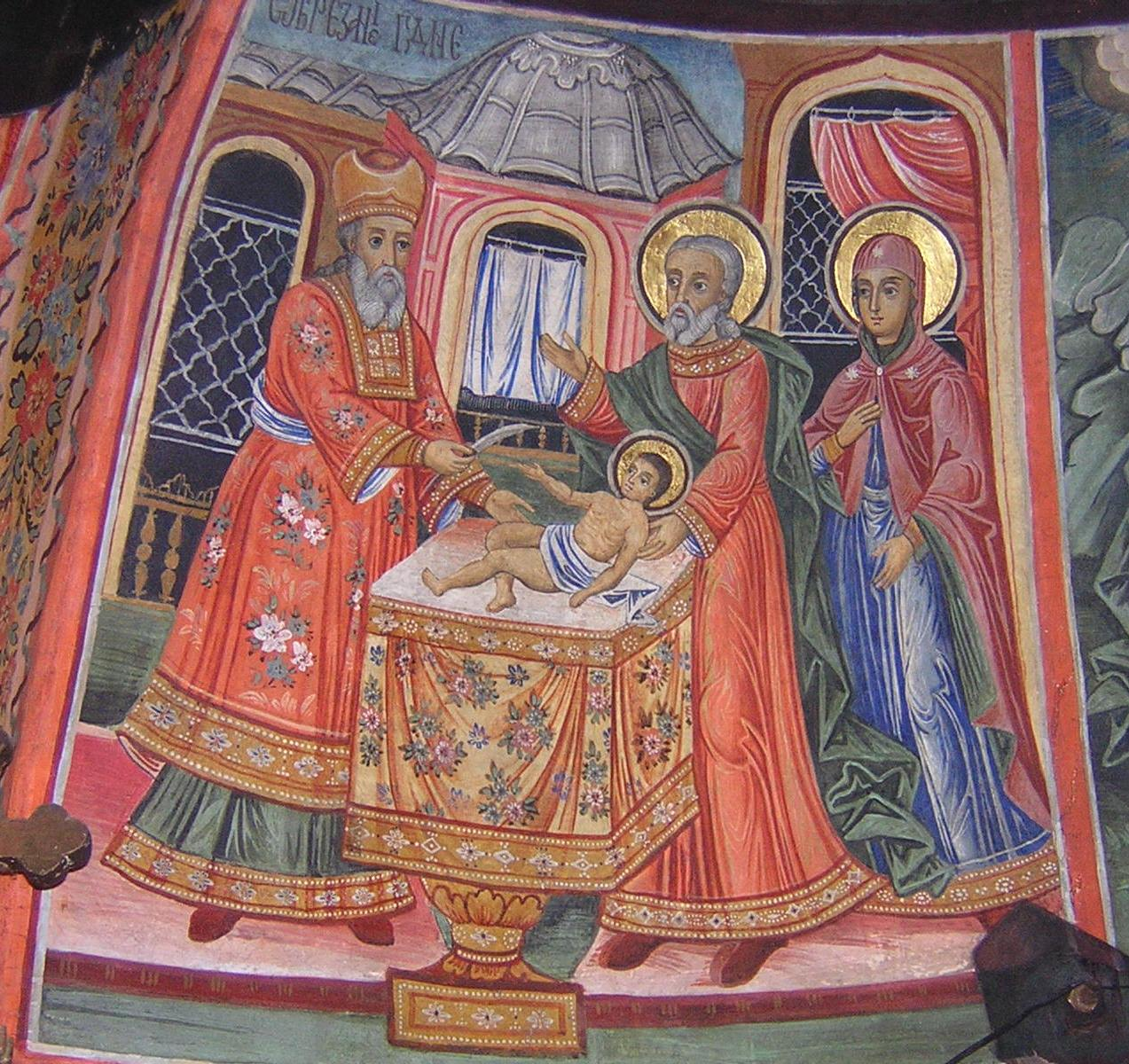
Circumcision of Christ

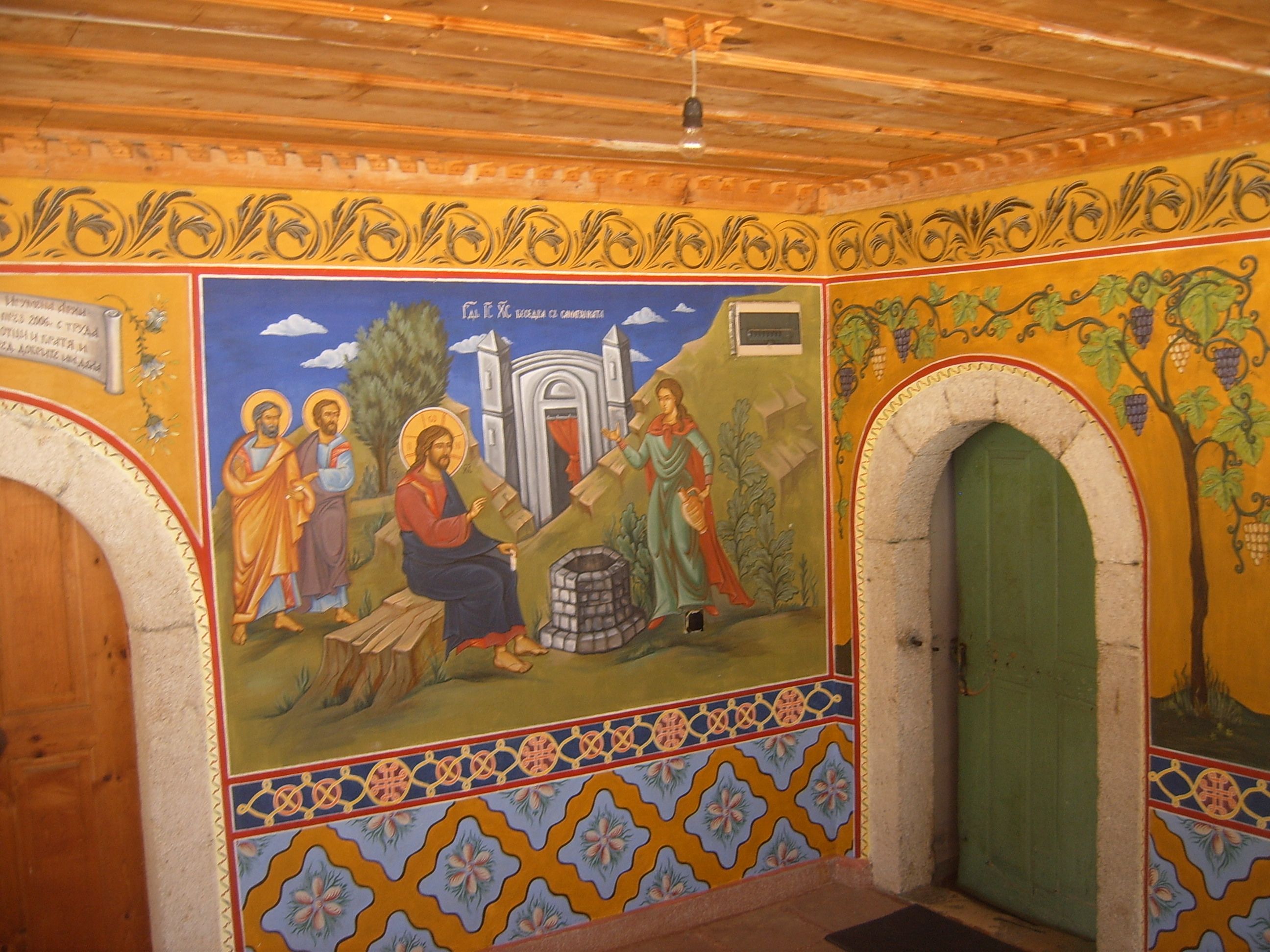
Interior view

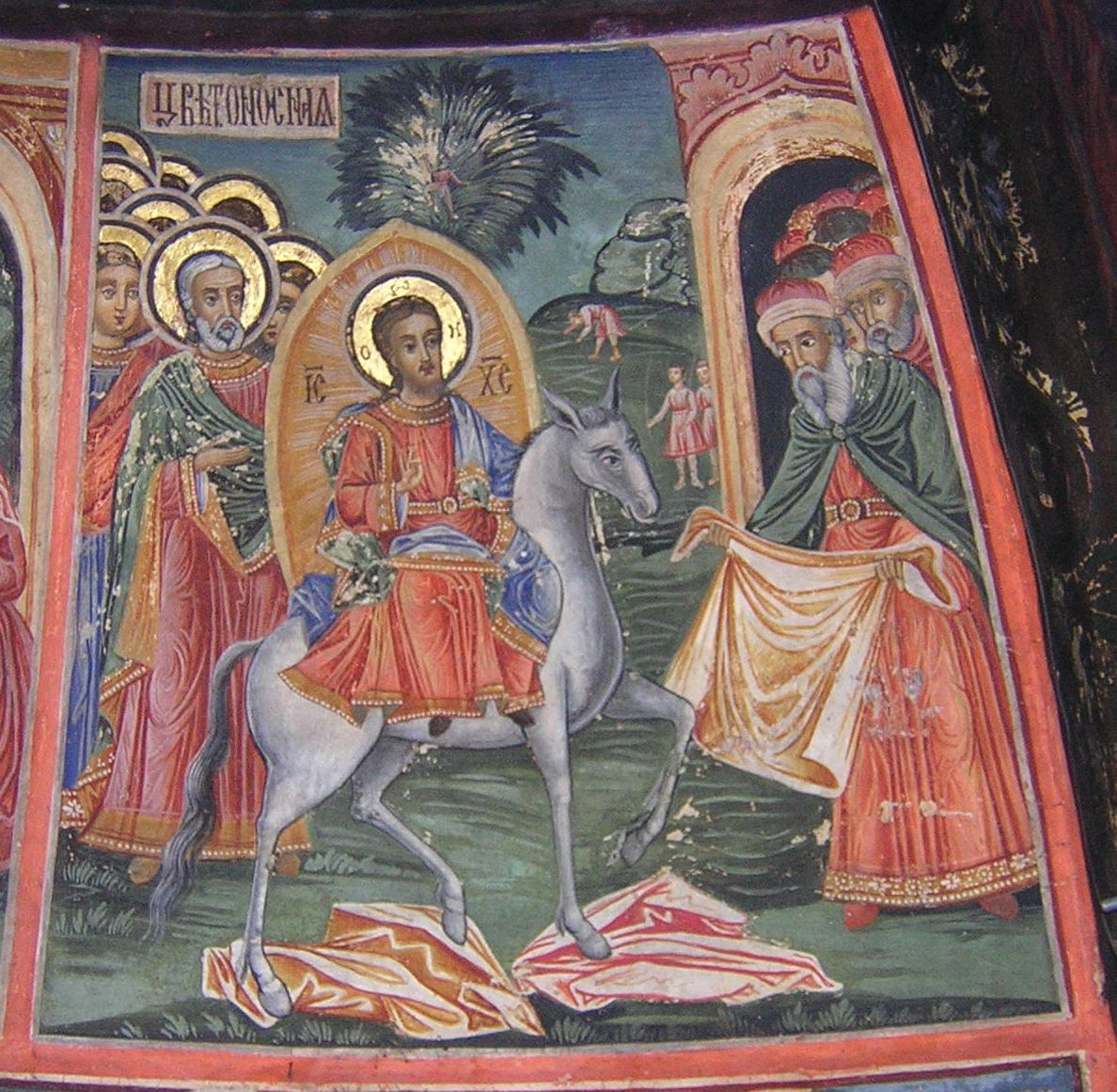
Palm Sunday

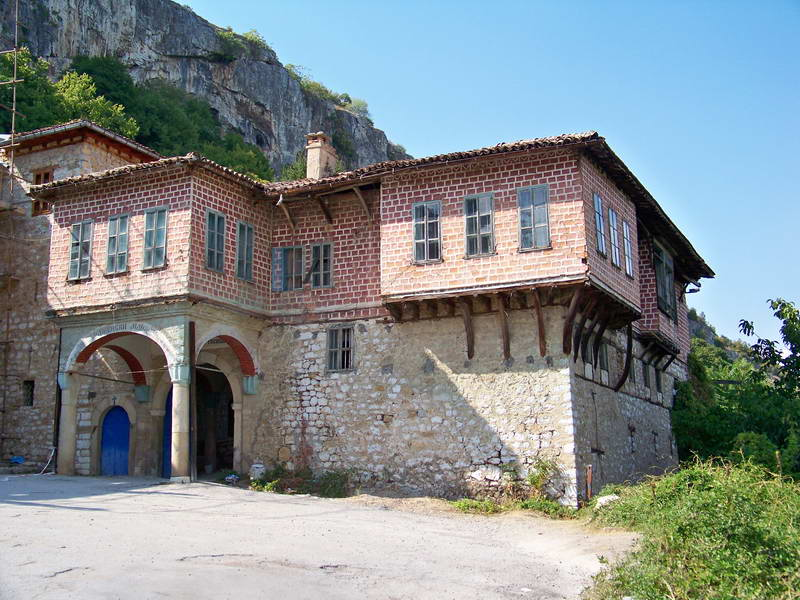

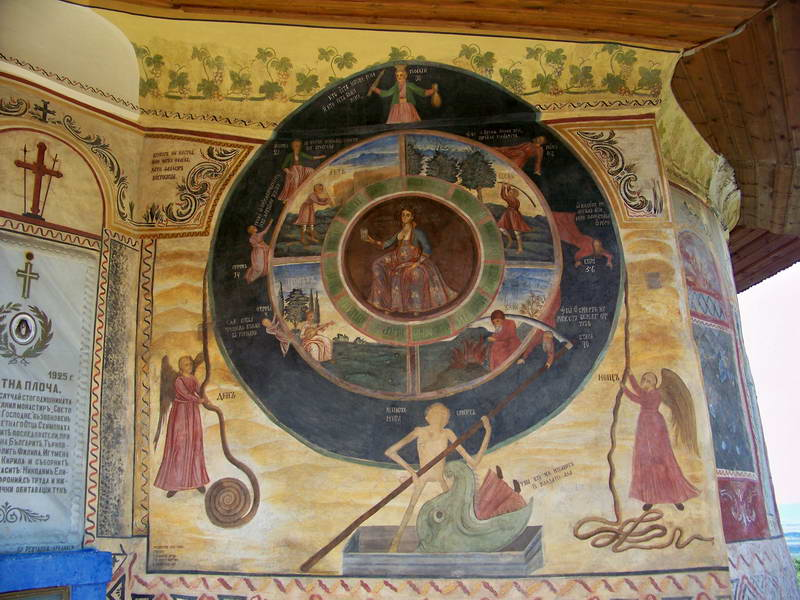

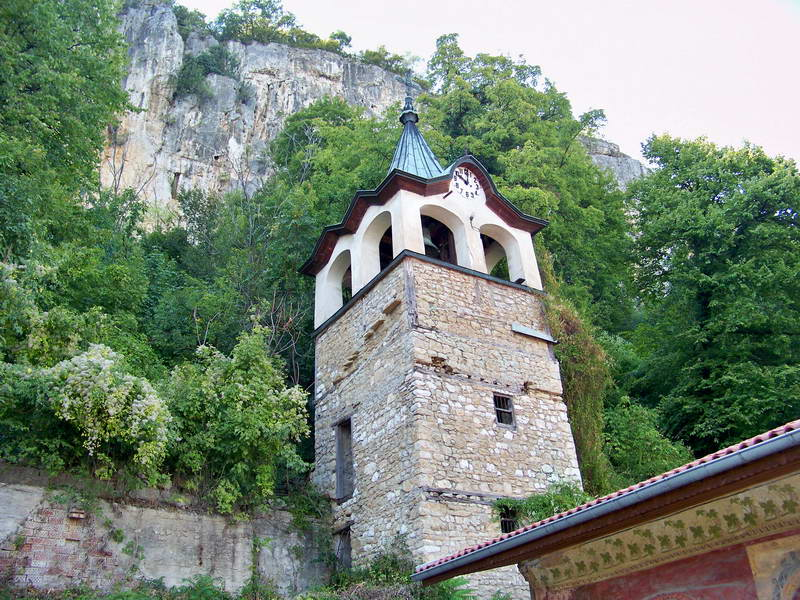

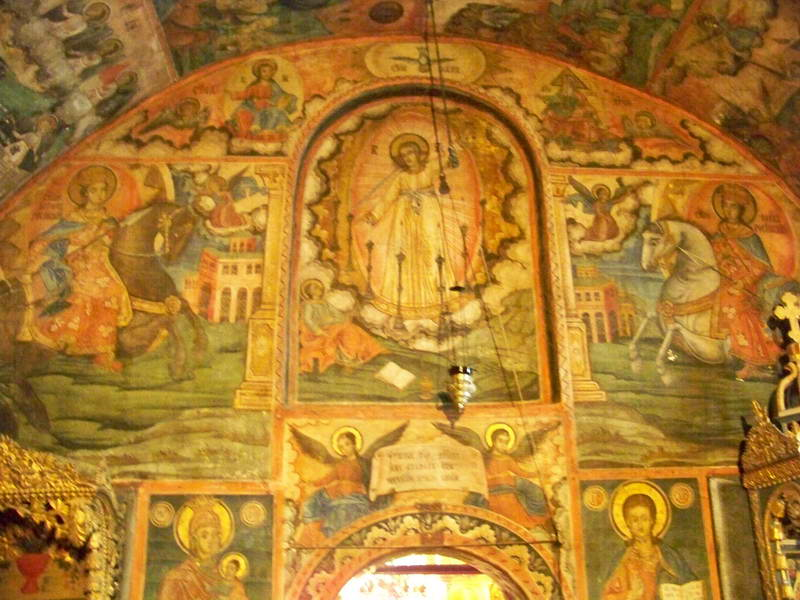

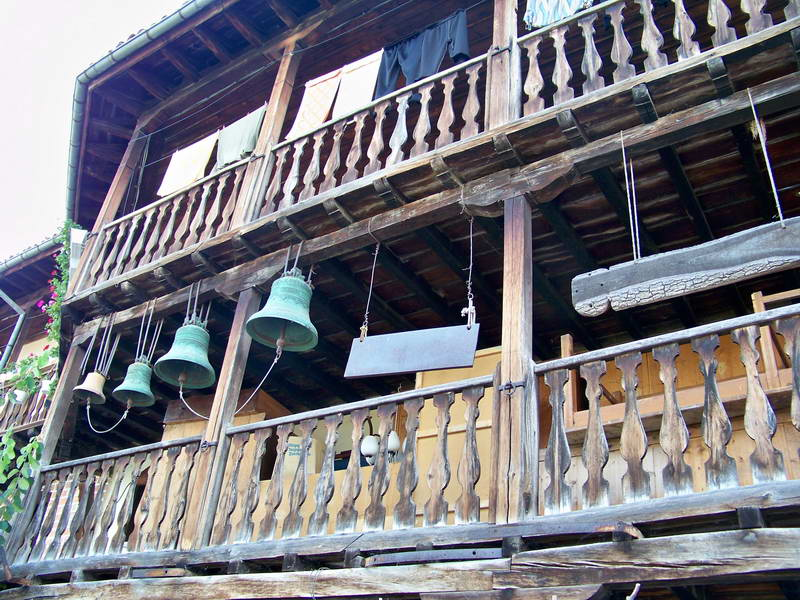

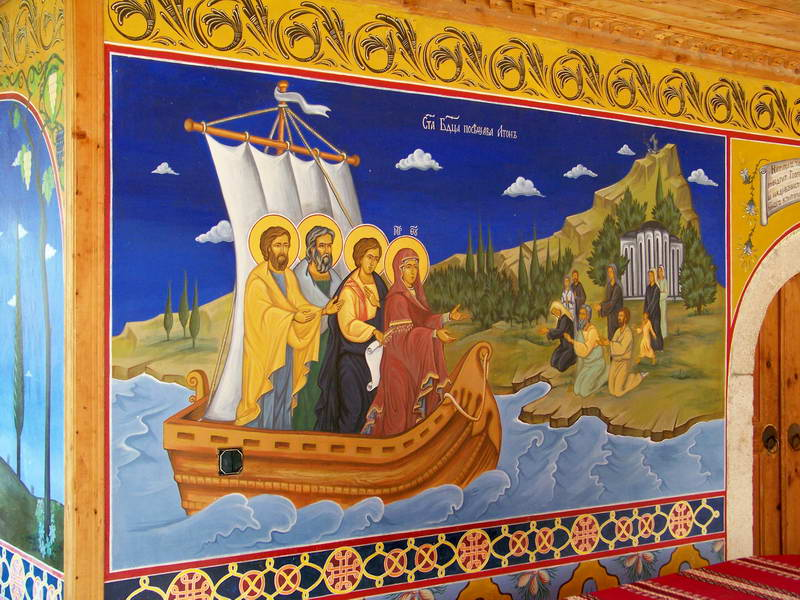

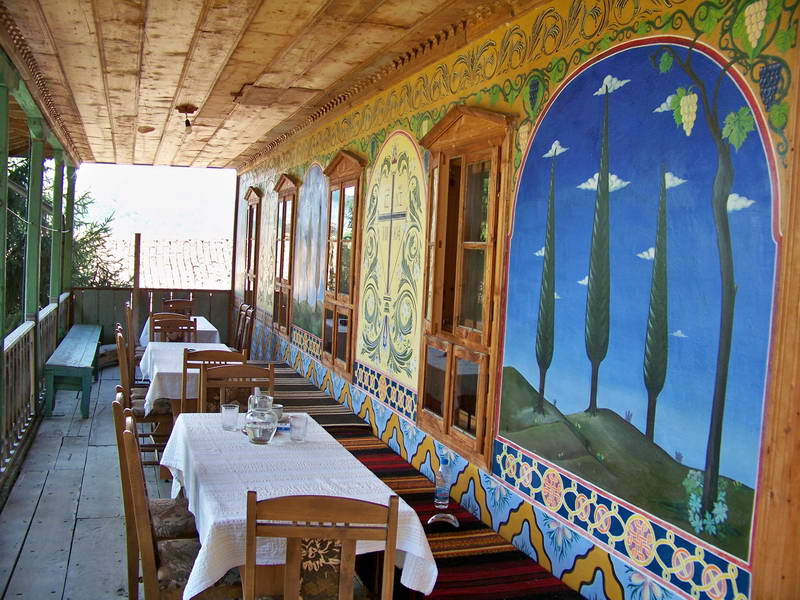

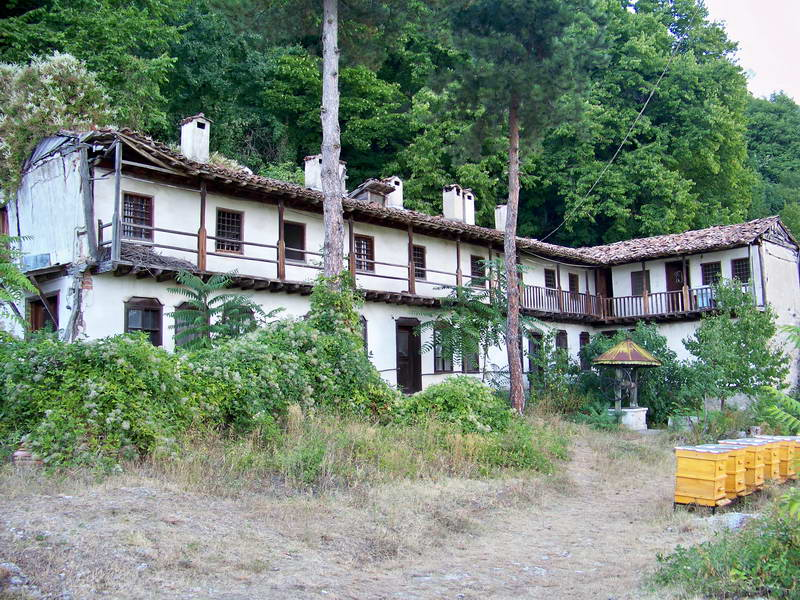
