= Zahari Zograf =

Bulgarian painter (1810–1853)

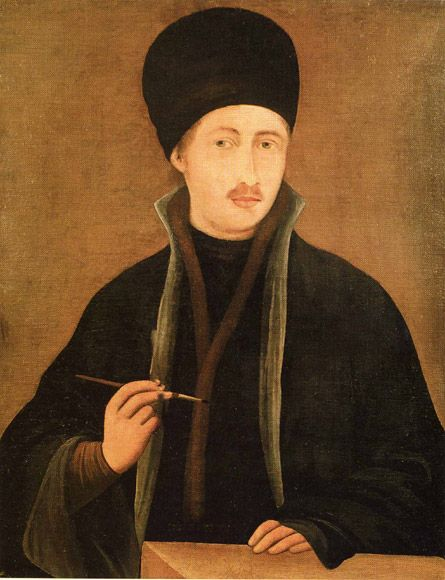
One of the mural self-portraits of Zahari Zograf, National Art Gallery, Sofia

Zahariy Hristovich Dimitrov (Bulgarian: Захарий Христович Димитров) (1810–1853), better known as Zahari Zograf (or Zahariy Zograf; Захари(й) Зограф) is a famous Bulgarian painter of the Bulgarian National Revival, noted for his church mural paintings and depictions of icons. He is often regarded as the founder of secular art in Bulgaria due to the introduction of everyday life elements in his work.

Zahari Zograf was born in the town of Samokov in 1810 and was taught by his brother Dimitar Zograf, with whom he later worked together, as his father died early. A spiritual student of Neophyte of Rila since 1827, he became an equal partner of his brother at the age of 21 in 1831, i.e. he was proclaimed a master.

His best known icons are those of the SS Constantine and Helen Church in Plovdiv, the Church of the Theotokos in Koprivshtitsa, as well as a number of monasteries. Zahari Zograf's best known frescoes are those in the main church of the Rila Monastery, in the chapel and the St Nicholas church of the Bachkovo Monastery, the Troyan Monastery and the Monastery of the Transfiguration. He painted three mural portraits of himself in the latter three, a move that was regarded as controversial during the time.

Zahari Zograf lived and worked on Mount Athos between 1851 and 1852, where he decorated the outer narthex of the Great Lavra. He also did several church donor portraits in his later years, also leaving a large number of unrealized sketches after his death from typhus on 14 June 1853.

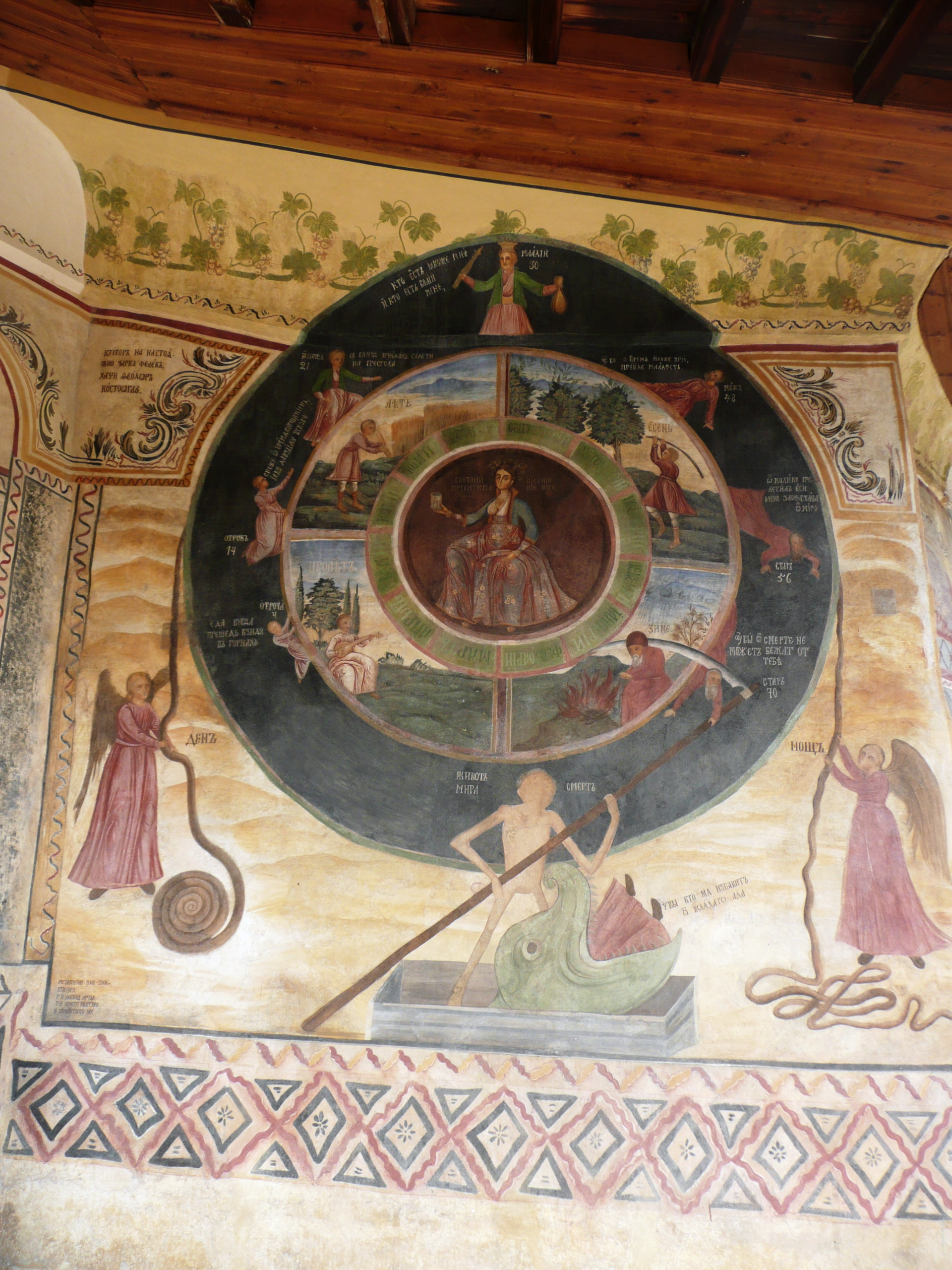
The circle of life, Transfiguration Monastery, Veliko Tarnovo

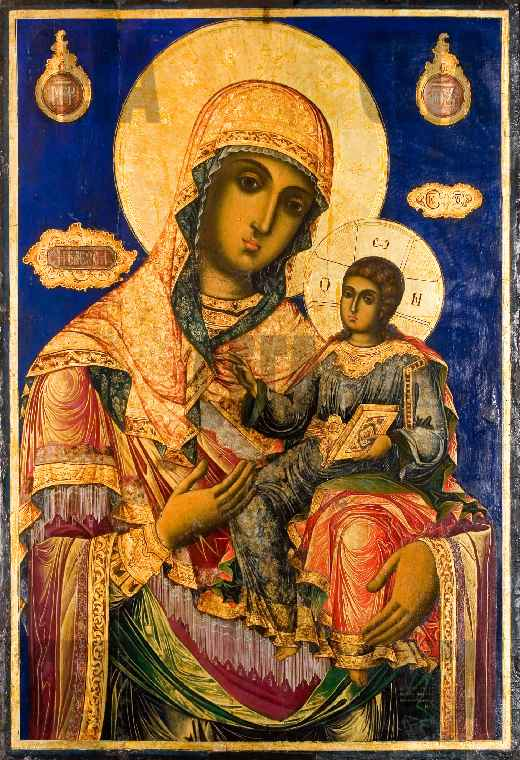
Mary with the young Jesus, church Archangel, Bachkovo Monastery

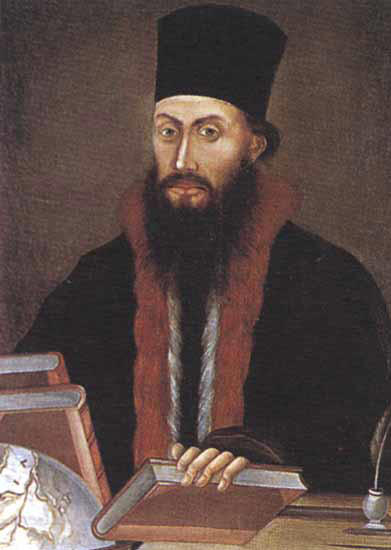
Рortrait of Neofit Rilski (1838), National Art Gallery, Sofia

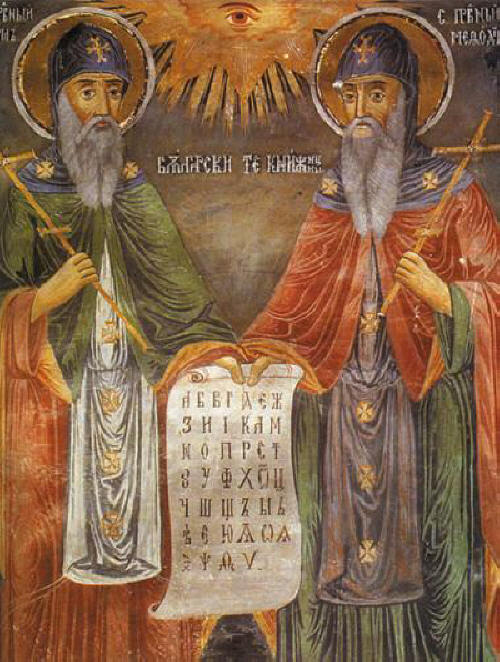
Saints Cyril and Methodius (1848), Troyan Monastery
