= Ledenik =

Ledenik may refer to:

- Ledenik, Bulgaria, a village near Veliko Tarnovo
- Ledenik, Croatia, a village near Koška
- Ledenik Cesarički, a village near Karlobag, Croatia
- Ledenik, Kosovo, a village near Češanoviće, Zubin Potok, Kosovo
