= Tower of Ledenik =

Coordinates: 43.0787°N 25.5384°E

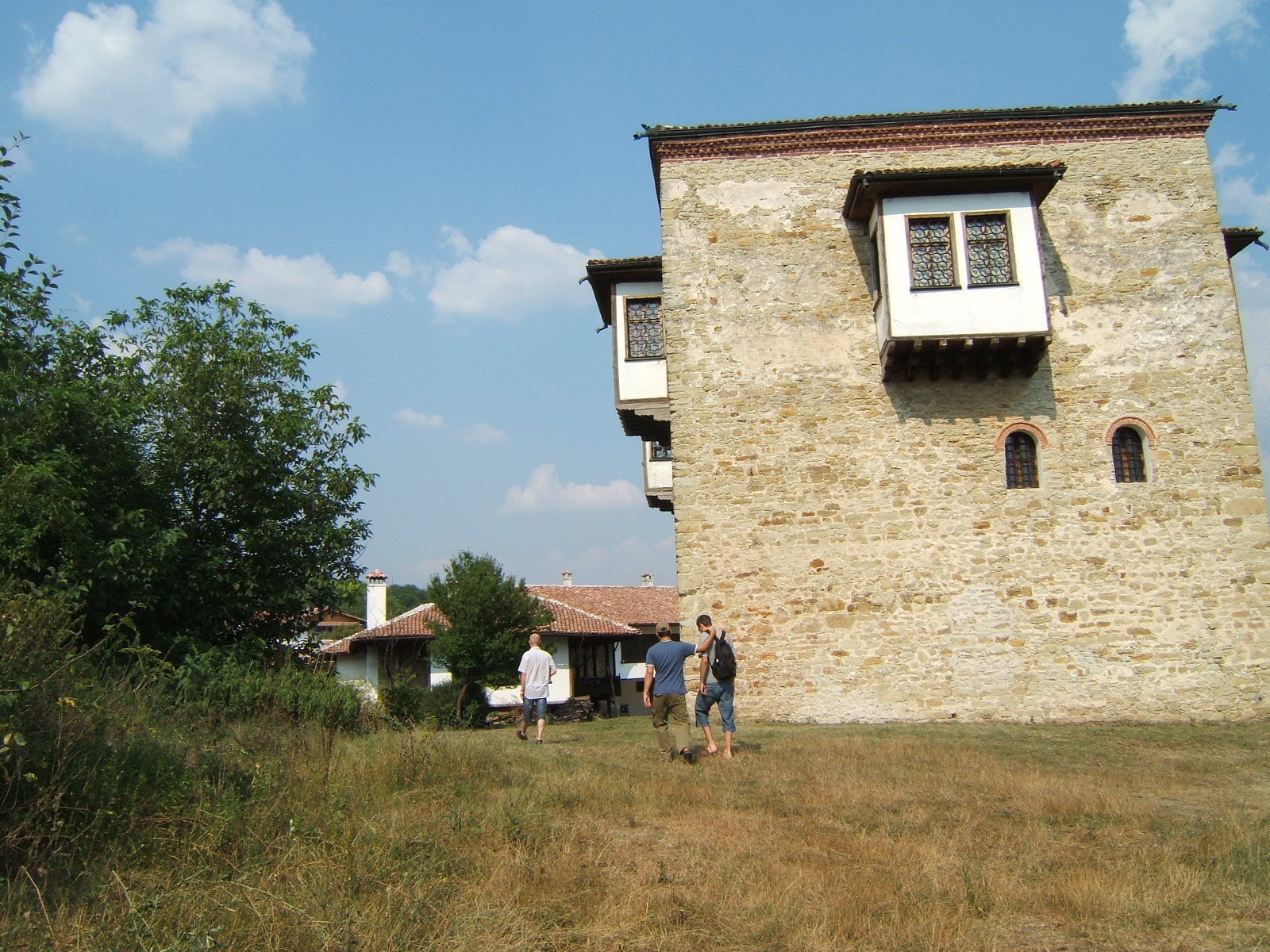
Shemshi Bay's Tower

The tower of Ledenik, also known as Shemshi Bay's Tower or the Bey Tower, is an ancient building from the XVII century, the biggest landmark in the village of Ledenik, Veliko Tarnovo municipality.

== Description ==
Located at the western end of the village, the tower of Ledenik is rising on the rocky hill named Mela (or Myasla), which is cut as a peninsula in the riverbed of Yantra.

It is believed that a fortification was built on the place as early as the IV century AD, against the Huns' invasions. The first data about the building come from the year 1650, when it was restored for living by the local governor and the name Shemshi Bey is mentioned. Folklore tales speak of Shemshi Bey (Ottoman viceroy in Tarnovo), who inherited land and built on it a magnificent for its time saray. To this day, the rumor persists about the luxury with which the Bay home was furnished.

The building is considered to be the tallest residential building on the Balkans, built entirely of stone. Until the Liberation of Bulgaria from Ottoman rule, it was burned twice by Bulgarian hajduks.

The only restoration before XXI century was done in 1969, after which the roof was repaired in 2013. A restaurant and a small hotel have been built near the tower, which today receive guests again. The tower itself is an ethnographic museum on 3 floors.

There are no windows on the first floor, only a front door with a solid wooden gate with traces of bullets from the April Uprising. The ethnographic exposition is located in the former 2 cellars, where you can see tools for outdoor work - plow, threshers, beehives, etc., and indoor work - spindle, loom and others. Folk costumes and household items are also on display.

On the second floor, with several windows, are the bedroom of Shemshi Bay and several guest rooms. In the bedroom there is only the huge bed of the bay (3 times larger than a modern bedroom for 2 people), occupying almost the entire room - from one end to the other. It can be reached through another room, decorated with typical Arabic motifs according to the traditions of the Arabic style. The bedroom is also used for overnight stays by tourists.

On the third floor there are 9 covered balconies. There are 2 spacious halls (dining room and living room), richly decorated with kiteniкs (decorative woolen rugs) and wood carvings.

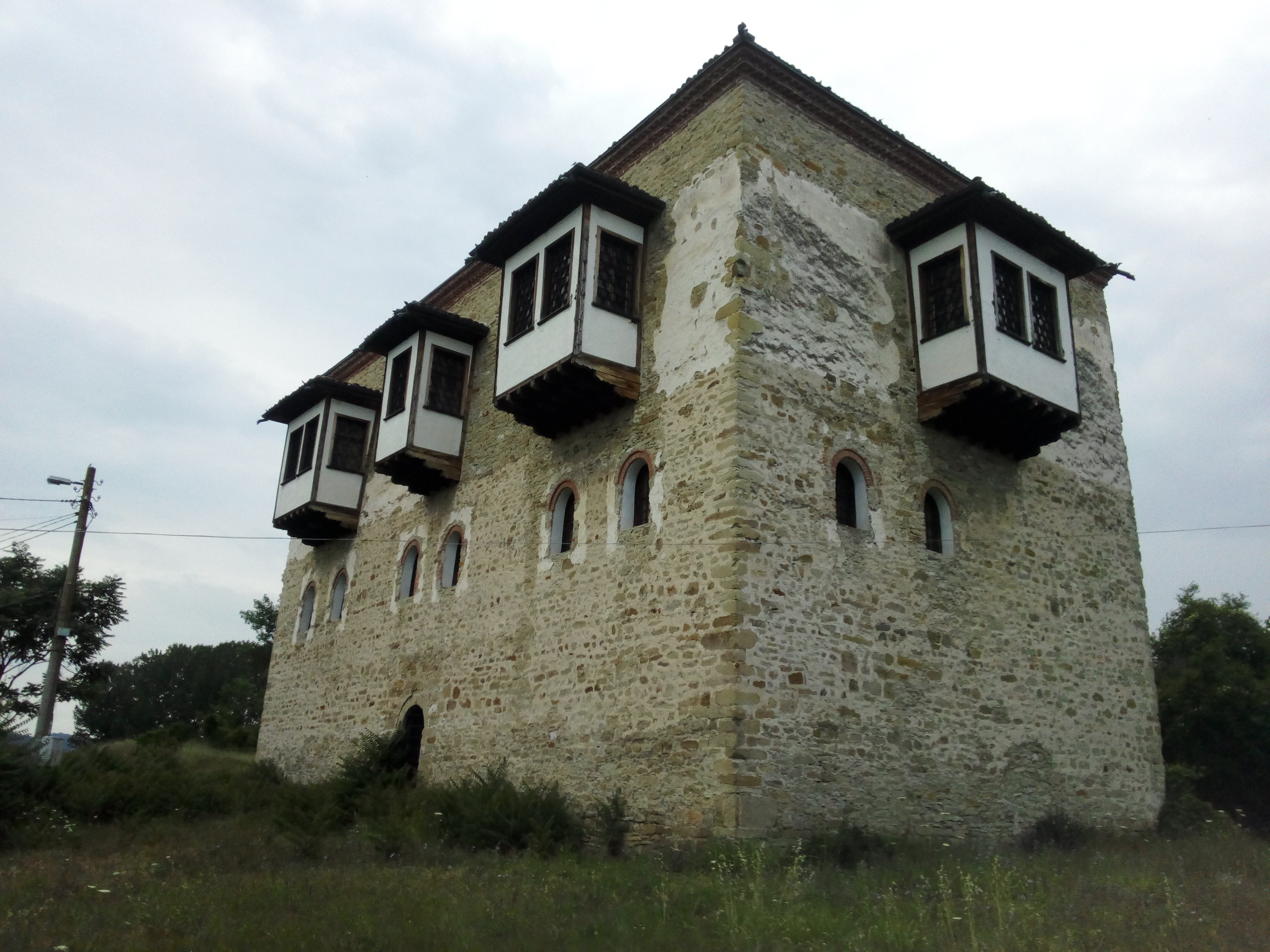

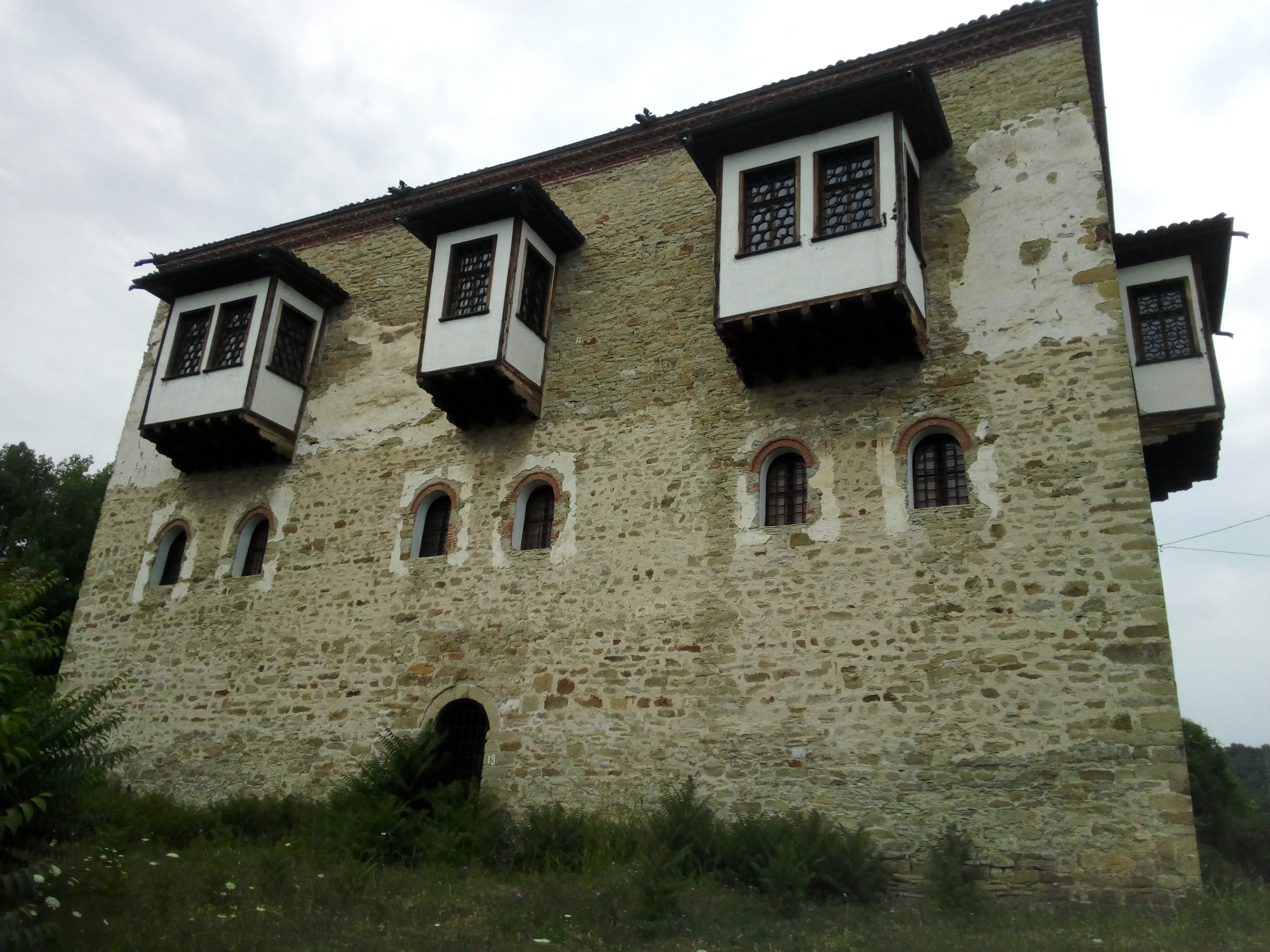

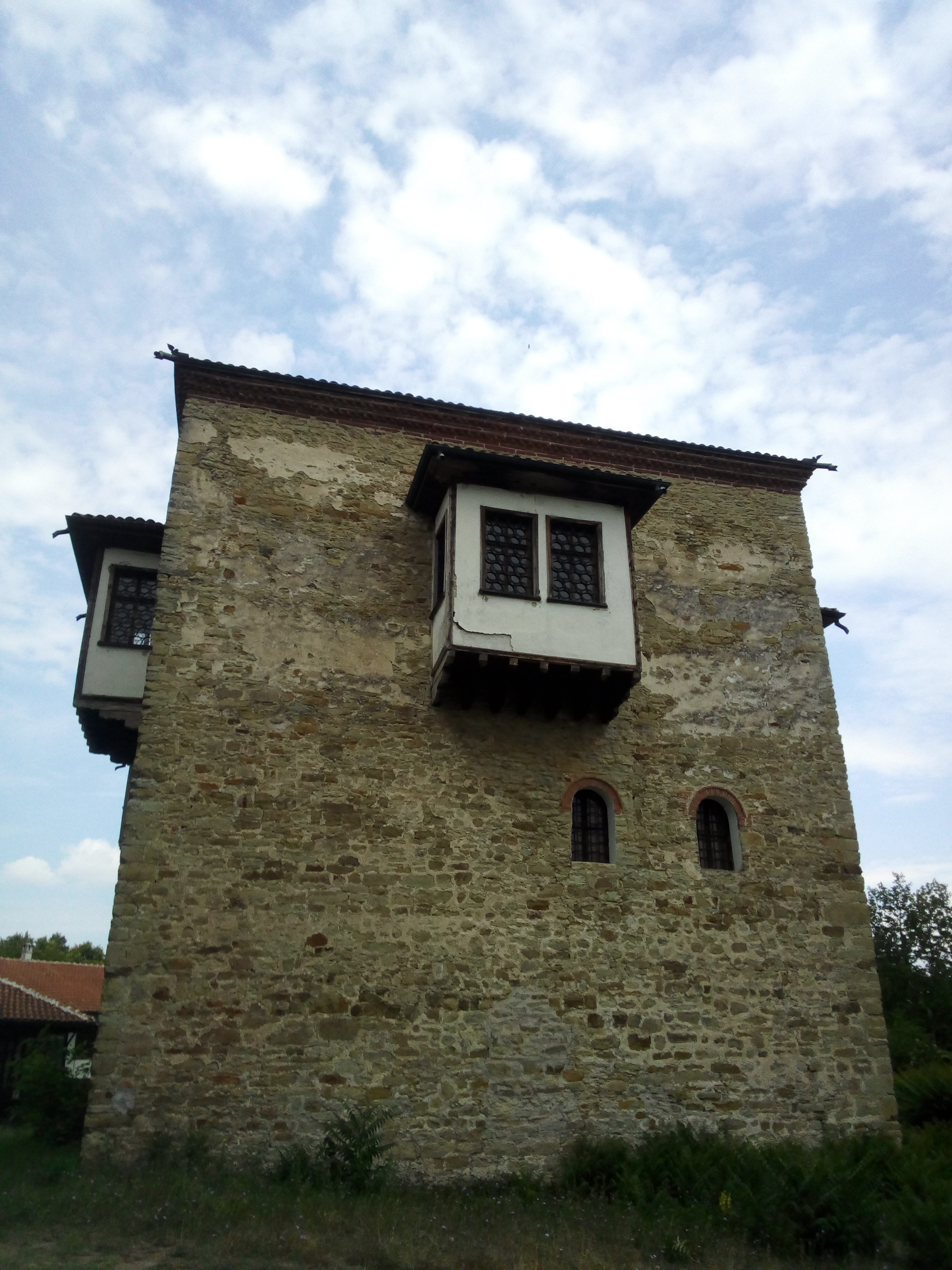

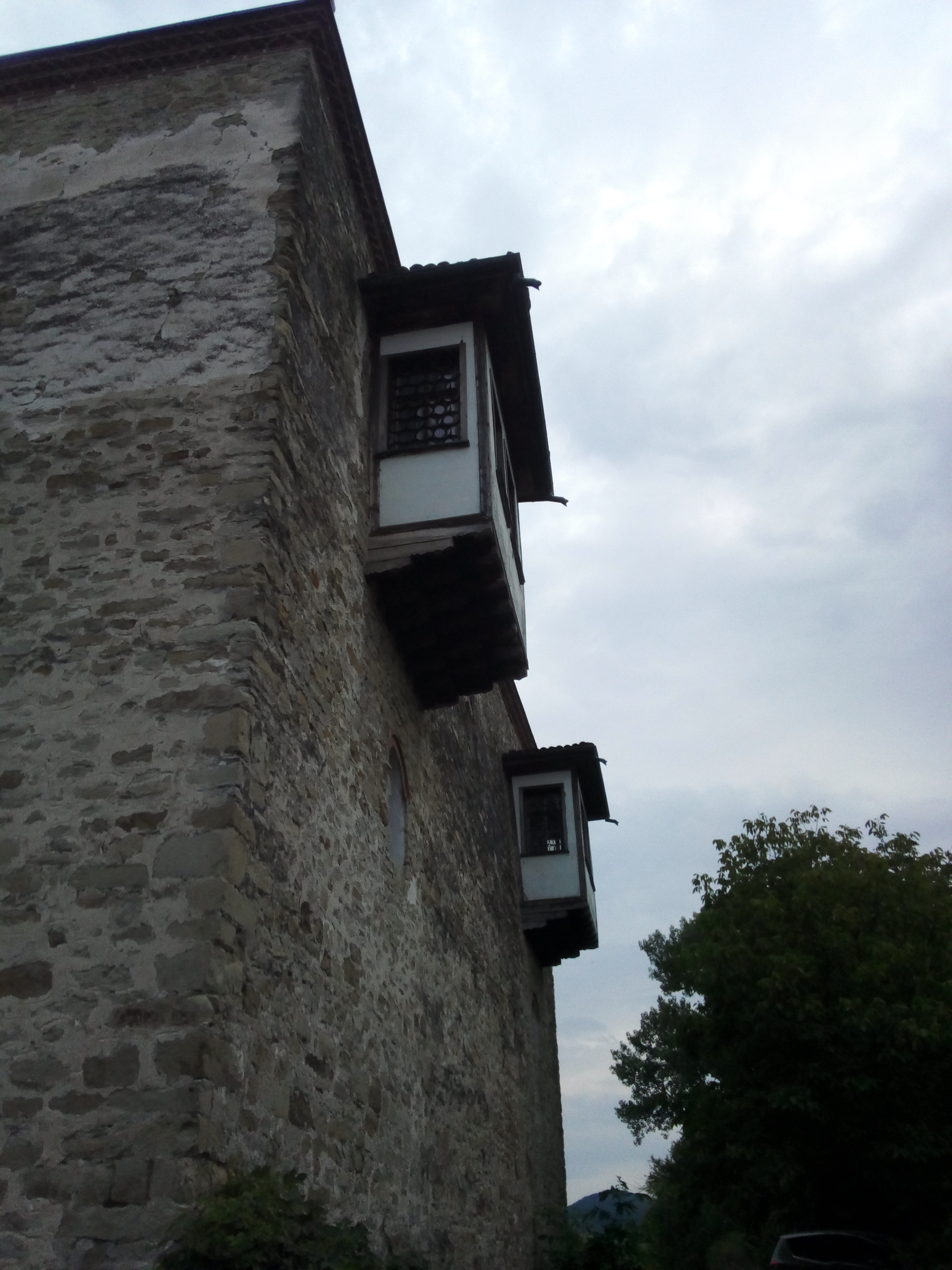

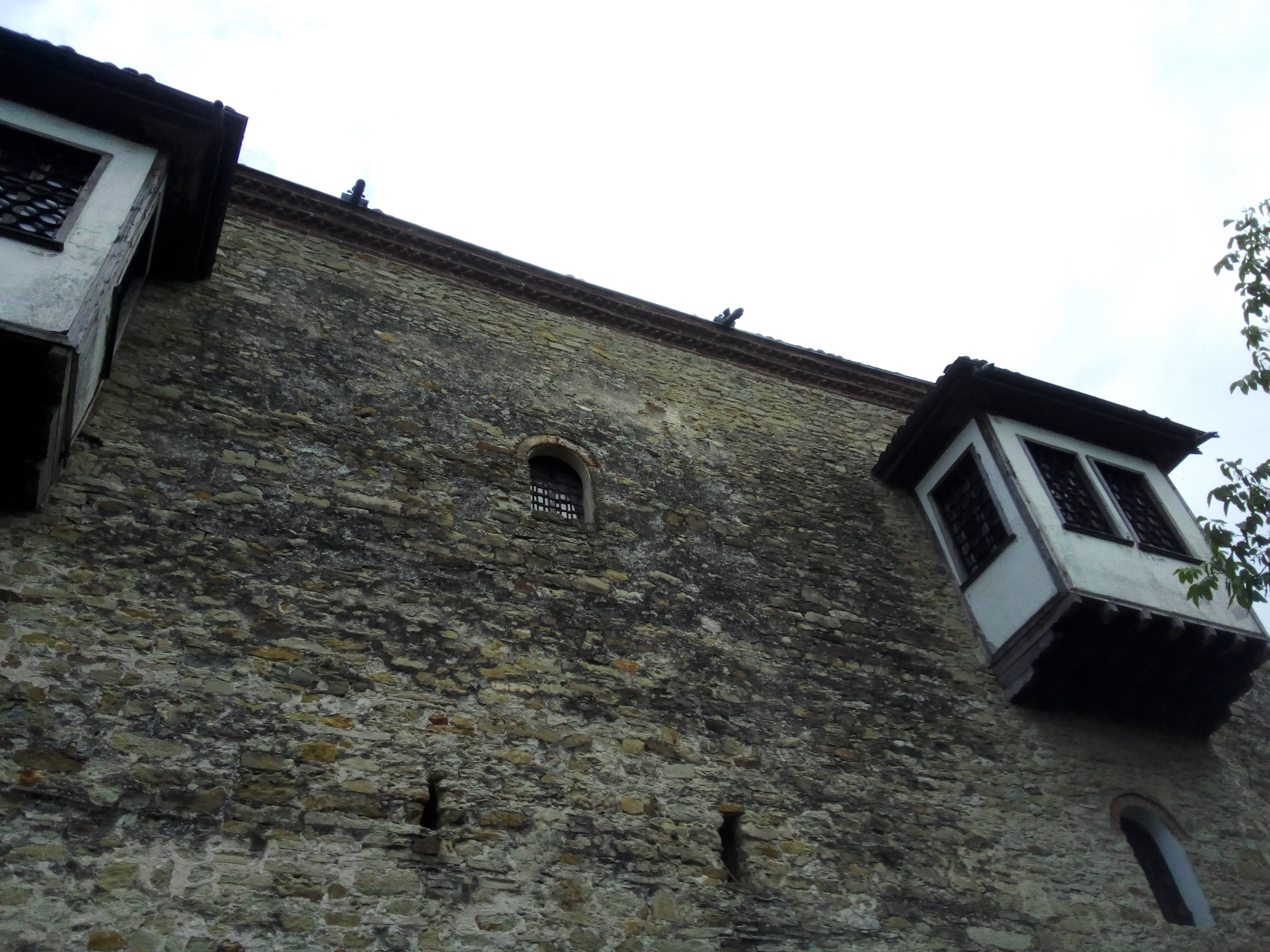

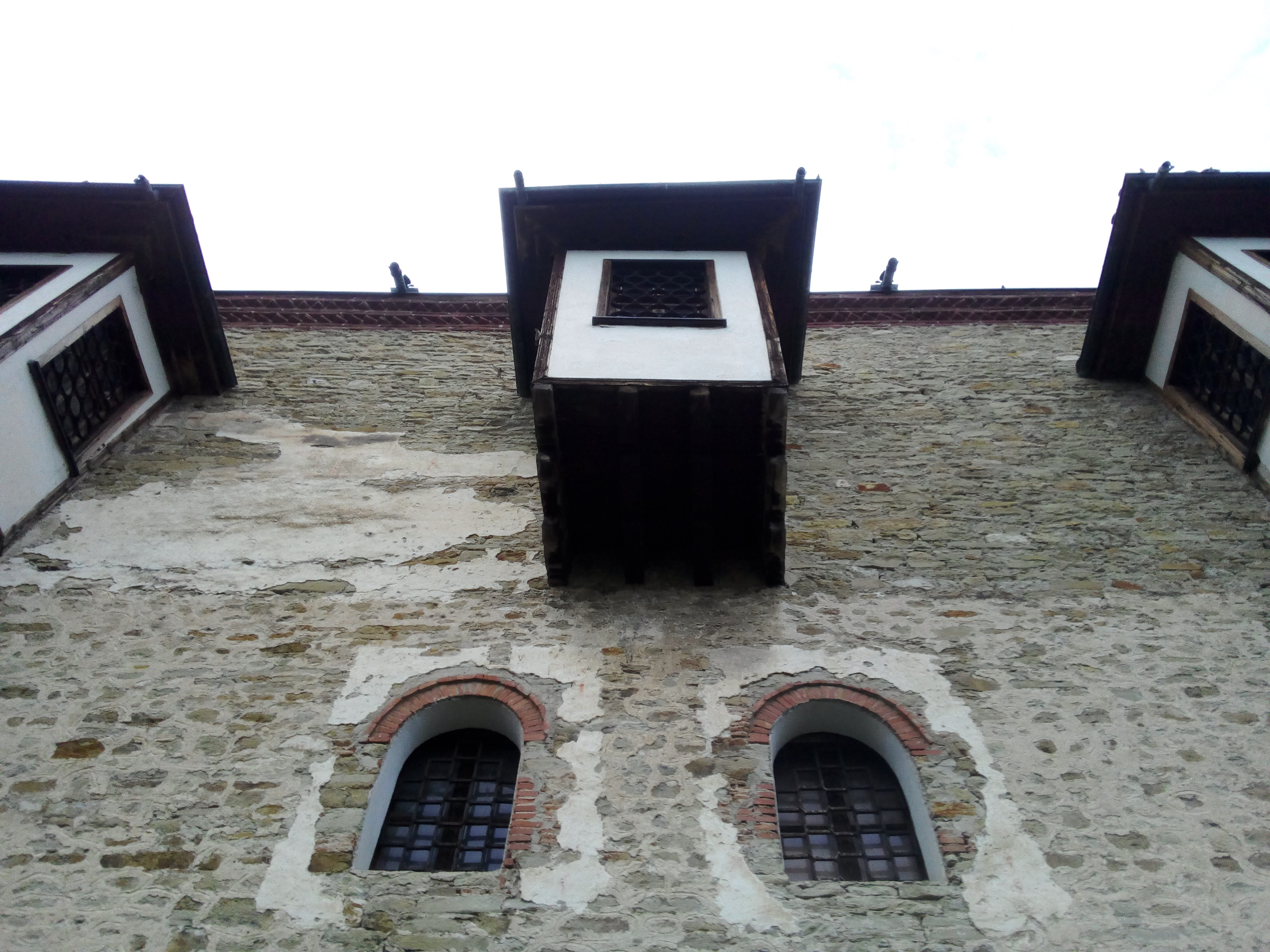

== Legends ==
The tower is associated with several legends - about the destructive love of the bey's son, about кirdzhalis robbers in the tower, as well as about the tower itself.

=== Neda and the Bay's son ===
Legend has it that the bey's only son fell in love with the beautiful Bulgarian maiden Neda from the neighboring village Shemshevo across the river. The sorceress Mina gave the girl an herb potion that put the girl to sleep so deeply that she looked like dead. The Bay son went to her house and after seeing his beloved in a coffin, shot himself in the heart. The bey, mourning the death of his son, gave money to Neda's parents to bury their daughter.

Late in the evening, the already awoken Neda and her brother, secretly headed to Tarnovo, but a man from Ledenik saw them and the rumor about the resurrected girl spread. She reached the ears of the bey, who, overwhelmed with suspicion, ordered that the girl's grave be dug up. The coffin was full of stones and the fraud was discovered. All the girl's relatives as well as the herbalist Mina were slaughtered on Asha Chair.

Learning of the tragedy that befell his family, Neda's brother gathered a party and attacked the bey's retinue. The boy failed to reach the bey, who moved to Tarnovo out of fear. This is the story of the last bay to inhabit the building. Since then, people from Ledenik have started calling the building "The Tower".

According to another version, the Bay son jumped from the so-called Rock of Lovers, located 50 meters from the tower. Upon learning of his death, Neda, who was in love with him, also jumped off the cliff.

=== Kirdzhalis and hajduks ===
During the time of the Kirdzhali a horde attacked the village of Dryanovo - the thugs raped women, set fire to houses, robbed and killed. Uzun Petko voivoda gathered a cheta and chased them to the tower, where they hid. Uzun Petko called for help his fellow Mircho voivoda and besieged the building. However, having no success they changed tactics and set hay on fire around the building to get the Kirdzhali out. They ran out, one by one and the hajduks ambushed and killed them.
