= Ledenik, Bulgaria =

Ledenik Леденик
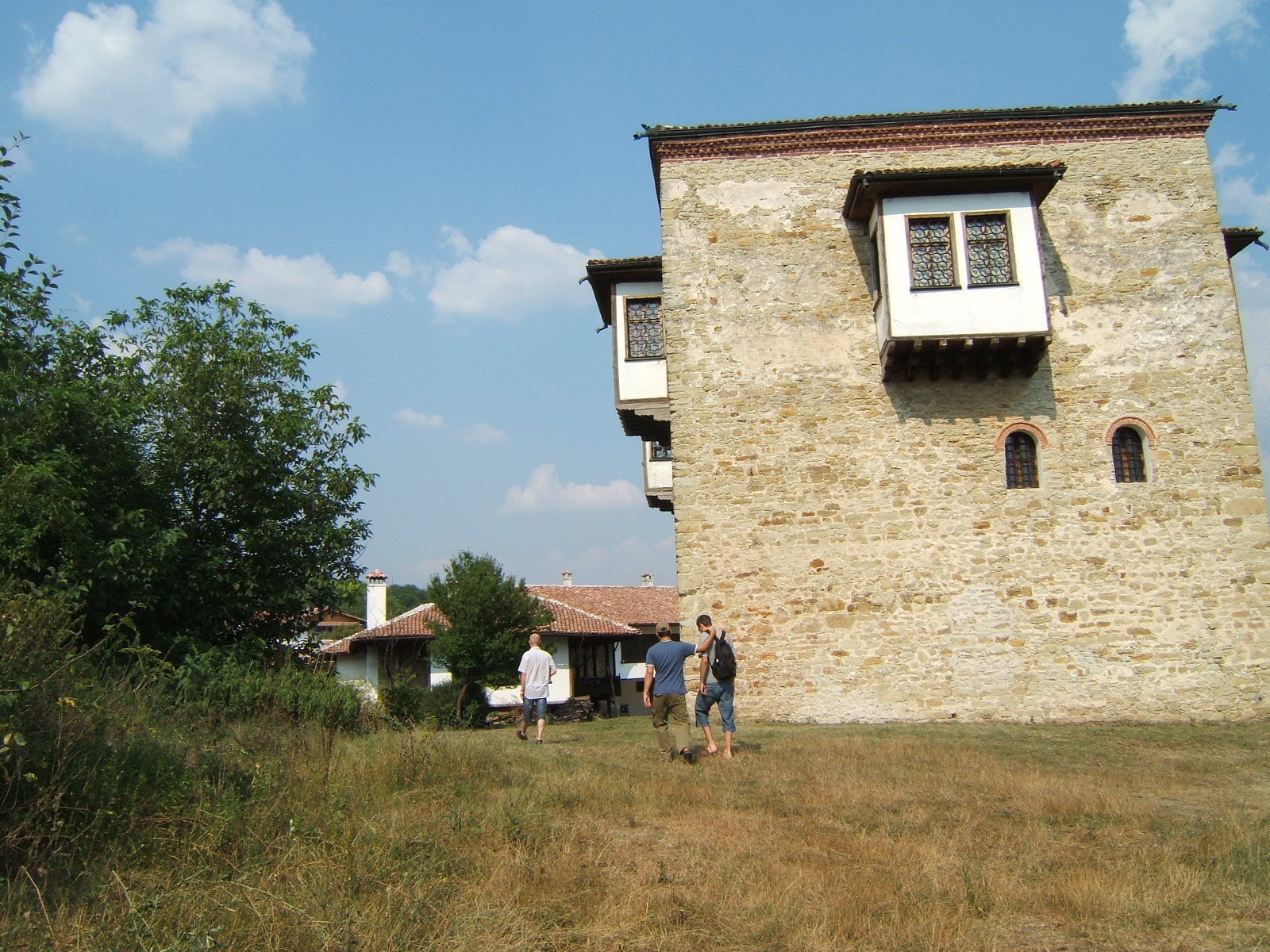
- The tower of Shemshi Bey, Ledenik village

- Location within Bulgaria
- Coordinates: 43°04′52″N 25°32′47″E
- Country: Bulgaria

Area
  - Total: 22,619 km^{2} (8,733 sq mi)
- Elevation: 171 m (561 ft)
- Time zone: UTC+2 (EET)
  - Summer (DST): UTC+3 (EEST)
- Postal code: 5049
- Area code: 062

Ledenik is a village in Central North Bulgaria, in the Veliko Tarnovo Municipality, Veliko Tarnovo Province - near the municipal city of Veliko Tarnovo. South of the village passes the river Yantra. The name of the village comes from the fact that it was famous for its ice houses in the past.

== Geography ==
=== Location ===
Ledenik is located in the Veliko Tarnovo municipality, on the left coast of the river Yantra - 7 km west of the old capital Veliko Tarnovo, and 10 km from the architectural reserve Arbanasi. North of the village, in close proximity, is the first class republican road I-4 (Sofia - Veliko Tarnovo - Varna).

- Through Ledenik passes the road to Kereka to the south, passing through Shemshevo, and from there one can reach Dryanovo and Gabrovo. The village of Pushevo can be reached to the west through Shemshevo as well
- To the north the land of the village borders with that of the village of Belyakovets and the village of Momin Sbor
- To the east - with the land of Veliko Tarnovo
- To the south - with the land of Shemshevo
- To the west - with the land of Pushevo

=== Terrain and geology ===
The village of Ledenik falls in the north central part of the Pre-Balkan natural area, part of the structure of the Balkanids. It is located in the transition zone between the lowland (0 - 200 m above sea level) and the flat-hilly belt (200 - 400 m above sea level). The lowest point is 152 m (located in the eastern part of the land) and the highest 350.3 m (located in the northeastern part of the land). Nearby are the Belyakov Heights.

The predominant rocks are sedimentary - mainly sandstone and limestone.

=== Climate, waters, soils ===
The village falls into the zone of temperate-continental climate. Fogs (increased humidity from the Yantra River) and frosts are typical for the cold half of the year. In the warm half of the year unfavorable climatic phenomena are: hail, droughts and torrential rains.

Several streams flow through the village, which flow into the Yantra River. Captured stream provides water for the fountain in the center of the village. A mineral spring was discovered near the river during a drilling to search for deposits of combustible minerals. It has a low constant flow rate. and its water does not freeze in winter.

=== Flora and fauna ===
The predominant soils in the land of the village are gray forest soils, which need fertilizing with potassium fertilizers. There are alluvial meadow soils near the Yantra River.

There are preserved natural vegetation along the Yantra River. To the west of the village there is a small oak forest, which is young and probably anthropogenic. There is also bushy vegetation in the area, mostly in desolate fields.

In the vicinity of the village there are rabbits, foxes, deer, field mice, quails, larks, terns, nightingales, magpies, jays, woodpeckers, blackbirds and others.

== Population ==
Population according to censuses during the years*:

Population in Bulgaria by years of census:

Historical population
Year	1934	1946	1956	1965	1975	1985	1992	2001	2011
Pop.	2,644	2,495	1,912	1,620	1,639	1,393	816	828	823
±%	—	−5.6%	−23.4%	−15.3%	+1.2%	−15.0%	−41.4%	+1.5%	−0.6%

*The annexation of the village of Shemshevo in 1955 and its secession in 1991 should be taken into account.

Ethnic composition Number and share of ethnic groups according to 2011 Census:

	Number	share (in %)
Total	823	100.00
Bulgarians	704	85.54
Turks	81	9.84
Romani	6	0.72
Other	10	1.21
Not self-determined	12	1.45
Not answered	10	1.21

== History ==
=== Antiquity ===
There was a Roman settlement near the modern village, and it is believed that the history of the village located in this area began around 1017. The village is full of stories and traditions.

A Thracian settlement in the "Beli Bryag" locality is registered in the land, and in the "Usoeto" locality 4.5 km south-west there is an early Byzantine fortress noticed by Škorpil.

=== Middle Ages ===
a medieval church was discovered 1 km to the west, on the high terrain with a large slope towards the Yantra River. According to stylistic features from the found fresco fragments, the church dates from the second half of the 12th century. Traces of a settlement around the church have not been found.

According to legend, the village during the Second Bulgarian Kingdom was in the area "Disagite", around a lush spring, now captured as a fountain. It remained there until the first years of Ottoman rule. Sometime in the second half of the 17th century, with the construction of the Bey Tower, it moved to its present location.

=== Ottoman rule ===
In the Turkish tax register from 1430 there is a village called Ledenik, which is recorded as a timar of Sayyaklu Bayazid and has 1 Muslim, 47 Christian families and 2 widows. In 1638 there were 42 Christian men in the village.

=== After the Liberation ===
With an administrative act of 17.12.1955 the village of Shemshevo was annexed to the village of Ledenik. This fact changed on August 26, 1991, when the village of Shemshevo again became an independent settlement.

== Culture ==
=== Legend of Shemshi Bay ===
The legend tells that the only son of the bey fell in love with the beautiful Bulgarian girl Neda. Worried about their daughter's fate, the parents turned to the old witch doctor Mina for advice and she gave the girl an herb that put the girl to sleep so deep that she looked dead.

Not wanting to believe the rumor about the "death" of his beloved, the master's son went to her parents' house. Seeing his beloved оне in a coffin, the young man shot himself in the heart. It was not long before the old bey appeared in the house, mourning the death of his son. Awaiting revenge, the parents accepted the new guest with fear. The wise master not only did not take revenge, but also gave money for their daughter's funeral.

Late in the evening, Neda, who had already woken up, went secretly to Tarnovo, but on leaving the village they were seen by a man from Ledenik and the rumor about the resurrected girl spread through the village and reached the ears of the bey, who, overwhelmed with suspicion, ordered that the girl's grave be dug up. The coffin was full of stones and the deceit was discovered. All of the girl's relatives were slaughtered in the "Asha Chair" locality under the village of Shemshevo.

Learning of the tragedy that befell his family, the brother gathered his party and attacked the bey's retinue. The boy failed to reach his former master, who was scared and decided to move to Tarnovo. This is the story of the last bay to inhabit the building. From that moment on, the Glaciers began to call the building the Tower.

=== Ethnographic Museum ===
The fortified residential Shemshi Bay Tower from 1650 on Mela Hill has been turned into an ethnographic museum.

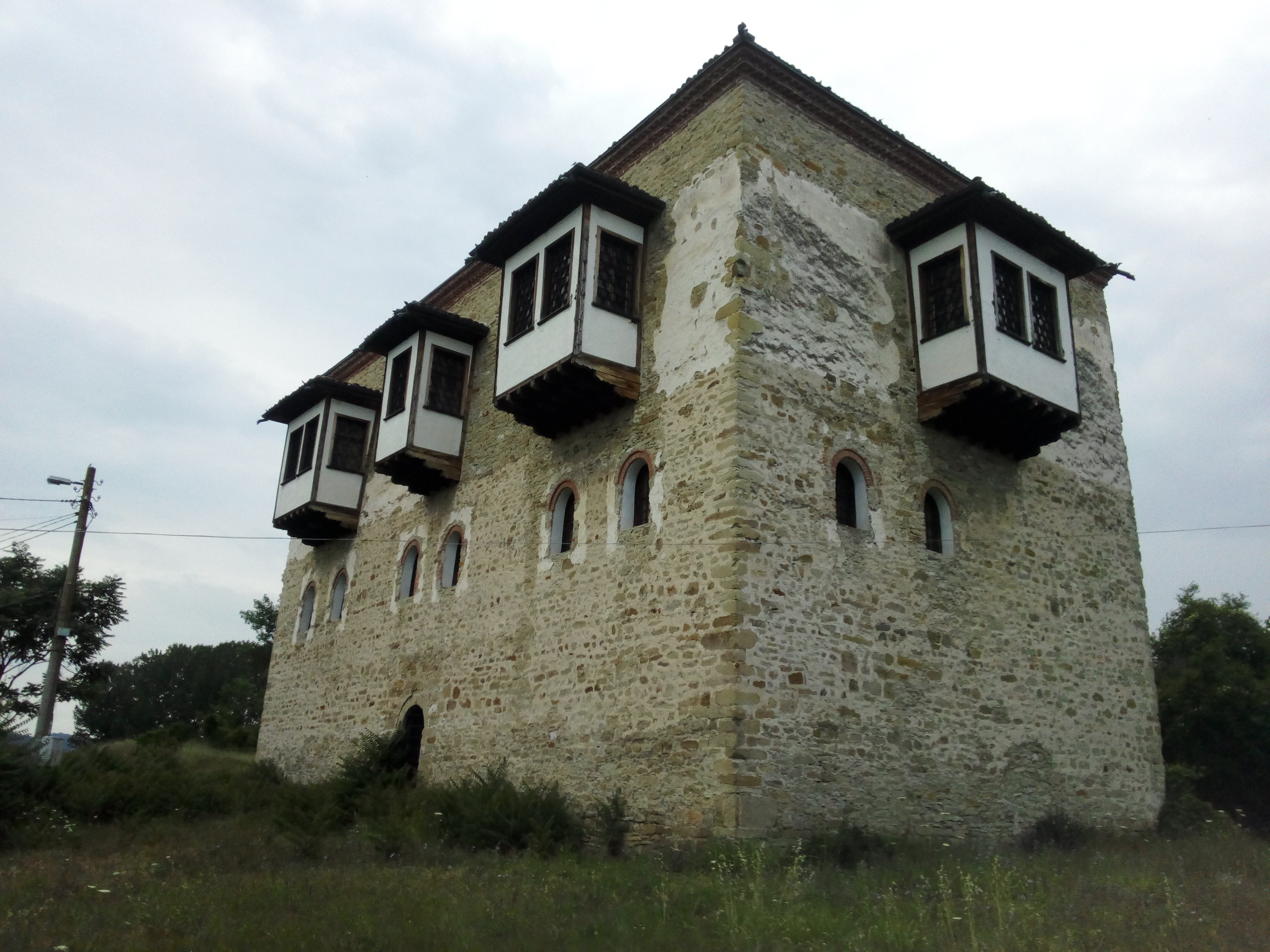

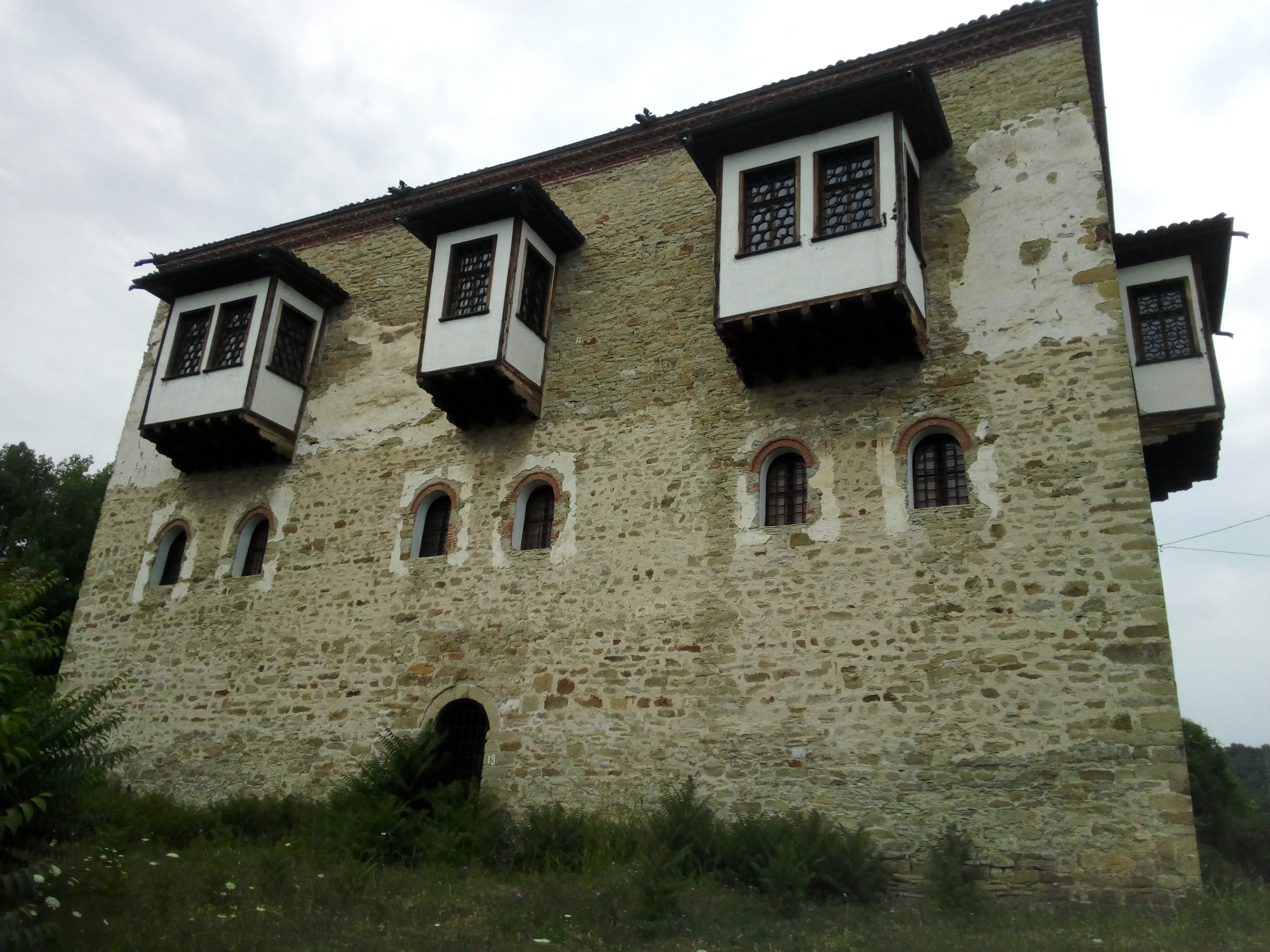

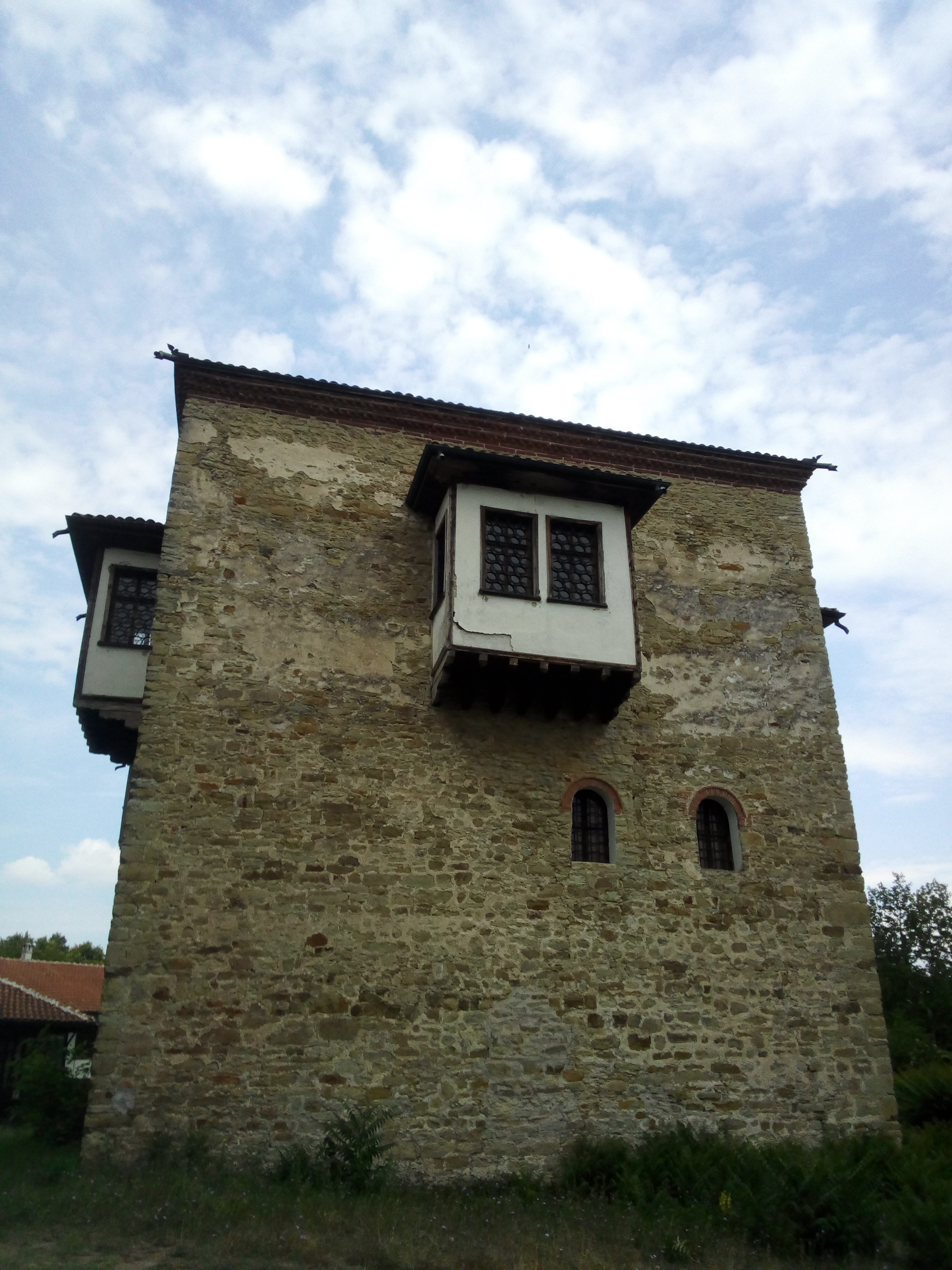

=== St. George's Church ===
Consecrated in 1835, it is among the oldest in the Veliko Tarnovo diocese. Later it was expanded and a balcony was added. Painted by Zahari Zograf, there is a self-portrait of him at the southern entrance of the church behind the door.

The painter probably did his work before he started painting the church in Transfiguration Monastery and the famous "Wheel of Life".

The village celebrates the day of the patron saint of the church "St. George" on May 6 ([St. George's Day]). A carnival is held in the center of the village that everyone can enjoy and have fun.

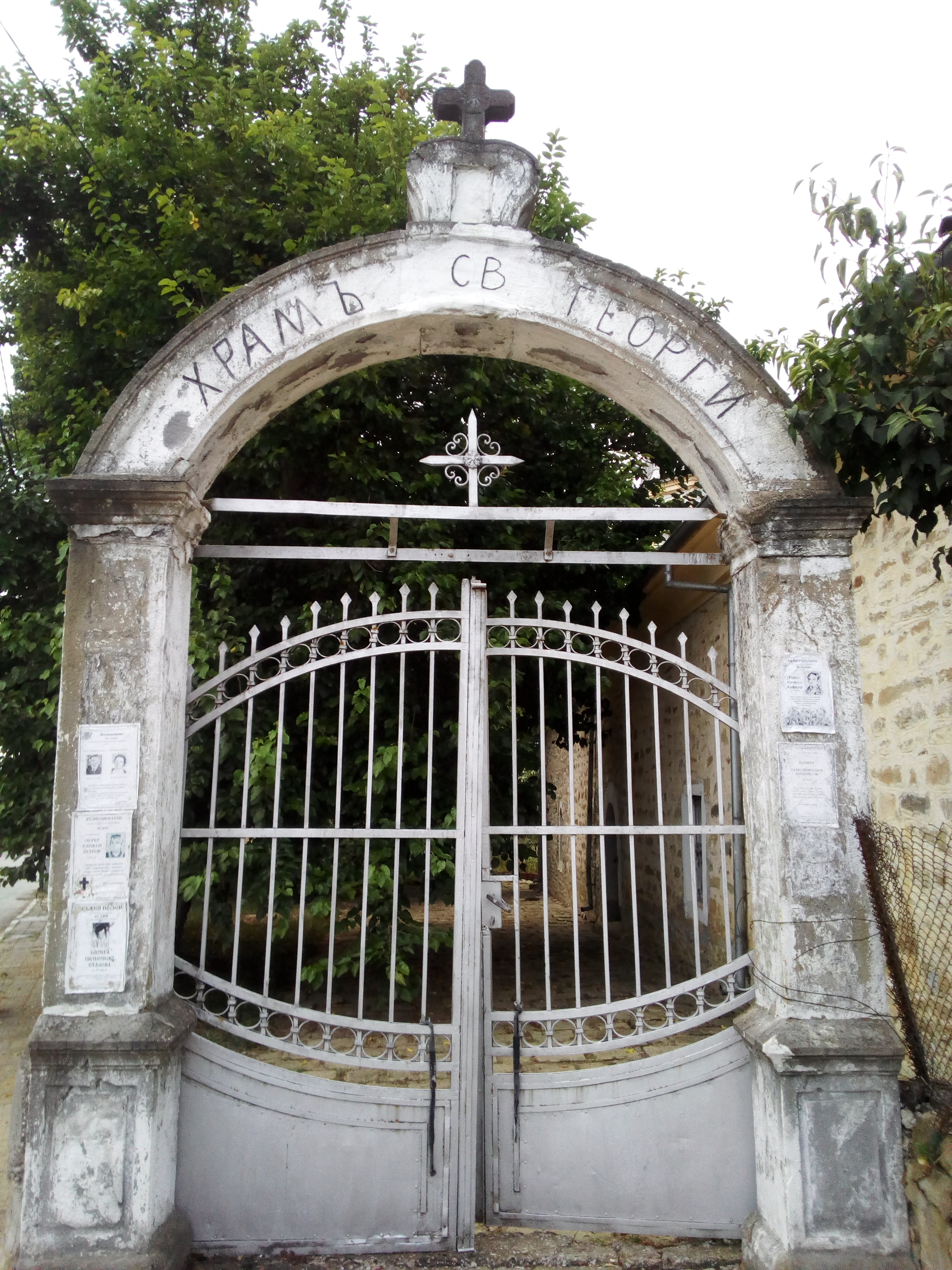

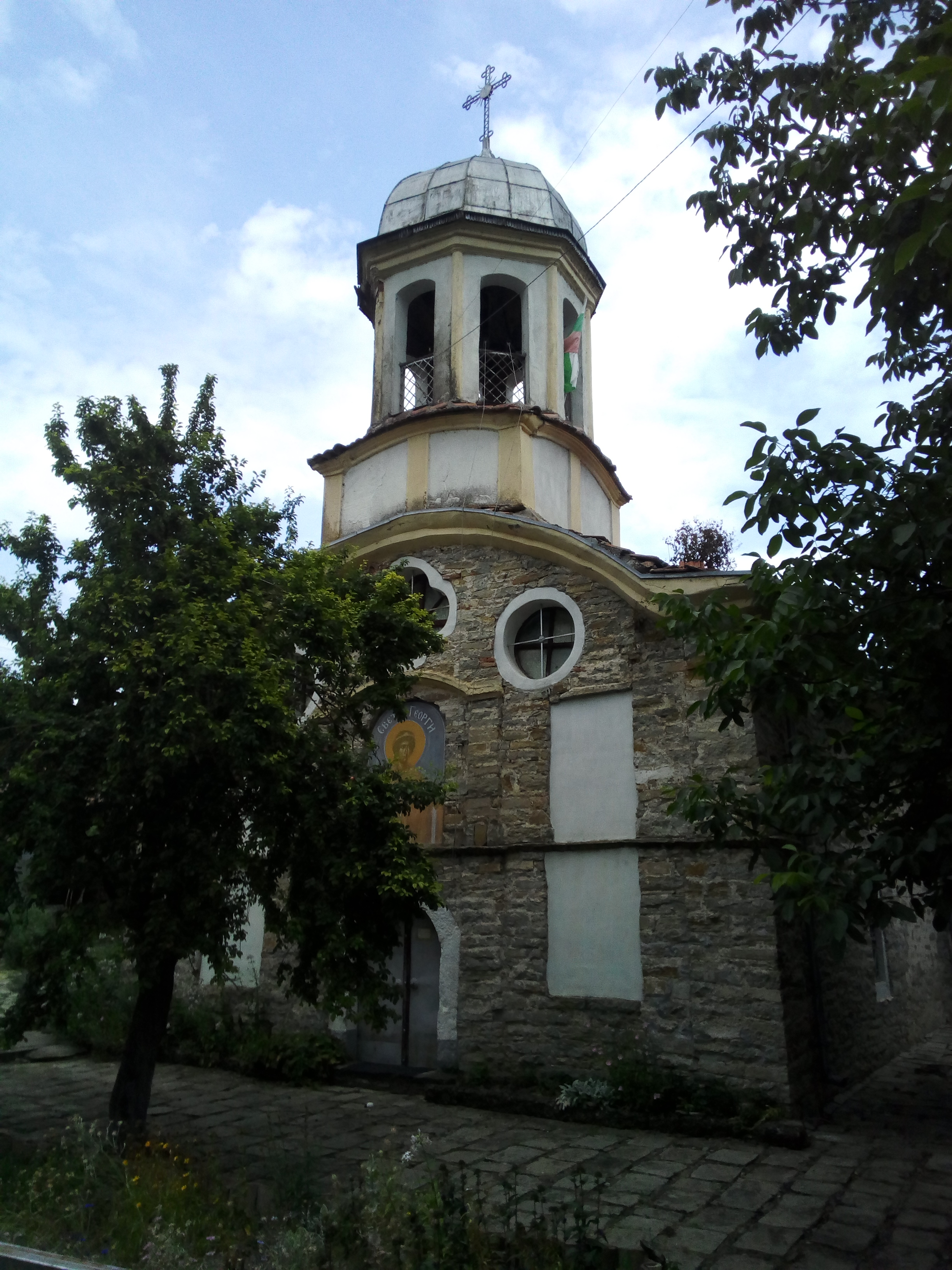

=== Chitalishte "Lesson - 1920" ===
Supports 2 art formations - a mixed folk chorus and the "Ledeniк grandmas" formation and carries out support activities in its information center. There is also an extensive library with a reading room.

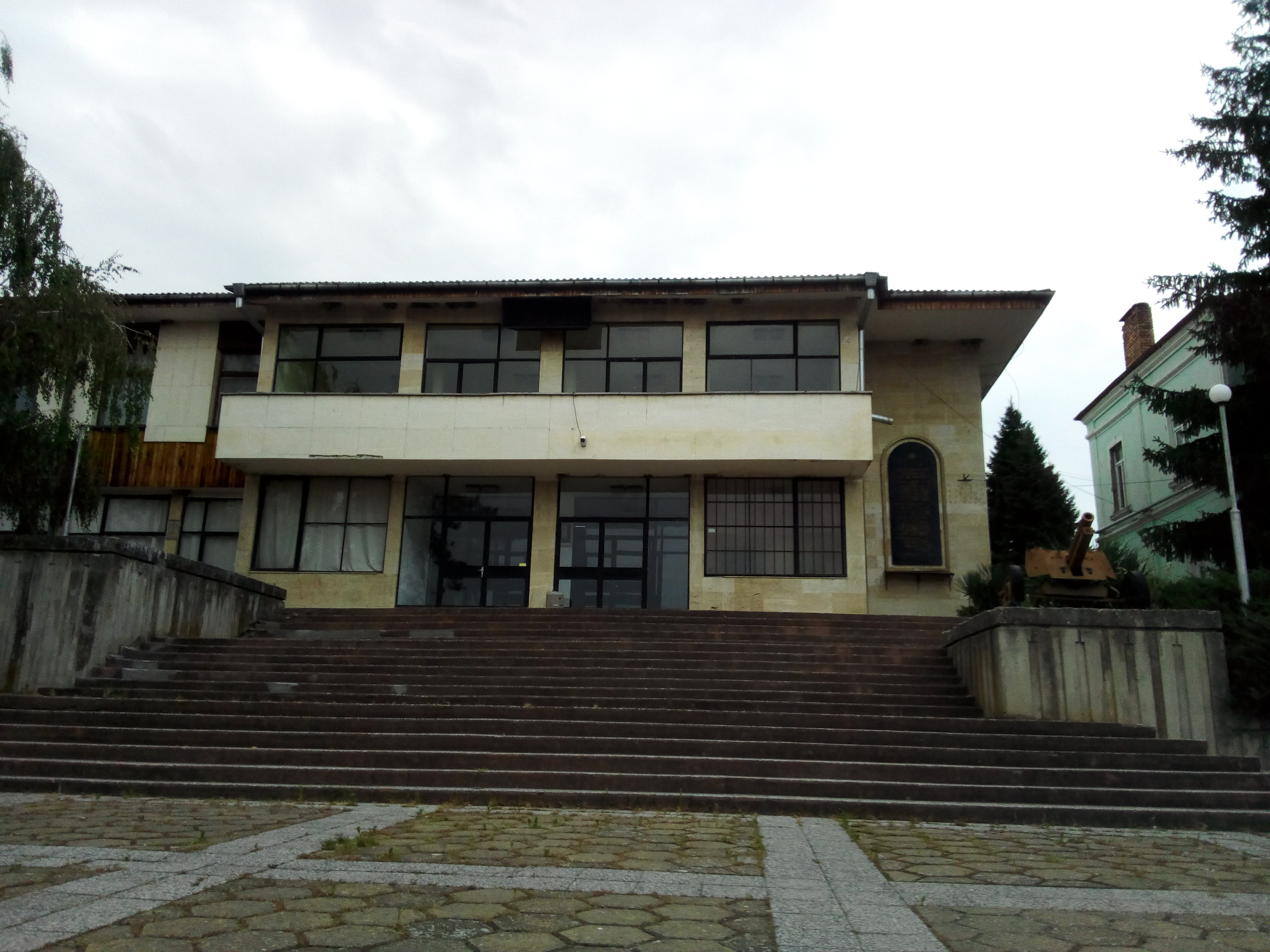

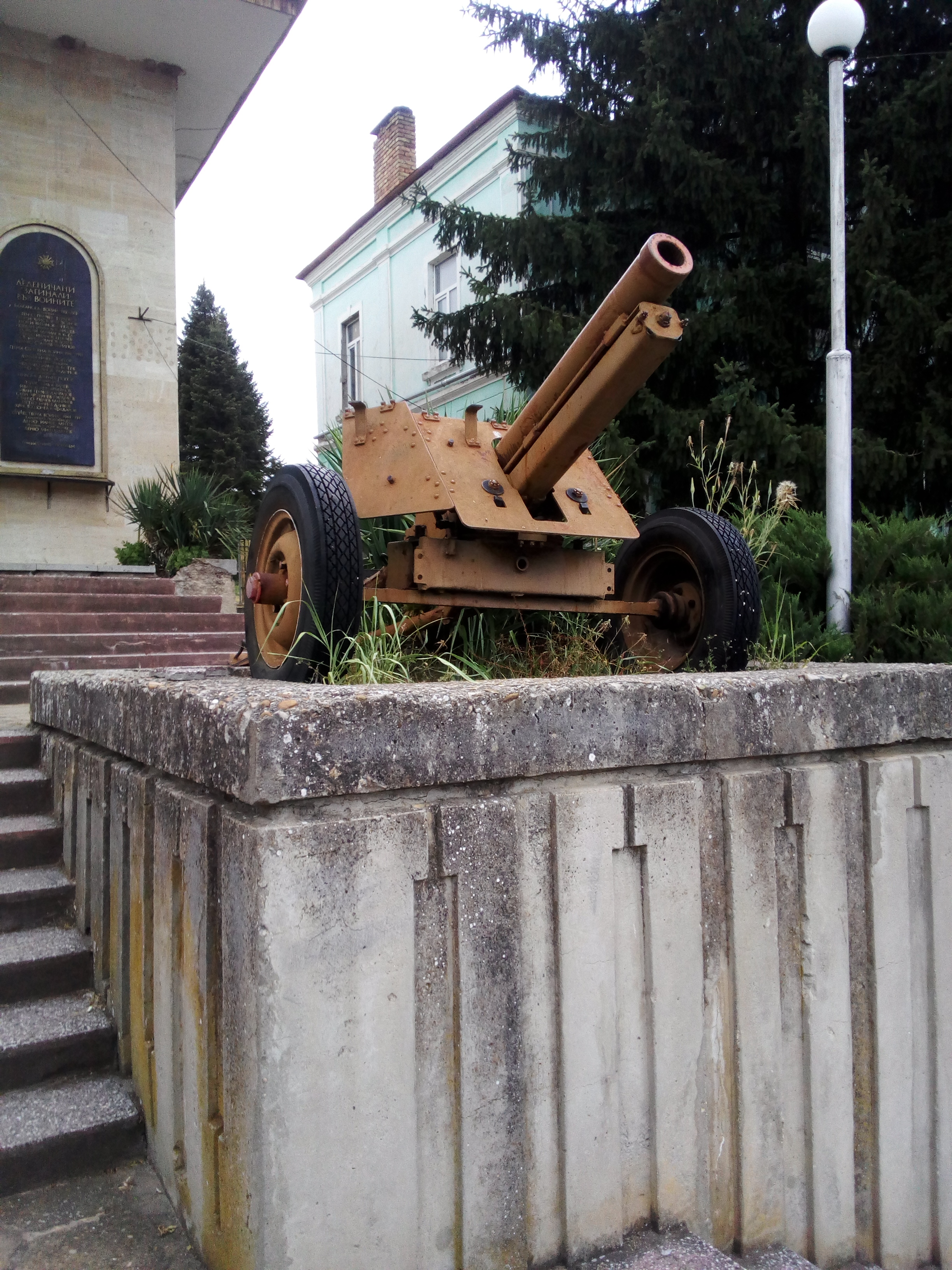

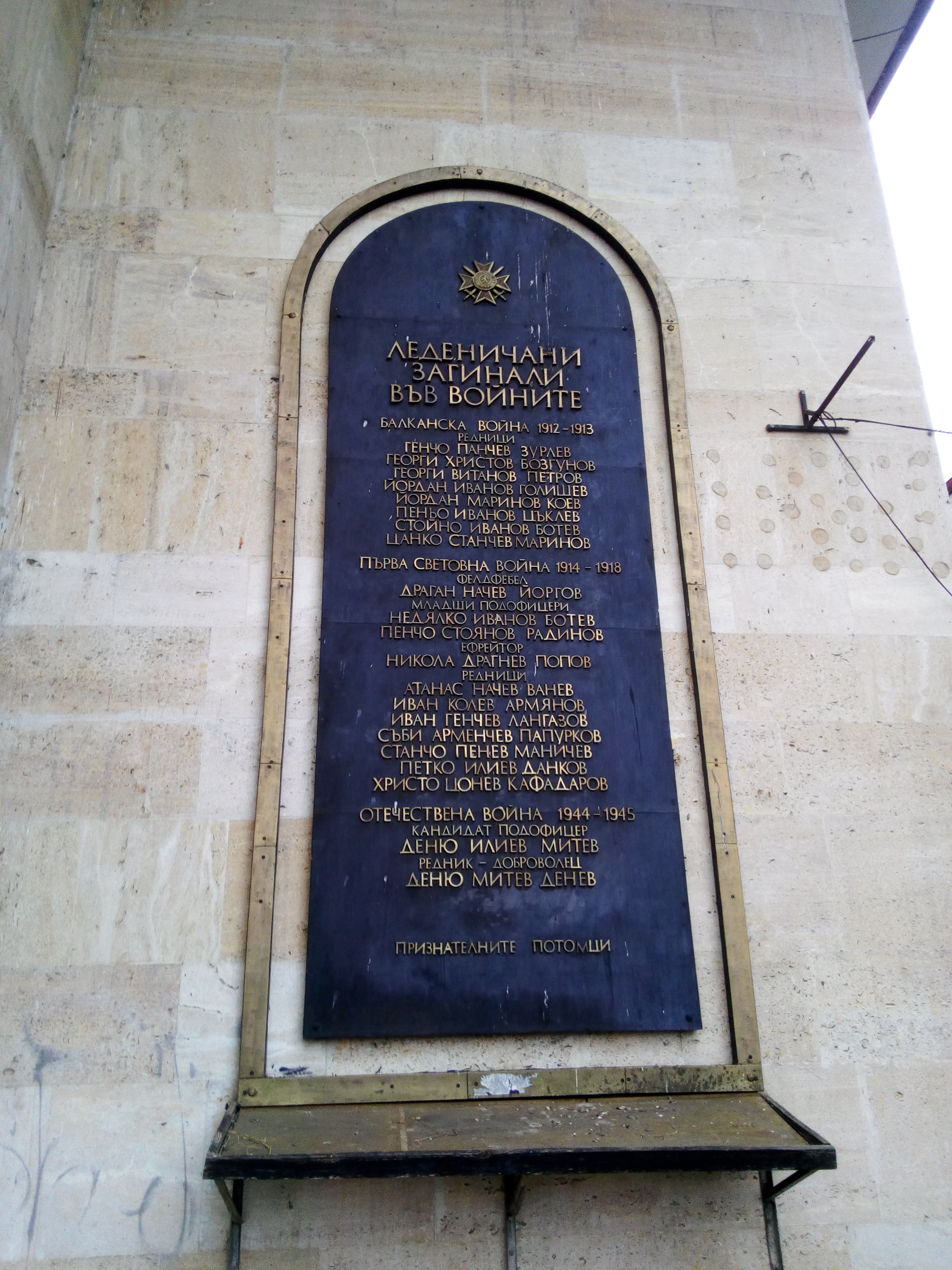

=== The "Big stones" ===
The "big stones" is a popular place on the Yantra river, where people go for swimming and sunbathing on the actual stones.

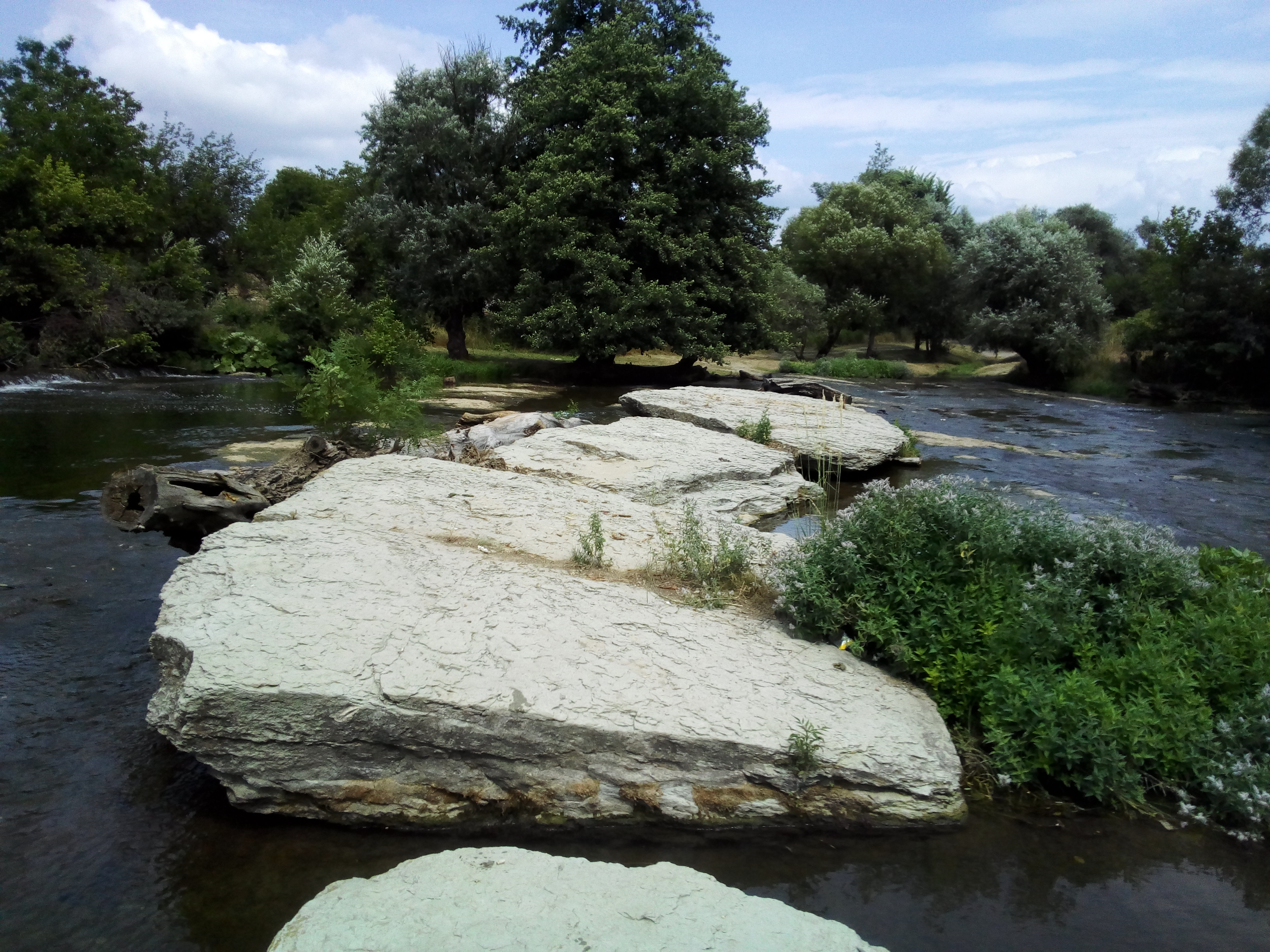

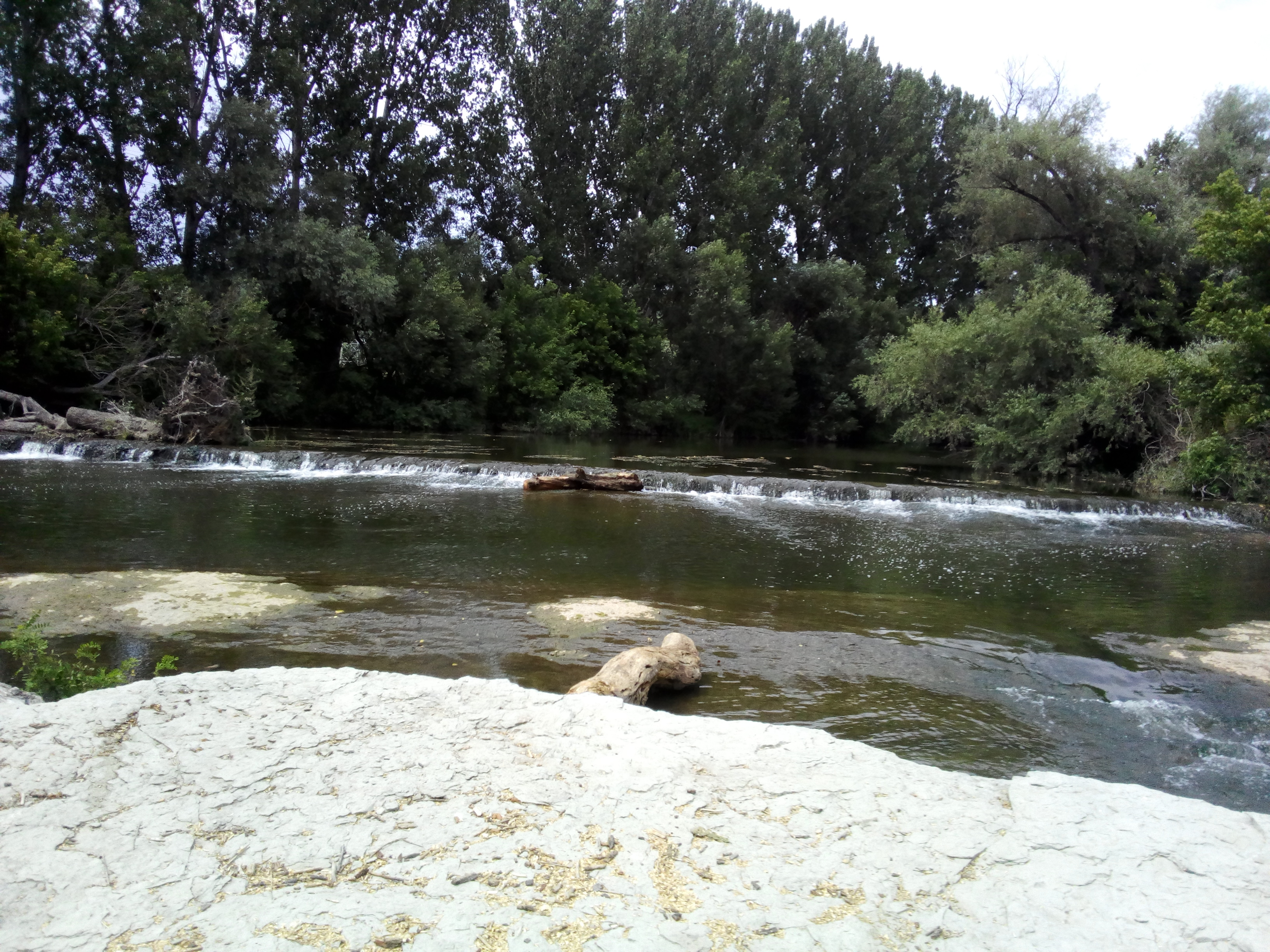

== People ==
- Ivan Devedzhiev (1893 - ), Colonel
- Marin Devedjiev (1922 - 2016), academician
- Nikola Ivanov, Bulgarian revolutionary from the IMRO, member of the Konstantin Nunkov Cheta

== Landmarks ==
The architectural atmosphere of the Renaissance era is preserved in the village - old houses on 1-2 floors, with stone foundations and veranda. They are located mainly in the older western part of the village. The most important landmarks are:

- An ancient 17th-century residential tower, known as the Shemshi Bay Tower, is located on the rocky Mela hill, cut like a peninsula into the Yantra River. During the modern partial restoration of the tower a hotel was built, and the tower itself has been made an ethnographic museum on 3 floors.
- The St. George Church, consecrated in 1835, is one of the oldest in the Veliko Tarnovo diocese.
- The Ledenik hydroelectric power plant was built in 1929. It has low power - less than 1 kW.
- A stadium where the FC Etar team often trains.
- A moto-track, licensed for international competitions, operated until the 1990s. There is a renovation project from 2019.

== See also ==
- Geological map of Bulgaria, map sheet К-35-028
- City Hall of the village of Ledenik – in Facebook
