= Shemshevo =

- Location of Shemshevo
- Coordinates: 43°02′37″N 25°37′15″E
- Country: Bulgaria
- Province (Oblast): Veliko Tarnovo

Government
  - Mayor: Kiril Angelski
- Elevation: 236 m (774 ft)

Population (2020)
  - Total: 579
- Time zone: UTC+2 (EET)
  - Summer (DST): UTC+3 (EEST)
- Postal Code: 5027
- Area code: 06124

Shemshevo (Bulgarian: Шемшево) is a village in northern Bulgaria, part of Veliko Tarnovo Municipality, Veliko Tarnovo Province. Shemshevo village is located on the left bank of the Yantra River about four kilometers west of the town of Veliko Tarnovo. Its land features diverse terrain with varying altitudes - from 130 m for the low lowlands to 210 meters in the southern part of the village. The population of the village is 579 people. The majority of the population is between 35 and 55 years old.

== History ==
The valley of the Yantra River near the village of Shemshevo was inhabited since ancient times. The archaeological materials show that a settlement has existed since the end of the twelfth and early thirteenth century during the Second Bulgarian Empire. Until 1861 the religious needs of the village are served by monks - ascetics from neighboring monasteries. The village's church "St. Dimitar" was built in 1861 with volunteer work and donations from the villagers.

== Landmarks ==
The Thracian fortress Little Myal is situated south of the village. The castle is located on the Little Myal height. It is built in the shape of a semi-ellipse with dimensions 40 x 150 meters. It is described in the works of K. Shkorpil, a Czech - Bulgarian archaeologist and museum activist and the discoverer of the first Bulgarian capital Pliska. The fortified wall protects the area from the east, west and north. The wall is built with larger stones without mortar - masonry typical of the old Iron Age.

The Blue Pool is a small waterfall located southeast of the village.

== Culture, customs and traditions ==
The community center "Progress" has a theater hall with 120 seats, library and information center. It is the home of choir "Bulgarian" established in 1984 under artistic director Rajko Dolapchiev.

Traditionally, the village celebrates the following holidays: Trifon's Day, National holiday of Palm Sunday, Grandmother's Day, Children's Day. St. Lazarus' Day ritual ("lazarouvane") celebrates the arrival of spring. It is held eight days before Easter. On this day children pick willow branches and decorate the doors.
